= List of DC Super Hero Girls characters =

DC Super Hero Girls or DC Superhero Girls (in various countries) is an American superhero action figure web series based on the characters of the DC Universe.

== Characters table ==
= Main cast (credited)
= Recurring cast (3+ episodes)

Character	DC Super Hero Girls (web series)	DC Super Hero Girls (TV series)
Diana Prince / Wonder Woman	Grey DeLisle-Griffin	Grey DeLisle-Griffin
Kara Danvers / Supergirl	Anais Fairweather	Nicole Sullivan
Barbara "Babs" Gordon / Batgirl	Mae Whitman	Tara Strong
Karen Beecher / Bumblebee	Teala Dunn	Kimberly Brooks
Tatsu Yamashiro / Katana	Stephanie Sheh	Rina Hoshino
Pamela Lillian Isley / Poison Ivy	Tara Strong	Cristina Milizia
Harleen Quinzel / Harley Quinn	Tara Strong	Tara Strong
Jessica Cruz / Green Lantern	Cristina Milizia	Myrna Velasco
Zatanna "Zee" Zatara / Zatanna	Erica Lindbeck	Kari Wahlgren

== Main characters ==
Main characters recurring across all DC Super Hero Girls web series and 2019 animated series.

Code names	Public identity	Portrayer	Species	Starring	Supporting	Guest
Batgirl	Barbara "Babs" Gordon	Mae Whitman; Ashlyn Selich; Tara Strong	Homo sapiens	1, 2, 3, 4, 5	—N/a	—N/a
Mae Whitman Batgirl (voiced by Mae Whitman, reprised from Batman: The Brave and the Bold, in the first four seasons, Ashlyn Selich in the fifth season in the 2015 series; Tara Strong in the 2019 series): A techno wizard, she was accepted to Super Hero High solely based on her intelligence. She more than makes up for possessing zero super-powers with her smarts, her well-honed detective skills, and her computer genius. Before being accepted as a student, she was the tech assistant working at the school. Honing her detective skills and using her curious, tech-focused brain, Batgirl (a.k.a. Barbara Gordon) is always looking for opportunities to try out her newest crime-fighting gadgets. Batgirl used to operate in Gotham City, where she craved for replacing Robin as Batman's partner, until her father James Gordon and herself had to move to Metropolis. Barbara started attending Metropolis High School, feeling very self-aware due to being the new transfer student, but she soon made friends who were also secretly superheroes. Barbara also got a job as a bartender at the "Burrito Bucket". Batgirl is the comedic relief out of all of her friends. She is known to be bubbly, cheerful, upbeat and downright optimistic. She is the one that wants everyone to get along and is often seen as the "cheerleader" in the group because of her contagious enthusiasm and zest for life. Barbara is a fangirl and her ambitious nature makes her destined to be Batman's future sidekick. She is also a creative problem solver and will use her creativity and her surprisingly analytical thinking to stop the bad guys and be the glue in her friendships. Faust described Barbara Gordon as "the Fangirl. Energetic. Optimistic. Encouraging. Fun". As a hero, Batgirl is a "Sleuth. Enthusiastic. Agile. Surprisingly analytical. Thinks outside the box". Tara Strong, the voice of Batgirl and Harley Quinn, previously voiced Batgirl for a majority of DC Animated Universe sequences, which included The New Batman Adventures, Batman Beyond: Return of the Joker, and Gotham Girls. She continued to voice Batgirl/Barbara Gordon in the Cartoon Network series Beware the Batman, Super Best Friends Forever, Teen Titans Go!, and voiced her in Batman: The Killing Joke.
Bumblebee	Karen Beecher	Teala Dunn; Kimberly Brooks	Homo sapiens	1, 2, 3, 4, 5	—N/a	—N/a
Teala Dunn Bumblebee (voiced by Teala Dunn in the 2015 series; Kimberly Brooks in the 2019 series): A social butterfly, she uses her abilities to spy on super-villains to ensure that her team is always prepared for any scheme. Her powers include shrinkability, sonic blasts, and enhanced strength. This tech genius is outgoing and energetic. The selfless superhero believes in the powerful effects of teamwork. She may lack the fighting skills of her super friends, but she has more heart and brainy resilience than anyone in Metropolis. She is always focusing her energy and engineering skills on upgrading her suit with the latest tech. Faust described Karen Beecher as "the Nobody. Shy. Awkward. Sympathetic. Full of heart". As a hero, Bumblebee is "the Rookie. Brilliant. Eager. Clumsy. Never gives up".
Green Lantern	Jessica Cruz	Cristina Milizia; Myrna Velasco	Homo sapiens	1, 2, 3, 4, 5	—N/a	—N/a
Green Lantern (voiced by Cristina Milizia in the 2015 series; Myrna Velasco in the 2019 series): Driven by compassion, Green Lantern (a.k.a. Jessica Cruz) uses her Power Ring to protect the innocent. A hero who refuses to throw a punch, she could end most confrontations easily, if not for the fact that she is a pacifist. Initially reluctant to become a Green Lantern, she actively refuses to hit anyone. She is also an environmentalist and a vegan. Faust described Jessica Cruz as "the Activist. Compassionate. Dedicated. Hard-working. Resolute". As a hero, Green Lantern is a "Protector. Pacifist. Righteous. Self-sacrificing. Strong-willed".
Harley Quinn	Harleen Quinzel	Tara Strong	Homo sapiens	1, 2, 3, 4, 5	—N/a	—N/a
Tara Strong Harley Quinn (voiced by Tara Strong in both series): The resident class clown, she dedicates herself to spectacular pranks and endless puns. This unpredictable jokester and quick-witted acrobat makes it her job to create fun.
Katana	Tatsu Yamashiro	Stephanie Sheh; Rina Hoshino	Homo sapiens	1, 2, 3, 4, 5	—N/a	—N/a
Stephanie Sheh Katana (voiced by Stephanie Sheh in the 2015 series; Rina Hoshino in the 2019 series): An artist with an edge, she loves to blend her love of art and fashion to create a killer look. Fearless Katana is a skilled martial artist and swordswoman. She considers her blade a part of her and often speaks to it. Katana is a very strict and serious individual, with an intense character defined by a silent fierceness that matches Diana Prince's own. She is a fastidious sort whom takes discipline to heart, feeling that an able mind is befitting of an apt body. She often takes the time to hone ones acumen as well as training the body. Tatsu is also extremely unforgiving towards the criminally corrupt, at one time believing it was a heroes duty to punish and avenge the crimes placated by the wicked, to the most extreme of degrees. This narrow mindset also made her a little naive, as Katana once mistook the Superhero Girls for villains after having dispatched most of criminals in Metropolis. This train of thought was further emboldened by the feeble means in which the reviled, decadent souls are handled by law enforcement.
Poison Ivy	Pamela Lillian Isley	Tara Strong; Cristina Milizia	Homo planta	1, 2, 3, 4, 5	—N/a	—N/a
Poison Ivy (voiced by Tara Strong in the 2015 series; Cristina Milizia in the 2019 series): A garden variety misfit, she gained her earth-based abilities from an experiment gone awry. This shy science genius can not only control plants but accelerate their growth as well. Idealistic, Poison Ivy is an ally of plant-kind. A brilliant botanical biochemist, Pamela Isley is a fervent eco-terrorist out to save the world's plant life by any means necessary. She often finds herself at odds with Green Lantern, though they have, on occasion, fought on the same side.
Supergirl	Kara Danvers	Anais Fairweather; Nicole Sullivan	Kryptonian	1, 2, 3, 4, 5	—N/a	—N/a
Nicole Sullivan Supergirl (voiced by Anais Fairweather in the 2015 series; Nicole Sullivan in the 2019 series until 2022): A kind and noble person, she is always ready to save the day and to help others. Her powers include heat vision, super-strength, ice breath, flight, x-ray vision, super-speed, and a sonic yell. People describe her as a clumsy and optimistic person. She is always ready to protect others, even when it means risking her own life in the process. Confident and competitive, Supergirl (a.k.a. Kara Danvers) always means well, but she does not always know her own superhuman strength, which all too often gets her into real trouble. Hot-headed, rebellious and brash, Kara works hard to step out of her cousin's shadow at the same time that she attends Metropolis High School as Kara Danvers. It was there where she met and befriended several more heroines. Faust described Kara Zor-El as "The Rebel. Confident. Funny. Hot Headed. Stands up for the little guy". As a hero, she is "The Muscle. Super Strong. Fearless. Aggressive. Tough".
Wonder Woman	Diana Prince	Grey Griffin	Amazonian demigoddess	1, 2, 3, 4, 5	—N/a	—N/a
Grey Griffin Wonder Woman (voiced by Grey Griffin in both series): A natural born leader, she comes from paradise island of Themyscira, a place full of warrior women. Wondy, as she is called, uses her modified Themysciran steel shield, bulletproof bracelets, and the Lasso of Truth to make the world a better and safer place. She is known to be courageous and competitive. A crusader for truth and justice, Wonder Woman (a.k.a. Diana Prince) is always looking to stop evil in its tracks with courage and supreme confidence, while excelling at Metropolis High in both academics and sports. Diana of Themyscira, Princess of Amazons, daughter of Queen Hippolyta, is a 317-year-old Amazonian demigoddess, but is no older in mortal years than a human teenager at the age of 17. Born on Paradise Island, she is a (valedictorian) student at Metropolis High School, where she feels awkwardly out of place. After a fight with a fellow student, Diana discovered there were more heroines attending her school. Diana and her five new friends founded a super-team that she became leader of. Faust described Princess Diana as a "Valedictorian. Intelligent. Honest. Adorable. Perfect. Student council president. An awkward fish-out-of-water". As a hero, Wonder Woman is described as "Crusader. Courageous. Disciplined. Skilled. Honorable. Compassionate. Leadership".
Zatanna	Zatanna "Zee" Zatara	Kari Wahlgren	Homo magi	1, 2, 3, 4, 5	—N/a	—N/a
Kari Wahlgren Zatanna (voiced by Erica Lindbeck in the 2015 series, Kari Wahlgren in the 2019 series): Hilariously overdramatic and lovingly snarky, Zatanna (a.k.a. Zee Zatara) is the most beautiful DC Super Hero Girl out of all her friends. A supernaturally talented performer, Zee adores the spotlight and tackles the social scene at Metropolis High with her trademark confidence. Zatanna Zatara is a student at Metropolis High School, a stage magician in training, and one of the most powerful magic-casters in the DC Universe. Faust described Zatanna as "Show off. Confident. Flamboyant. Aspirational. Hard working". As a hero, Zatanna is "Magic. Entertaining. Mysterious. Powerful. Spectacular".

== Recurring characters ==
=== Appearing in both series ===
Appearing in both series
Beast Boy (voiced by Greg Cipes in the 2015 series; Kari Wahlgren in the 2019 series): Beast Boy is an eccentric, just, and loyal friend and a shape-shifter that can transform into any animal he wants. He is silly, goofy and the life of any party but can be serious when he has to.; Catwoman (voiced by Cristina Pucelli in the 2015 series; Cree Summer in the 2019 series): An orphan from Gotham City, she is a feisty feline who learned that she can only count on herself. This independent girl is one of Cheetah's friends.; Green Lantern (voiced by Josh Keaton in the 2015 series; Jason Spisak in the 2019 series): Hal Jordan is charming, smart, and charismatic save-ball superstar, and is also a proud member of the Green Lantern Corps. He was thrown by Wonder Woman when she mistook his handshake for a sparring invitation.; Flash (voiced by Josh Keaton in the 2015 series; Phil LaMarr in the 2019 series): A teenager with the superhuman ability of superhuman speed, he is fast enough to keep up with Supergirl.; Star Sapphire (voiced by Jessica DiCicco in the 2015 series; Kari Wahlgren in the 2019 series): She is the misunderstood, always attractive (if she says so herself) resident diva. She can often be self-righeteous and overly dramatic, but is a fierce justice-fighter when duty calls all the same.; Raven (voiced by Tara Strong): A demon-human hybrid who possesses extraordinarily powerful psionic and magical abilities, all inherited from her inter-dimensional demon father, Trigon. She has more of a Gothic personality, but is always there to help her allies and friends in danger. She has made her first appearance in "Nevermore, Part 1" in season 4 and also makes an appearance in season 5 episode "Spell-Shocked".; Starfire (voiced by Hynden Walch in the 2015 series; Grey Griffin in the 2019 series): An optimistic, benevolent, feisty and clever warrior princess from the planet Tamaran, but is a down-to-earth girl. Her natural Tamaranean abilities include FTL flight, superhuman strength and bright green-colored circular bolts of pure ultraviolet energy called starbolts that she generates from her hands and eyes. With her exotic alien beauty, she is truly a supermodel. She usually teams up with her friend Cyborg. In the Intergalactic Games film, she fights against and eventually, alongside her cynical elder sister Blackfire.; Cyborg (voiced by Khary Payton in the 2015 series; Phil LaMarr in the 2019 series): A cyborg who possesses extensive knowledge in technology and can use his sonic cannon to blast enemies. His robot armor gives him superhuman strength, resistance to intense heat and cold, superhuman durability and semi-invulnerability. He usually teams up with his good friend Starfire.; Commissioner Gordon (voiced by Tom Kenny in the 2015 series; Fred Tatasciore in the 2019 series): A teacher and the father of Batgirl.; Queen Hippolyta (voiced by Julianne Grossman in the 2015 series; Cree Summer in the 2019 series): The mother of Wonder Woman and queen of the Amazonian island of Themyscira.; Enchantress (voiced by April Stewart in the 2015 series; Ashley Spillers as June Moone and Kari Walhgren as Enchantress in the 2019 series): June Moone is the art teacher who has a tendency to shift into her Enchantress form.; Cheetah (voiced by Ashley Eckstein in the 2015 series; Tara Strong in the 2019 series): Ruling Super Hero High with an iron paw, her charisma draws others to her, but she isn't afraid to cheat to get what she desires. Can be very annoying, mean, and she hates Wonder Woman, who seems to always "steal her show". Cheetah also hates following the rules, so Hawkgirl is kind of her rival.; Giganta (voiced by Grey Griffin): A giant villainess who frequently causes chaos in the city.; Lena Luthor (voiced by Romi Dames in the 2015 series; Cassandra Lee Morris in the 2019 series): A mad scientist who disguises herself as Super Hero High School's resident IT girl, and a creator of the sneaky green kryptomites, which eventually resulted in her being bald and more closely resembling her brother Lex.; The Riddler (voiced by Yuri Lowenthal in the 2015 series; David Hornsby in the 2019 series): While he is usually nice, he commits petty crimes. He has a crush on Batgirl.; Steve Trevor (voiced by Josh Keaton in the 2015 series; Yuri Lowenthal in the 2019 series) —; Sinestro (voiced by Tom Kenny in the 2015 series; Keith Ferguson in the 2019 series) —; Solomon Grundy (voiced by Fred Tatasciore) —

=== Exclusive to the 2019 television series ===
Exclusive to the 2019 television series
Dee Bradley Baker — Ace, Krypto; Steve Blum — Fuseli; D. C. Douglas — Slade Wilson / Deathstroke; Keith Ferguson — Shane O'Shaughnessy, Jeremiah Danvers, Francis Zeul, Bruce Wayne / Batman, Dick Grayson / Robin, Alfred Pennyworth; Will Friedle — Lex Luthor; Chelsea Kane — Rose Wilson; Phil LaMarr — Mr. Zatara, Carter Hall / Hawkman; John de Lancie — Victor Fries / Mr. Freeze; Stephanie Lemelin – Shiera Sanders; Lara Jill Miller — Casey Krinsky; Max Mittelman — Clark Kent / Superman; Jessica McKenna — Garth Bernstein / Aqualad, Paulette; Jason C. Miller – Ra's al Ghul (singing); Liam O'Brien — General Zod; Eddie Perino — Oliver Queen / Green Arrow; Alexander Polinsky — Oswald Cobblepot / Penguin; Griffin Puatu — Mortimer Drake / Cavalier; Kevin Michael Richardson — Dex-Starr; Sendhil Ramamurthy – Ra's al Ghul; Jason Spisak — Kilowog, Shaggy Man, Ace of Spades; Fred Tatasciore — Mr. Chapin, Ethel, Lucy; Tara Strong – Ursa; Grey Griffin – Lois Lane; Mallory Low – Leslie Willis / Livewire; Kimberly Brooks — Eliza Danvers; Nicole Sullivan — Power Girl, Beatrice Zeul; Jeremiah Watkins — Joker

=== Exclusive to the 2015 web series ===
Exclusive to the 2015 web series
Big Barda (voiced by Misty Lee): Formerly a member of the Female Furies, who reformed while in prison and is willing to lend her enhanced strength to her superheroine friends.; Hawkgirl (voiced by Nika Futterman): She, as hall monitor, ensures that students always follow the rules. She plans her day to the minute. Not only does she keep order among her classmates, but her superb detective skills are useful all throughout the city. She has trouble with making Cheetah follow the speed limit in the Halls.; Amanda Waller (voiced by Yvette Nicole Brown): The principal of Super Hero High School.; Gorilla Grodd (voiced by John DiMaggio): The vice-principal of Super Hero High School and a reformed supervillain.; Crazy Quilt (voiced by Tom Kenny): A teacher who teaches Intro to Super Suits.; Etrigan the Demon: The poetry teacher.; Lucius Fox (voiced by Phil LaMarr): A teacher who teaches Weaponomics.; Red Tornado (voiced by Maurice LaMarche): A teacher who teaches Flyer's Education.; Wildcat (voiced by John DiMaggio): The gym teacher.; Liberty Belle: A teacher.; Parasite (voiced by Tom Kenny): The janitor at Super Hero High School who cleans up the messes caused by the students.; Granny Goodness (voiced by April Stewart): A resident of Apokolips who pretends to be the Super Hero High School's kindly librarian, but tries to take over the school with her villain army. Her plan failed and she was arrested.; Female Furies: A team of villainous teenagers from Apokolips.; Artemiz (voiced by Teala Dunn): A member of the Female Furies who is an expert at archery.; Lashina (voiced by Jessica DiCicco): A whip-wielding member of the Female Furies.; Mad Harriet (voiced by Misty Lee): A vicious member of the Female Furies who wields metal claws.; Speed Queen (voiced by Mae Whitman for seasons 2—4, Ashlyn Selich in season 5): A super-fast member of the Female Furies.; Stompa (voiced by April Stewart): A super-strong member of the Female Furies.; Dark Opal (voiced by Sean Schemmel): An evil warlord and commander of his shadow army that tries to take over the school.; Eclipso (voiced by Mona Marshall): A sorceress and a partner of Dark Opal, she collects priceless gems to increase her power. Her main targets are SHH's Amethyst and Supergirl's crystal that possesses extraordinary power.; Double Dare Twins (both voiced by Lauren Tom): Twin thieves.; Darkseid (voiced by John DiMaggio): The leader of Apokolips, who went undercover as a math teacher known as "Dr. Seid".

== Guest characters ==
=== Appearing in both series ===
Appearing in both series
Krypto — Supergirl's dog.; Ace — Batgirl's dog.

=== Exclusive to the 2019 television series ===
Exclusive to the 2019 television series

=== Exclusive to the 2015 web series ===
Exclusive to the 2015 web series
Blackfire (voiced by Hynden Walch): Originally a well-known villain and intergalactic criminal, Blackfire is the firstborn child and eldest daughter of the former Emperor and Empress of Tamaran. She is the homicidal older sister of Starfire whom she despises. Unlike the rest of her Tamaranean kind, her hair is colored dark purplish-black as opposed to auburn. Her natural Tamaranean abilities consist of flying faster than light (an ability she lacks in the original comic books), superhuman strength, superhuman agility and reflexes, enhanced endurance, and emitting strong light purple-colored circular bolts of ultraviolet energy from her hands and eyes called "blackbolts". She debuts in the Intergalactic Games film as one of the opposing teams of villainy, but later switches to the superhero team alongside her younger sister. She made an appearance in the Season 3 episode, "Day of Funship" and she cameos in the two-part "Tamaranean Dance Club".; Vixen/Mari McCabe (voiced by Kimberly Brooks): A volunteer at the zoo, she first appears once in the third season's episode "Wildside Part 2".; Frost (voiced by Danica McKellar): She is a good friend of Poison Ivy and is a scientist.; Miss Martian (voiced by Cristina Pucelli): She is usually a shy person but can still help with her martian abilities.; Platinum (voiced by Grey Griffin): Originally a villain who was on the opposing team during the Intergalactic Games, she ultimately sacrificed herself to destroy Brainiac, but later reformed herself as the championship was being rewarded to the heroes of Super Hero High. She was welcomed to sit between Batgirl and Supergirl.; Damian Wayne/Robin (voiced by Grey Griffin): Bruce Wayne and Talia al Ghul's son and Ra's al Ghul's grandson, trained by the League of Assassins, whom Batgirl babysitted in the Season 5 episode, "Kid Napped".; Mera (voiced by Erica Lindbeck): Before she joined Super Hero High, she was a partner with Siren as they wanted to steal the Book of Legends from Super Hero High until her sister turned on her, but later on she redeemed herself when Bumblebee saved her and teamed up with her and Wonder Woman to stop Siren from taking over Atlantis.; Trigon (voiced by Kevin Michael Richardson): A supremely powerful inter-dimensional demon from another world of darkness, who possesses great powers, he is the father of super heroine Raven. At one point, he fought and was beaten by Starfire and Cyborg's teamwork.; Jumpa — Wonder Woman's kangaroo.; Honey — Bumblebee's bear cub.; Kitsune — Katana's fox.; Calliope — Harley Quinn's monkey.; Whatzit — Flash's turtle.; Storm — Mera's giant seahorse.
