= DC Super Hero Girls: Super Hero High =

- Genre: Superhero fiction Adventure; Comedy
- Based on: Characters from DC Comics
- Written by: Shea Fontana
- Directed by: Jennifer Coyle
- Starring: Teala Dunn; Ashley Eckstein; Anais Fairweather; Nika Futterman
- Theme music composer: Shaun Drew
- Opening theme: "Get Your Cape On" performed by Jordyn Kane
- Country of origin: United States
- Original language: English

Production
- Executive producer: Sam Register
- Producers: Jennifer Coyle; Paula Haifley
- Editor: Molly Yahr
- Running time: 44 minutes
- Production companies: DC Entertainment; Warner Bros. Animation

Original release
- Network: Boomerang
- Release: March 19, 2016

DC Super Hero Girls: Super Hero High (also known as Super Hero High in United States) is a 2016 American animated superhero television film based on the DC Super Hero Girls web series. Albeit explaining the origins of Supergirl/Kara Zor-El and Batgirl/Barbara Gordon and taking place after the first season, it was created to promote the new DC Super Hero Girls series. The film aired on Boomerang on March 19, 2016 in the United States as well as on Boomerang UK on May 21, in the United Kingdom and Ireland. Also, Cartoon Network aired this show again on April 30 and June 5 the same year in the US and has subsequently made it available on its website.

== Synopsis ==
School is in session for DC Super Hero Girls where students master their super powers to become the Super Heroes of tomorrow. When Supergirl crash lands into the cafeteria, it is evident that though she has incredible power, she has a long way to go before she becomes a Super Hero. As Supergirl learns to harness her powers, the Junior Detective Club investigates a mysterious rash of security breaches.

The events in this TV special are also depicted in the Supergirl at Super Hero High novel by Lisa Yee.

== Cast ==
- Anais Fairweather as Supergirl
- Grey Griffin as Wonder Woman, Giganta, Korugarian
- Tara Strong as Poison Ivy, Harley Quinn, Raven
- Mae Whitman as Batgirl, Speed Queen
- Teala Dunn as Bumblebee, Artemiz
- Stephanie Sheh as Katana
- Ashley Eckstein as Cheetah
- Nika Futterman as Hawkgirl
- Josh Keaton as Hal Jordan, Barry Allen / Flash
- Tania Gunadi as Lady Shiva
- Fred Tatasciore as Killer Croc, Perry the Parademon
- April Stewart as Granny Goodness, Stompa
- Misty Lee as Big Barda, Mad Harriet
- Dean Cain as Jonathan Kent
- Helen Slater as Martha Kent
- Tom Kenny as Commissioner Gordon
- Hynden Walch as Starfire
