= Lego DC Super Hero Girls: Brain Drain =

- DVD cover
- Directed by: Todd Grimes
- Written by: Jeremy Adams
- Produced by: Rick Morales; Sam Register; Jill Wilfert; Robert Fewkes
- Starring: Romi Dames; Anais Fairweather; Grey Griffin; Ashlyn Selich
- Music by: Michael A. Levine
- Production companies: DC Entertainment; Warner Bros. Animation; Mattel; The Lego Group
- Distributed by: Warner Bros. Home Entertainment
- Release dates: July 25, 2017 (digital); August 8, 2017 (DVD)
- Running time: 75 minutes
- Country: United States
- Language: English

Lego DC Super Hero Girls: Brain Drain is a 2017 American animated superhero comedy film based on the DC Super Hero Girls web series, produced by Warner Bros. Animation. It is the third film in the DC Super Hero Girls films, as well as the first in the series to be based on the DC Super Hero Girls brand of Lego. It was digitally released on July 25, 2017, and was followed by a DVD release on August 8. The film premiered on Cartoon Network in the US on November 19 the same year.

== Plot ==
The entire planet is in peril as Wonder Woman, Supergirl and Batgirl have to battle an unknown villain as well as short-term amnesia. The trio thought they all had the same bizarre dream where they witnessed Katana and Bumblebee stealing diamonds. They gave chase, but then they all woke up. It turns out that the events weren't just happening in their heads, and the three girls slowly began to realize that they had lost some time - an entire day. Others remember their missing 24 hours. The girls all acted extremely out of character, doing things like uploading an embarrassing video of Harley Quinn without her permission and replacing the school's Amethyst with Principal Waller's car. Their activities get them expelled. That makes them realize not everything is as it seems and leads them on a chase towards the hidden mastermind behind the plot, Eclipso.

== Cast ==
- Yvette Nicole Brown as Amanda Waller
- Greg Cipes as Beast Boy
- Romi Dames as Lena Luthor
- John DiMaggio as Gorilla Grodd, Wildcat
- Teala Dunn as Bumblebee
- Anais Fairweather as Supergirl
- Grey Griffin as Wonder Woman, Lois Lane
- Jennifer Hale as Mad Harriet
- Josh Keaton as Flash
- Tom Kenny as Jim Gordon
- Rachael MacFarlane as Artemiz
- Mona Marshall as Eclipso
- Meredith Salenger as Lashina
- Ashlyn Selich as Batgirl
- Stephanie Sheh as Katana
- Tara Strong as Harley Quinn

== Reception ==
Renee Longstreet for Common Sense Media gave the film a two out of five star rating and commented: "Still, while Lego DC Super Hero Girls: Brain Drain has music, jokes, suspense, and ongoing likable characters, it's a ho-hum production, lacking originality and specialness. And even little kids might be annoyed by some of the shrill and overly cutesy voice performances; grownups will simply cringe. Then there's the matter of Lego joining the DC family once again. Other than enhancing their toy and merchandise catalogues, what possible reason could there be to turn the animated teen Super Hero Girls into Legos?"

== See also ==
- DC Super Hero Girls
- Lego DC Super Hero Girls
- Lego DC Super Hero Girls: Super-Villain High
