= DC Super Hero Girls: Hero of the Year =

- DVD cover
- Directed by: Cecilia Aranovich
- Written by: Shea Fontana
- Produced by: Jennifer Coyle; Paula Haifley
- Starring: Teala Dunn; Anais Fairweather; Grey Griffin; Tara Strong; Stephanie Sheh; Mae Whitman
- Edited by: Molly Yahr
- Music by: Shaun Drew
- Production companies: DC Entertainment; Warner Bros. Animation; Mattel Playground Productions
- Distributed by: Warner Home Video
- Release dates: 24 July 2016 (San Diego Comic-Con); 9 August 2016 (digital); 23 August 2016 (DVD)
- Running time: 76 minutes
- Country: United States
- Language: English

DC Super Hero Girls: Hero of the Year is an American animated superhero film based on the DC Super Hero Girls web series, produced by Warner Bros. Animation. The film premiered at San Diego Comic-Con on July 24, 2016, and was released on Digital HD on August 9 and on DVD on August 23. It is the first film in the DC Super Hero Girls films.

== Synopsis ==
It is time for the annual Hero of the Year ceremony and the students of Super Hero High compete for the top prize, but the festivities take a turn when Dark Opal targets the heroes and steals some of their most valued possessions to form the ultimate weapon. Wonder Woman, Supergirl, Batgirl and Bumblebee must stop Eclipso and her partner Dark Opal to save the day.

Meanwhile, after Big Barda moves into Super Hero High, Lady Shiva had some trust issues with her after their latest encounter. Hawkgirl is having difficulties trying to work together with Beast Boy.

== Cast ==
- Yvette Nicole Brown as Amanda Waller
- Dean Cain as Jonathan Kent
- Greg Cipes as Beast Boy
- Jessica DiCicco as Star Sapphire
- John DiMaggio as Gorilla Grodd
- Teala Dunn as Bumblebee
- Ashley Eckstein as Cheetah
- Anais Fairweather as Supergirl
- Nika Futterman as Hawkgirl
- Grey Griffin as Wonder Woman, Giganta
- Julianne Grossman as Hippolyta
- Tania Gunadi as Lady Shiva
- Josh Keaton as Hal Jordan, Flash, Steve Trevor
- Tom Kenny as Crazy Quilt, Commissioner Gordon, Parasite
- Misty Lee as Big Barda
- Mona Marshall as Eclipso
- Danica McKellar as Frost
- Khary Payton as Cyborg
- Cristina Pucelli as Miss Martian, Amethyst
- Sean Schemmel as Dark Opal
- Stephanie Sheh as Katana
- Helen Slater as Martha Kent
- April Stewart as Alura
- Tara Strong as Harley Quinn, Poison Ivy
- Anna Vocino as Oracle
- Hynden Walch as Starfire
- B. J. Ward as Master Alchemist
- Mae Whitman as Batgirl
- Alexis Zall as Lois Lane
