= DC Super Hero Girls: Intergalactic Games =

- DVD cover
- Directed by: Cecilia Aranovich
- Written by: Shea Fontana
- Produced by: Jennifer Coyle; Paula Haifley
- Starring: Teala Dunn; Anais Fairweather; Grey Griffin; Tara Strong; Stephanie Sheh; Mae Whitman
- Edited by: Molly Yahr
- Music by: Shaun Drew
- Production companies: DC Entertainment; Warner Bros. Animation; Mattel Creations
- Distributed by: Warner Home Video
- Release dates: 9 May 2017 (digital); 23 May 2017 (DVD)
- Running time: 77 minutes
- Country: United States
- Language: English

DC Super Hero Girls: Intergalactic Games is an American animated direct-to-video superhero film based on the DC Super Hero Girls web series, produced by Warner Bros. Animation. It is the second film in the DC Super Hero Girls films. It was digitally released on 9 May 2017 and was followed by a DVD release on 23 May. Superheroines Wonder Woman, Supergirl, Batgirl, Poison Ivy, Harley Quinn, Bumblebee, and Katana all square off against Korugar Academy in the Intergalactic Games, but the trouble is in the air as Lena Luthor takes advantage of the gathering of the Supers to enact her villainous plan.

== Plot ==
Supergirl, Bumblebee and Batgirl are all excited for the Intergalactic Games and win the championship for Super Hero High, but they are interrupted by a call for help in the city. They investigate to find humans being attacked by three robots: two male and one female called Platinum. With the arrival of Starfire, the robotic trio give Batgirl an idea to magnetize them. At Super Hero High School, it is revealed that Platinum and her cronies were part of an experiment to give machines more human emotion and free will, to make them superheroes as well.

Meanwhile, when the students from Korugar academy arrive, Starfire tries to connect with her sister Blackfire. When the students from Apokolips arrive, Lashina, the new member of the Female Furries, tries to manipulate Big Barda into coming back to their team.

== Cast ==
- Yvette Nicole Brown as Principal Waller
- Greg Cipes as Beast Boy, Iron
- Romi Dames as Lena Luthor
- Jessica DiCicco as Star Sapphire, Lashina
- John DiMaggio as Ambassador Bek
- Teala Dunn as Bumblebee, Artemiz
- Anais Fairweather as Supergirl
- Nika Futterman as Hawkgirl
- Grey Griffin as Wonder Woman, Platinum
- Julianne Grossman as Hippolyta, Mongal
- Tania Gunadi as Lady Shiva
- Josh Keaton as Flash, Steve Trevor
- Tom Kenny as Sinestro, Lobo
- Phil LaMarr as Will Magnus
- Misty Lee as Big Barda, Mad Harriet
- Danica McKellar as Frost
- Khary Payton as Cyborg, Lead
- Stephanie Sheh as Katana, Bleez
- April Stewart as Granny Goodness, Stompa
- Tara Strong as Harley Quinn, Poison Ivy
- Fred Tatasciore as Brainiac, Kryptomites
- Anna Vocino as Oracle
- Hynden Walch as Starfire, Blackfire
- Mae Whitman as Barbara Gordon, Batgirl, Speed Queen
- Alexis Zall as Lois Lane
