= Lego DC Super Hero Girls: Super-Villain High =

- DVD cover
- Directed by: Elsa Garagarza
- Written by: Jeremy Adams
- Produced by: Rick Morales; Sam Register; Jill Wilfert; Robert Fewkes
- Starring: Romi Dames; Anais Fairweather; Grey Griffin; Ashlyn Selich
- Edited by: Rob Ehenrich
- Music by: Robert J. Kral
- Production companies: DC Entertainment; Warner Bros. Animation; The Lego Group
- Distributed by: Warner Bros. Home Entertainment
- Release dates: May 1, 2018 (digital); May 15, 2018 (DVD)
- Running time: 78 minutes
- Country: United States
- Language: English

Lego DC Super Hero Girls: Super-Villain High is a 2018 American animated superhero comedy film based on the DC Super Hero Girls web series, produced by Warner Bros. Animation. It is the fourth film in the DC Super Hero Girls films, as well as the second and final Lego branded film in the series to be based on DC Super Hero Girls, before the series itself got rebooted by Lauren Faust in 2019. It was digitally released on May 1, 2018, and was followed by a DVD release on May 15.

== Premise ==
Batgirl, Supergirl, Wonder Woman and Bumblebee go on an adventure to uncover the truth about Uber High, a school for supervillains.

== Cast ==
- Yvette Nicole Brown as Principal Amanda Waller
- Greg Cipes as Beast Boy
- Romi Dames as Lena Luthor, Divide
- John DiMaggio as Gorilla Grodd, Wildcat
- Teala Dunn as Bumblebee
- Ashley Eckstein as Cheetah
- Anais Fairweather as Supergirl
- Nika Futterman as Hawkgirl
- Grey Griffin as Wonder Woman, Lois Lane
- Josh Keaton as Flash
- Maurice LaMarche as Oberon, Red Tornado
- Danica McKellar as Frost
- Cristina Milizia as Jessica Cruz, Green Lantern
- Khary Payton as Cyborg, Wizard Shazam
- Cristina Pucelli as Catwoman
- Kevin Michael Richardson as Doctor Fate, Delivery Man
- Meredith Salenger as Backlash, Lashina
- Ashlyn Selich as Batgirl
- Stephanie Sheh as Katana
- Tara Strong as Harley Quinn, Poison Ivy, Principal Taller
- Fred Tatasciore as Seven Sins

== Reception ==
Renee Longstreet for Common Sense Media gave the film a three out of five star rating and commented: "If derring-do and physical conflict are popular with girls as well as boys in today's marketplace, Warner Bros., DC Comics, and Lego have created a franchise that continues to build an audience. How enviable that is remains a question that parents and professionals consider. Does the violence go down easier for an 8-year-old when the participants are tiny plastic toys? Lego DC SuperHero Girls: Super-Villain High is filled with scenes of can-do girls battling and outwitting the power-hungry Lena Luthor and her temporary accomplices. The story is easy to follow, has suspense and a few mild twists and turns, and does offer some opportunities for messages about friendship, trust, competition, and teamwork. And there's some fun as well, as the girls -- in control at all times -- prove to be as unstoppable as they are smart and kind".

== See also ==
- DC Super Hero Girls
- Lego DC Super Hero Girls
- Lego DC Super Hero Girls: Brain Drain
