= DC Super Hero Girls: Legends of Atlantis =

- DVD cover
- Directed by: Cecilia Aranovich; Ian Hamilton
- Written by: Shea Fontana
- Based on: DC Super Hero Girls by: Shea Fontana; Lisa Yee; Aria Moffy
- Produced by: Jennifer Coyle; Sam Register (executive producer); Paula Haifley
- Starring: Teala Dunn; Anais Fairweather; Grey Griffin; Tara Strong; Stephanie Sheh; Mae Whitman
- Edited by: Rob Ehrenreich; Molly Yahr
- Music by: Shawn Drew
- Production companies: DC Entertainment; Warner Bros. Animation
- Distributed by: Warner Bros. Home Entertainment
- Release dates: July 22, 2018 (San Diego Comic-Con); October 2, 2018 (digital and DVD)
- Running time: 72 minutes
- Country: United States
- Language: English

DC Super Hero Girls: Legends of Atlantis is a 2018 American animated superhero film based on the DC Super Hero Girls web series, produced by Warner Bros. Animation and distributed by Warner Bros. Home Entertainment. It is the fifth and final film in the DC Super Hero Girls films before it got rebooted by Lauren Faust, and it takes place in the Season 4 timeframe. It premiered at San Diego Comic-Con on July 22, 2018 and was released digitally and on DVD on October 2.

== Premise ==
An uneventful day at school until the powerful Book of Legends is suddenly stolen from Super Hero High. In order to uncover the mystery, Wonder Woman, Batgirl, Supergirl, Bumblebee and the rest of the Super Crew must journey through the depths of the ocean to Atlantis. There, the girls encounter Mera and Siren, the ocean-dwelling thieves, who prove to be a formidable match. In order to recover the stolen tome and return it to its rightful place, DC Super Hero Girls must band together and use their collective powers to successfully get back to land.

Meanwhile, after Raven's accident, Batgirl and Supergirl's powers are swapped and Harley Quinn does everything she can to help Raven control her magic.

== Cast ==
- Yvette Nicole Brown as Principal Waller
- Greg Cipes as Beast Boy
- Teala Dunn as Bumblebee
- Anais Fairweather as Supergirl
- Nika Futterman as Hawkgirl
- Grey Griffin as Wonder Woman
- Julianne Grossman as Hippolyta
- Tania Gunadi as Lady Shiva
- Josh Keaton as Flash
- Tom Kenny as Commissioner Gordon, Crazy Quilt
- Misty Lee as Big Barda
- Erica Lindbeck as Mera, Siren
- Danica McKellar as Frost
- Max Mittelman as Aquaman
- Khary Payton as Cyborg
- Stephanie Sheh as Katana
- Tara Strong as Harley Quinn, Poison Ivy, Raven
- Fred Tatasciore as Burly Man
- Hynden Walch as Starfire
- Mae Whitman as Batgirl

== Release ==
The film was released on DVD and digitally on October 2, 2018.

== See also ==
- List of underwater science fiction works
