= Tania Gunadi =

Indonesian actress (born 1983)

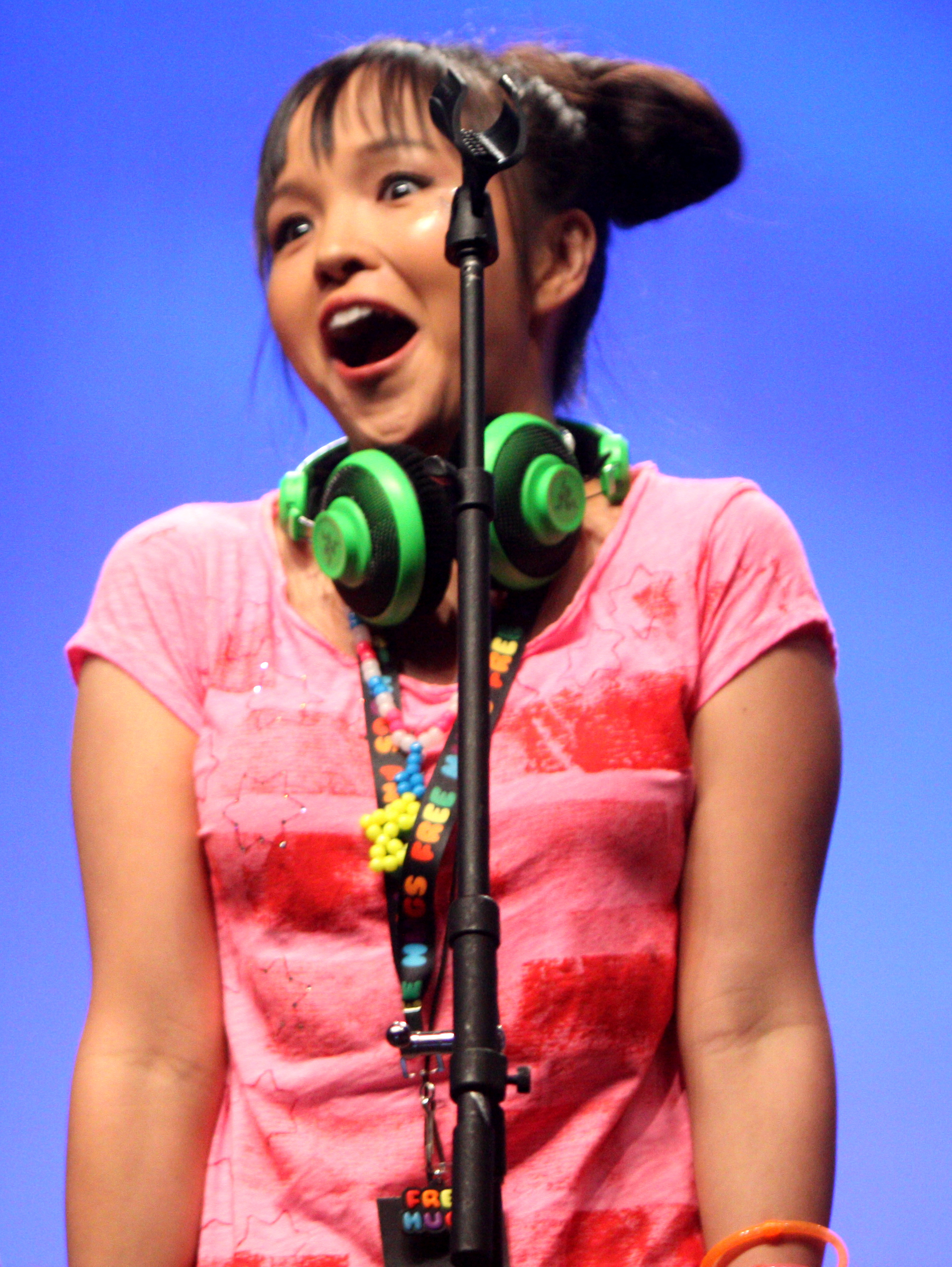
- Gunadi at VidCon 2012
- Born: 29 July 1983 (age 43); Bandung, West Java, Indonesia
- Occupation: Actress
- Years active: 2001–present

Tania Gunadi (born 29 July 1983) is an Indonesian actress. She moved to Los Angeles when she was a teenager.

She is best known for playing Emma Lau / Dark Tamera on Aaron Stone, Miko Nakadai on Transformers: Prime, Sashi Kobayashi on Penn Zero: Part-Time Hero, Sakti Deon / Techno on MyMusic, and Pliny on StuGo.

== Biography ==
Gunadi was born in Bandung, Indonesia. She won a green card lottery when she was a teenager and moved to Los Angeles. When she first moved to the US, she attended a free program for adult ESL students to learn English. She then went to university in Los Angeles. Her first job was working at Pizza Hut as a telephone operator. Gunadi then decided to pursue an acting career after she landed a part in a Disneyland commercial.

== Filmography ==
=== Film ===
Year	Title	Role	Notes
2001	A Real Job	Tanya, Tammy, & Tina	
2003	Lock Her Room	Girl	Short film
2003	Nudity Required	Voodoo Disco Queen	
2004	Eulogy	Girl in dorm room	
2005	The Magic of Ordinary Days	Florence	
2006	Especial	Tuffle	
2009	Bob Funk	Connie	
2009	Spring Breakdown	Wheelchair girl	
2011	Dangerously Close		Short film; also line producer
2012	Adventures in Zambezia	Tini	Voice
2012	Possessions	Janice	
2013	Cloudy with a Chance of Meatballs 2	Additional voices	
2014	Such Good People	Priti Khadga	
2015	Blackhat		Uncredited
2016	Special Forces	Genesis	Also co-producer
2016	The Interview	Candy	Short film
2017	DC Super Hero Girls: Intergalactic Games	Lady Shiva	Voice, direct-to-video
2017	Scooby-Doo! Shaggy's Showdown	Carol	Voice
2017	The Jetsons & WWE: Robo-WrestleMania!	Gladys the Receptionist	Voice
2018	DC Super Hero Girls: Legends of Atlantis	Lady Shiva	Voice, direct-to-video
2019	Unconditionally	Jen	Short film; also producer
2021	Raya and the Last Dragon	Additional voices	
2022	Marmaduke	Cheerleader #1	Voice
2022	The Soccer Football Movie	Nautai	Voice
2022	The Angkasa Legacy	The Woman	Short film

=== Television ===
Year	Title	Role	Notes
2001	That's Life	Foreign Student	Episode: "Oh, Baby!"
2001	The Wild Thornberrys: The Origin of Donnie	Forest Animals	Voice, television film
2002	Even Stevens	Allison Wong	2 episodes
2002	Haunted	Anorexic Girl	Episode: "Seeking Asylum"
2003	All About the Andersons	Kim	"Pilot"
2003	Boston Public	Sri Sumarto	3 episodes
2004	Pixel Perfect	Cindy	Television film
2005	The Magic of Ordinary Days	Florence	Television film
2005	Go Figure	Mojo	Television film
2005	Wiener Park	Song Mi Sook	Television pilot
2007	It's Always Sunny in Philadelphia	Sun-Li	Episode: "The Gang Solves the North Korea Situation"
2009–2010	Aaron Stone	Emma Lau, Dark Tamara	Main role, 35 episodes
2010–2013	Transformers: Prime	Miko Nakadai	Voice, main role
2012	Imagination Movers	Princess Dee	Episode: "Have You Ever Seen a Unicorn"
2012–2014	MyMusic	Techno	Main role, 58 episodes
2013	Snow Bride	Julie	Television film
2014	Enlisted	Pvt. Cindy Park	Recurring role, 13 episodes
2014, 2016	Sanjay and Craig	Sam	Voice, 2 episodes
2014–2017	Penn Zero: Part-Time Hero	Sashi Kobayashi	Voice, main role (53 episodes)
2015	DC Super Hero Girls	Lady Shiva	Voice, 8 episodes
2015	Girl Meets World	Harper Burgess	2 episodes
2015	The Drunk Lonely Wives Book Club	Soo-lin	Episode: "March"
2015–2016	Sofia the First	Miss Elodie	Voice, 3 episodes
2016	DC Super Hero Girls: Super Hero High	Lady Shiva	Voice, television film
2016	Girls vs. Aliens	Sapphire	Voice, direct-to-video
2016	Graves	Summer	7 episodes
2016	DC Super Hero Girls: Hero of the Year	Lady Shiva	Voice, television film
2016, 2019	Star vs. the Forces of Evil	Tala Ordonia	Voice, 2 episodes
2017	Avengers Assemble	Xiaoyi Chen / Iso	Voice, episode: "Civil War Part 2: The Mighty Avengers"
2018	Super Single	Gipsy	Episode: "Sexy Boudoir Photoshoot"
2018	Fancy Nancy	Miss Kimberly	Voice, 2 episodes
2018–2019	Shimmer and Shine	Princess Adara	Voice, 4 episodes
2018–2020	Rise of the Teenage Mutant Ninja Turtles	Kendra	Voice, 4 episodes
2019	Bizaardvark	Natalie	Episode: "A Capella Problems"
2019	A.P. Bio	Sarah	Episode: "Toledo's Top 100"
2019	The Lion Guard	Lumba-Lumba	Voice, episode: "Dragon Island"
2021	Trese	Amie, Hannah, Jiangshi	3 episodes
2022	Cars on the Road	Lisa	Voice, episode: "Lights Out"
2023	Skull Island	Islander	Voice, episode: "You'll Never Catch A Monkey That Way"
2023	Craig of the Creek	Maria	Voice, episode: "Who is the Red Poncho?"
2024	Curb Your Enthusiasm	Chunhua	Episode: "Ken/Kendra"
2025	StuGo	Pliny	Voice, main role
2026	Chibiverse	Pliny	Voice, episode: "Mystery Busters"
2026	Avatar: Seven Havens	Tanushree, Various voices	Voice

=== Video games ===
Year	Title	Role	Notes
2008	Crash: Mind over Mutant	Brat Girl	
2012	Transformers: Prime – The Game	Miko Nakadai	
2015	Star Wars: Uprising	Okuvim the Younge	
2016	World of Final Fantasy	Ifreeta	
2016	Mobile Legends: Bang Bang	Lunox	
2019	Indivisible	Ajna	
2019	League of Legends	Alune	
2021	Legends of Runeterra	Alune	
2023	Avatar: Generations	Rangi	

=== Web ===
Year	Title	Role	Notes
2025	How Not To Draw	Pliny	Episode: "How Not To Draw Dr. Lullah"

=== Commercials ===
Year	Advertiser	Promoting	Theme	Country
2009	T-mobile	My Faves from T-mobile		United States
2011	Honda	Civic Si	Hoodie Ninja	United States
2011	Target	Back to school so much glitter	2nd grade teacher	United States
2012	AT&T	AT&T wireless 4G network	Shopping for hats	United States
2013	McDonald's	McDonald's monopoly game	Prizes	United States
2013	McDonald's	McDonald's monopoly game	Premios	Spanish territories
2013	McDonald's	McDonald's monopoly game	Podrías ganar	Spanish territories
2013	IBM		Dress Shop	United States
2015	Summer's Eve	Lavender night-time cleansing wash, cleansing cloths, cleansing bar	Shower	United States
2016	Lowe's	10 to 30 percent off appliances $396 or more	Giraffes rule: worry free	United States
2020	Lay's	Lay's	Surprise	United States
2020	T-Mobile	T-Mobile	5g Coverage Map	United States
2024	Capital One	Capital One Venture Credit Card	A League of Their Own	United States
