= Werewolf Game =

- Theatrical release poster
- Directed by: Jackie Payne; Cara Brennan
- Written by: Jackie Payne
- Produced by: Rob Margolies; Gretel Snyder; David Thomas Newman
- Starring: Tony Todd; Lydia Hearst; Bai Ling; Robert Picardo
- Cinematography: Miguel Zamora
- Edited by: Arick Salmea
- Music by: Luca Balboni
- Production company: Different Duck Films
- Release date: January 21, 2025
- Running time: 97 minutes
- Country: United States
- Language: English

Werewolf Game is a 2025 American horror film written by Jackie Payne, directed by Payne and Cara Brennan and starring Tony Todd, Lydia Hearst, Bai Ling, and Robert Picardo.

== Plot ==
Twelve strangers wake up on a remote island with no memory of how they got there. They come from different backgrounds — students, professionals, soldiers, influencers, loners — people who seem to have nothing in common. Their confusion turns to fear when they’re addressed by a booming voice through a loudspeaker. A figure in a mask and black robes, calling himself The Judge, explains the rules of the game they are now forced to play the real-life version of the party game Werewolf.

Some of them are secretly designated as werewolves. The rest are villagers. Each night, the werewolves will choose one player to kill. Each day, the survivors will vote to eliminate someone they suspect to be a werewolf. The game ends only when the werewolves are eliminated or when they outnumber the villagers.

Panic sets in quickly. Nobody knows who to trust, and no one admits to being a werewolf. Guards patrol the island, preventing escape, and surveillance cameras are mounted everywhere. Attempts to flee or rebel are met with swift punishment. With no other option, the group hesitantly agrees to play the game.

On the first night, one of the players is brutally killed off-screen. The next morning, the group finds the corpse and is horrified. They're forced to vote. Suspicion falls randomly, and a nervous, quiet man is selected and executed by the game's enforcers. The group is shaken what if he wasn't a werewolf?

As days pass, the game grows more intense. Paranoia spreads. Some players begin forming alliances, while others isolate themselves. A charismatic leader tries to rally the group into voting strategically, but others think he might be manipulating them. Accusations fly, friendships crumble, and personalities clash.

At night, the killings are vicious and precise. The werewolves move silently, masked and armed with deadly claws. Their perspective is occasionally shown through a predator-like thermal vision, lending a haunting, dehumanizing tone to their attacks. No one is safe.

The Judge watches the players with cold amusement, occasionally offering cryptic commentary and revealing just enough information to stoke tension. The players begin to speculate about why they were chosen. Are they part of an experiment? A sadistic entertainment show? Punishment? Answers are never given.

Midway through the game, a few players try to rebel. They plan an escape using a gap in guard patrols, but their attempt is discovered. One of them is killed as an example, while the others are forced back into the game. Morale plummets.

As the number of players dwindles, things become more desperate. A twist reveals that one of the kindest, most trustworthy villagers was a werewolf all along, completely shattering the survivors' faith in their own judgment. Another player, overwhelmed with guilt after wrongly voting out an innocent person, takes their own life.

Eventually, it comes down to four survivors. The number of werewolves is revealed, two remain. The final few rounds of the game become a nerve-racking battle of wits, where every look and every sentence could mean life or death. A final vote is called. One player sacrifices themselves, claiming they are a werewolf to protect someone they believe to be innocent. It turns out to be a fatal mistake.

In the end, the surviving players are left emotionally and physically wrecked. The werewolves are unmasked, but it's unclear if this means the game is over. The Judge congratulates the winners but offers no answers. The screen fades to black with the survivors still trapped on the island.

== Cast ==
- Tony Todd as The Judge
- Lydia Hearst as Monika
- Bai Ling as Demi
- Teala Dunn as Pepper
- Robert Picardo as Bill
- Tim Realbuto as Raymond
- James Crittenden as Zak
- Tabitha Jane as Natalie
- Peter MK McManus as Matt
- Ethan Ingle as Emmitt
- Cara Claymore as Chris
- André Tempfer as Seth
- Chaim Rochester as Guard #4
- Liefia Ingalls as Guard #1
- Joe Wells as Guard #3
- Chris Burke as Guard #2
- Tyler Gattoni as The Captain

== Production ==
In March 2022, it was announced that Todd, Hearst, Ling, Dunn and Picardo were all cast in the film. Later that month, it was announced that Realbuto was added to the cast.

== Release ==
In November 2024, the film has been completed and has a limited release in the United States and released in streaming platforms on January 21, 2025.

== Reception ==
Simon Henderson of Blazing Minds gave the film a 2 stars over 5 stars and he wrote;

Overall, this isn't the worst film I've ever seen. It has moments, few and far between, of possibilities with a higher budget and a better cast, I can legitimately see this being a really good film.

Janine Pipe of Nerdly gave the film a rating of 2 over 5 she said; Werewolf Game is worth a watch if you’re a fan of elimination game stories, a horror spin on something like King of Killers if you will. So if you like that concept then definitely give this film a try.

Giving a verdict of 4 over 10, Rebecca of FilmCarnage.com gave the film a negative review she wrote; it struggles to give you something to invest in, the characters aren’t strong enough, the progression is problematic and there’s only a fairly weak attempt at building an air of conspiracy.
