= DC Super Hero Girls =

American multipronged superhero web series

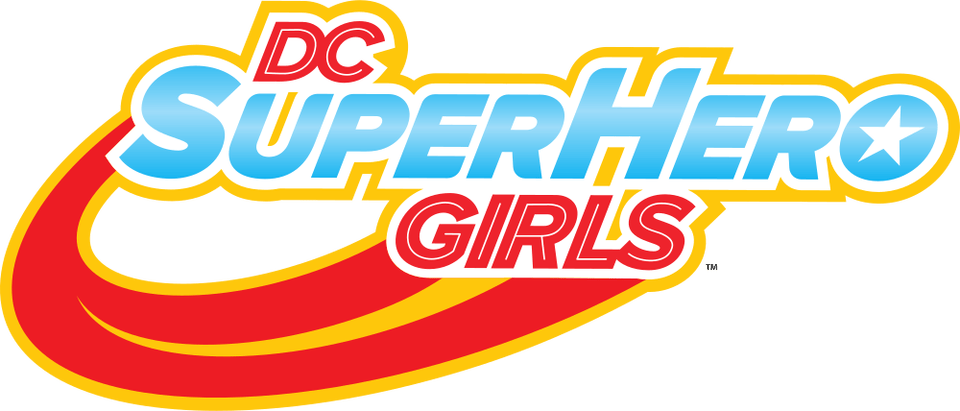
- Genre: Action; Adventure; Superhero; Comedy drama
- Created by: Shea Fontana; Lisa Yee; Aria Moffly
- Based on: Characters by DC Comics
- Written by: Shea Fontana; Nina G. Bargiel
- Directed by: Jennifer Coyle; Cecilia Aranovich
- Voices of: Yvette Nicole Brown; Teala Dunn; Grey Griffin; Anais Fairweather; Ashlyn Selich; Stephanie Sheh; Cristina Milizia; Tara Strong; Mae Whitman
- Theme music composer: The Math Club featuring Colton Fisher and Jason Rabinowitz
- Opening theme: "Get Your Cape On" by Jordyn Kane
- Composer: Shaun Drew
- Country of origin: United States
- Original language: English
- No. of seasons: 5
- No. of episodes: 112 (list of episodes)

Production
- Executive producer: Sam Register
- Producers: Jennifer Coyle; Paula Haifley
- Running time: 11–15 minutes
- Production companies: DC Entertainment; Warner Bros. Animation

Original release
- Network: YouTube
- Release: 1 October 2015 – 27 December 2018

Related
- DC Super Hero Girls (2019)

DC Super Hero Girls, also released as DC Superhero Girls, is an American animated superhero web series produced by Warner Bros. Animation for Cartoon Network based on characters from DC Entertainment that launched in the third quarter of 2015.

The DC Super Hero Girls series was later reimagined by Lauren Faust, who had previously worked on The Powerpuff Girls, Foster's Home for Imaginary Friends, and My Little Pony: Friendship Is Magic. This resulted in a full rebrand for the series, centered around an eponymous television reboot of the same name, which began airing on Cartoon Network in March 2019. The rebooted series was inspired by Faust's DC Nation Shorts entry Super Best Friends Forever from 2012, while carrying over certain themes from the earlier DC Super Hero Girls web series.

== Overview ==
=== Premise ===
At Super Hero High School, DC heroes attend classes and manage growing up while having superpowers.

== Announcement ==
The web series was announced in April 2015. Includes an graphic novel line, books from Random House, Lego tie-ins and action figures from Mattel. The intended audience is girls aged 6–12.

== Website ==
The website was launched in early July 2015. Characters featured at launch were: Wonder Woman, Batgirl, Supergirl, Harley Quinn, Poison Ivy, Katana, and Bumblebee. Other characters including Hal Jordan, Barry Allen, Star Sapphire, Beast Boy, Cheetah, Hawkgirl, and Catwoman also appear. Amanda Waller is featured as the principal of the series' setting, Super Hero High. Many other DC Comics heroes and villains appear in the background as cameos.

== Publication history ==
DC Super Hero Girls was originally launched in 2015 with an animated web series on YouTube. Over the course of 2016, the web series was expanded with a graphic novel line, additional animated and digital content, toys, and apparel. Diane Nelson, former president of both DC Entertainment and Warner Bros. Interactive Entertainment, stated in 2016: "We think DC Super Hero Girls can be bigger than a $1 billion brand".

A relaunch of the web series began with the 2019 DC Super Hero Girls TV series. Also that year, the DC Zoom imprint "launched with the continuation of [the] DC Super Hero Girls" graphic novel line. The DC Ink and DC Zoom imprints were built off both the creative success of the post-New 52 DCYou program, which "employed younger creators than the New 52 titles, with the titles having a more contemporary feel", and "the financial success of the DC Super Hero Girls property". Dan DiDio, DC's co-publisher from 2010 to 2020, explained that "a lot of that had also to do with our interest in getting the young adult marketplace. That was DC testing the waters and wondering what a young adult book would be from DC Comics".

== Episodes ==
The series was launched with a total of 112 episodes divided into 5 seasons. The first season premiered on 1 October 2015. The second season premiered on 21 April 2016. The third season premiered on 26 January 2017, while the fourth season premiered on 18 January 2018. The fifth and final season premiered on 2 August 2018 and ended on 27 December the same year as a cliffhanger.

== Cast and characters ==
DC Super Hero Girls has various characters inspired by the DC Universe. Certain characters are voiced by actors who have performed as the same characters previously. The characters listed below are listed on the franchise's website:

=== Voice cast ===
Voice actor	Character(s)
Grey Griffin	Wonder Woman; Giganta; Silver St. Cloud; Platinum; Robin
Anais Fairweather	Supergirl
Mae Whitman	Barbara Gordon/Batgirl (first voice); Speed Queen (first voice)
Tara Strong	Harley Quinn; Poison Ivy; Raven
Teala Dunn	Bumblebee; Artemiz
Stephanie Sheh	Katana; Bleez
Ashley Eckstein	Cheetah
Jessica DiCicco	Star Sapphire; Lashina
Hynden Walch	Starfire; Blackfire
Nika Futterman	Hawkgirl; Cheshire
Danica McKellar	Frost
Lauren Tom	Double Dare; Professor Minerva
Yvette Nicole Brown	Principal Waller; Bumblebee's Mom
Greg Cipes	Beast Boy
Josh Keaton	Hal Jordan/Green Lantern; Flash; Steve Trevor
Maurice LaMarche	Red Tornado; Oberon
Cristina Pucelli	Catwoman; Miss Martian; Amethyst; Violet Lantern Ring
Phil LaMarr	Lucius Fox; Killer Moth
John DiMaggio	Wildcat; Gorilla Grodd; Darkseid; Anti-Hall Monitor
Tom Kenny	Crazy Quilt; Commissioner James Gordon; Parasite; Sinestro; Lobo
Helen Slater	Martha Kent
Dean Cain	Jonathan Kent
Tania Gunadi	Lady Shiva
Fred Tatasciore	Killer Croc; Perry the Parademon; Solomon Grundy; Brainiac; Ares; Kryptomites; Swamp Thing
April Stewart	Granny Goodness; Stompa; June Moone
Misty Lee	Big Barda; Mad Harriet
Alexis Zall	Lois Lane
Khary Payton	Cyborg; Firefly; Lion-Mane
Julianne Grossman	Hippolyta
Anna Vocino	Oracle
Kevin Michael Richardson	Trigon; King Shark; Mrs. Clayface
Romi Dames	Lena Luthor
Cree Summer	Thunder
Kimberly Brooks	Vixen; Lightning
Cristina Milizia	Jessica Cruz
Matthew Mercer	Green Lantern Ring; Captain Cold
Erica Lindbeck	Mera; Siren
Ashlyn Selich	Barbara Gordon/Batgirl (second voice); Speed Queen (second voice)

== Reboot television series ==
In 2019, the DC Super Hero Girls was rebooted as a TV series developed by Lauren Faust, with a continuity separate from that of the previous version. Web series connected with the series began to be released online on 10 January (the first short had previously received a sneak peek screening with showings of Teen Titans Go! To the Movies), and the full series premiered on Cartoon Network on 8 March.

== Other media ==
=== Films and specials ===
==== Special (2016) ====
Title	Directed by	Written by	Original release date
"DC Super Hero Girls: Super Hero High"	Jennifer Coyle	Shea Fontana	19 March 2016 (Boomerang) 21 May 2016 (Boomerang UK) 30 May 2016 (Cartoon Network)
School is in session for DC Super Hero Girls. This is where students master their super powers to become the Super Heroes of tomorrow. When Supergirl crash lands into the cafeteria, it is evident that though she has incredible power, she has a long way to go before she becomes a Super Hero. As Supergirl learns to harness her powers, the Junior Detective Club investigates a mysterious rash of security breaches.

==== Direct-to-video films (2016–2018) ====
Title	Directed by	Written by	Original release date
"DC Super Hero Girls: Hero of the Year"	Cecilia Aranovich	Shea Fontana	23 August 2016
"DC Super Hero Girls: Intergalactic Games"	Cecilia Aranovich	Shea Fontana	23 May 2017
"Lego DC Super Hero Girls: Brain Drain"	Todd Grimes	Jeremy Adams	8 August 2017
"Lego DC Super Hero Girls: Super-Villain High"	Elsa Garagarza	Jeremy Adams	15 May 2018
"DC Super Hero Girls: Legends of Atlantis"	Cecilia Aranovich; Ian Hamilton	Shea Fontana	2 October 2018

=== Novels ===
Random House published a series of text-only novels. Lisa Yee wrote every novel for the original series which each focus primarily on one character's experiences as a student at Super Hero High. American "big box" retailer Target has released special editions of the Wonder Woman and Batgirl novels that include additional materials (character profiles and posters).

Title	ISBN	Release date
Wonder Woman at Super Hero High	978-1101940594	1 March 2016
Supergirl at Super Hero High	978-1101940624	5 July 2016
Batgirl at Super Hero High	978-1101940655	3 January 2017
Katana at Super Hero High	978-1101940686	4 July 2017
Harley Quinn at Super Hero High	978-1524769239	2 January 2018
Bumblebee at Super Hero High	978-1524769260	3 July 2018

=== Graphic novels ===
The DC Graphic Novels for Kids imprint published a series of graphic novels based on the series. In 2025, the series received a new graphic novel by creators Shea Fontana and Yancey Labat to commemorate its 10th-anniversary.

Title	ISBN	Release date
Finals Crisis	978-1-4012-6247-1	5 July 2016
Hits and Myths	978-1-4012-6761-2	1 November 2016
Summer Olympus	978-1-4012-7235-7	11 July 2017
Past Times at Super Hero High	978-1-4012-7383-5	26 September 2017
Date with Disaster	978-1-4012-7878-6	31 January 2018
Out of the Bottle	978-1-4012-7483-2	7 August 2018
Search for Atlantis	978-1-4012-8353-7	26 September 2018
Spaced Out	978-1-4012-8256-1	4 June 2019
High School Reunion		2 June 2026

=== Toys ===
From 2016 to 2018, Lego featured a product line using DC Super Hero Girls logo. 12 Lego sets were distributed. These sets used Lego Friends style mini-dolls figures rather than traditional Lego minifigure, a design aimed at feminine markets.
