= Misty Lee =

Magician, voice actress, comedian

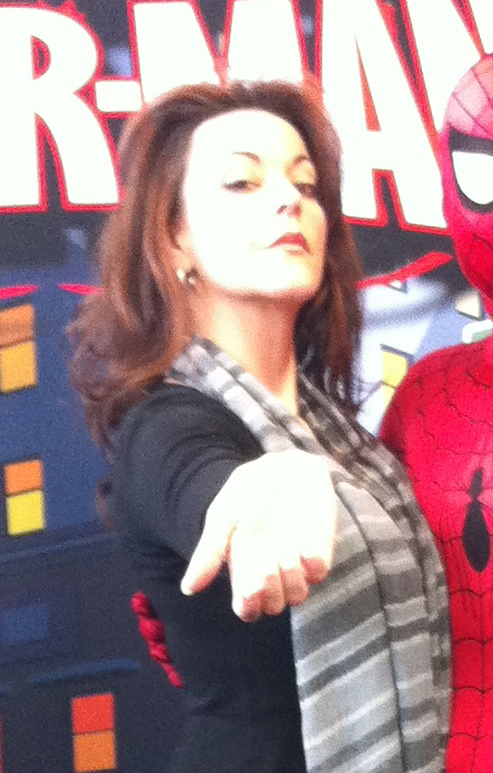
- Lee in 2012
- Born: Mount Clemens, Michigan, U.S.
- Occupations: Magician, voice actress, comedian, activist
- Years active: 2005–present
- Spouse: Paul Dini (m. 2005)

Misty Lee is an American voice actress, comedian and magician.

== Early life ==
Misty Lee was born in Mount Clemens, Michigan, and spent most of her childhood in Detroit, which she credits as inspiration for her unique sense of humor and interest in magic. She graduated from East Detroit High School where she was active in the arts and many theatrical productions. Before her calling as a magician, Lee trained in dentistry. At the age of sixteen, she discovered her interest in magic, which quickly took its hold on her.

== Career ==
Her onstage performances blend theatre, song, and sleight of hand. She has appeared (as herself) in several comic books, and is a co-creator (and also the voice) of Dinicartoons character Little Rashy. Lee's first venture into magic came when a former high school friend called her and asked if she would like to earn some money as an assistant in his magic act. She was later mentored by some of the leading names in professional magic, including Detroit-based magician Scorpio and illusionist Jonathan Pendragon.

In addition to magic, Lee is an accomplished voice actor, appearing in award-winning video games such as The Last of Us, BioShock Infinite, Grand Theft Auto V, Disney Infinity, the Fire Emblem series, God of War Ragnarök and more.

She also provided the voice of Aunt May Parker in Ultimate Spider-Man, which airs on Disney XD. At San Diego Comic-Con, Lee designed and taught custom effects to celebrity host and presenters for the "Magic of Comics" themed awards show.

In July 2017, Lee performed on Penn & Teller: Fool Us, but failed to fool the hosts.

Lee studied and performed both sketch and musical improv comedy at The Second City in Los Angeles.

She plays the character Misty Hannah in the backstory to Ingress.

== Contributions to magic ==
In 2010, Lee became a staff Séance Medium at Hollywood's Magic Castle, where she regularly performs Houdini Séances. She is the first female magician in history to hold this position.

Lee is the only magician ever to be admitted into the Institute for Analytic Interviewing. Under the training of "Truth Wizard" J.J. Newberry, and alongside agents from the CIA, ATF, and Scotland Yard, Lee mastered the art of cognitive interview techniques, giving her the nickname of "Human Lie Detector".

== Personal life ==
Lee is married to animation producer and comic book author Paul Dini, with whom she lives in Los Angeles. Their two Boston Terriers, Mugsy and Deuce, were featured in "Anger Management", a 2012 episode of The Dog Whisperer, in which they sought Cesar Millan's help with their dogs' behavioral problems.

She is fluent in American Sign Language and has worked as a theatrical sign interpreter for Michigan State University.

Lee is an activist against domestic abuse. In 2013, Lee wrote and starred in a short PSA on behalf of the Domestic Violence Hotline titled Escape. The video is a "love letter to [her] mother", who endured years of verbal abuse.

== Filmography ==
=== Live-action roles ===
- Birth of Hollywood – Actress
- The $178.92 Movie: An Instruction Guide to Failure
- The Last of Us – Clickers (voice only)

=== Animation roles ===
Year	Title	Role	Notes	Source
2010–13	The Garfield Show	Scheherazade, Angie		
2012–17	Ultimate Spider-Man	Aunt May, Squirrel Girl		
2014–16	TripTank	Various voices		
2015	Hulk and the Agents of S.M.A.S.H.	Betty Ross	Episode "Banner Day"	
2015–18	DC Super Hero Girls	Big Barda, Mad Harriet		
2016	Wabbit	Mushroom Beings, Female Executive		
2016	Red Sonja: Queen of Plagues	Red Sonja		
2016	DC Super Hero Girls: Hero of the Year	Big Barda		
2017	DC Super Hero Girls: Intergalactic Games	Big Barda		
2018	DC Super Hero Girls: Legends of Atlantis	Big Barda		
2018–23	Aggretsuko	Kabae	English dub	
2019	Lego City Adventures	Freya McCloud	Episode "Cubs and Robbers/Billy the Bug"	
2020	Amphibia	Priscilla the Killa	Episode "Hopping Mall"	
2022	Bastard!! Heavy Metal, Dark Fantasy	Anthrasax, Baba (season 2)	English dub	
2022	Angelo Rules	Butterfingers, Monica	English dub	
2023	Mickey and Friends Trick or Treats	Witch Hazel		
2025–present	Talon	Razer, Droma, Fury SFX		

- Cereal Mascots: Trix Rabbit – Dante

=== Video games ===
Year	Title	Voice role	Notes	Ref.
2013	The Last of Us	Infected		
2013	Grand Theft Auto V	The Local Population		
2013	Killzone: Shadow Fall	Linden		
2013	Ingress	Misty Hannah		
2014	Hearthstone	Grand Widow Faerlina, Lady Liadrin		
2014	The Amazing Spider-Man 2	Jean DeWolff		
2014	Spider-Man Unlimited	Spider Ma'am / Aunt May		
2015	Skylanders: SuperChargers	Star Strike, Spotlight		
2015	Star Wars Battlefront	Princess Leia Organa		
2016	Lego Marvel's Avengers	She-Hulk, Squirrel Girl		
2016	Master of Orion: Conquer the Stars	Silicoid Advisor		
2016	Mirror's Edge Catalyst	Dispatch, KrugerSec Guard		
2017	Fire Emblem Heroes	Ursula, Camilla, Titania	English dub	
2017	Star Wars Battlefront II	Princess Leia Organa		
2018	Darksiders III	Envy, Human		
2018	Just Cause 4	Garland		
2018	Spyro: Reignited Trilogy	Additional voices		
2019	Crash Team Racing Nitro-Fueled	Polar, Pura, Tawna		
2019	Star Wars Jedi: Fallen Order	Masana Tide / Ninth Sister		
2020	Chex Quest HD	Dr. O'Ryen		
2020	G.I. Joe: Operation Blackout	Baroness		
2021	Ratchet & Clank: Rift Apart	Robot Pirates, Additional Voices		
2023	Fire Emblem Engage	Camilla		
2023	Hi-Fi Rush	Rekka		
2023	Star Wars Jedi: Survivor	Masana Tide / Ninth Sister		
2025	Raidou Remastered: The Mystery of the Soulless Army	Additional voices		
2025	Story of Seasons: Grand Bazaar	Clara, additional voices		
2025	Dune Awakening	Various voices		
2026	God of War Sons of Sparta	Adrasteia		
2026	Grand Theft Auto VI	The Local Population		

- Agents of Mayhem – Daisy
- Batman: Arkham City – Museum Announcer, Dispatch Officer
- BioShock Infinite – various voices
- Call of Duty: Black Ops 6 - Voice in Case's head
- Call of Duty: Infinite Warfare - Laura Gibson
- Dead Rising 3 – Darlene Fleischermacher
- Disney Infinity – additional voices
- Fallout 4 – Talia McGovern, Molly, Settlers, additional voices
- Fallout 4: Far Harbor – Harbormen, Synth Refugees
- Fallout 4: Nuka-World – Cora, Kate, N.I.R.A., Tula Spinney, Pack Captives
- Genshin Impact - Barbeloth (2023–2026) (Note: Replaced by Harriet Kershaw)
- God of War – Sigrun, additional voices
- God of War Ragnarök – Sigrun, additional voices
- Guild Wars 2: Path of Fire – Rox
- Infamous Second Son – Hank's Daughter, additional voices
- League of Legends – Kalista (the Spear of Vengeance)
- Lego DC Super-Villains – Enchantress, Ravager
- Resident Evil: Revelations 2 – additional voices
- Saints Row IV – Dominatrix
- Skylanders: Swap Force – Star Strike
- StarCraft II: Legacy of the Void - Liberator
- World of Warcraft: Battle for Azeroth – Lady Liadrin
