= Stephanie Sheh =

American voice actress (born 1977)

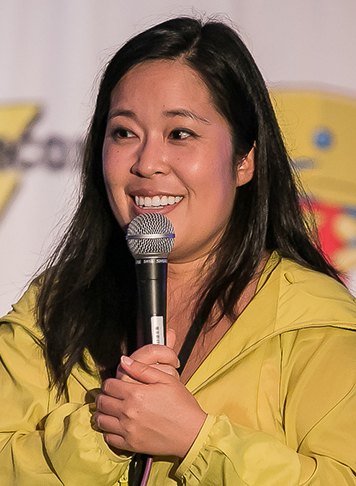
- Sheh in 2016
- Born: Stephanie Ru-Phan Sheh; April 10, 1977 (age 49); Kalamazoo, Michigan, U.S.
- Education: University of California, Los Angeles
- Occupations: Voice actress; ADR director; writer; casting director; producer
- Years active: 1999–present
- Agent: Atlas Talent
- Political party: Democratic
- Website: stephaniesheh.com

Stephanie Ru-Phan Sheh (born April 10, 1977) is an American voice actress, ADR director, writer, and producer who has worked for several major companies. She is often involved with work in English dubs of anime, cartoons, video games, and films. Her notable voice roles include Hinata Hyuga in the Naruto franchise, Orihime Inoue in Bleach, Usagi Tsukino / Sailor Moon in the Viz Media redub of Sailor Moon, Lotte Jansson in Little Witch Academia, Yui Hirasawa in K-On!, Eureka in Eureka Seven, Armor in X-Men, Katana in DC Super Hero Girls, Mikuru Asahina in The Melancholy of Haruhi Suzumiya, Yui in Sword Art Online, Illyasviel von Einzbern in Fate/stay night, Mamimi Samejima in FLCL, Blanca in White Snake and Green Snake and Mitsuha Miyamizu in Your Name.

== Career ==
Stephanie Ru-Phan Sheh was born on April 10, 1977, in Kalamazoo, Michigan, to a family of Han Chinese descent; her mother is from Mainland China (specifically Beijing) and her father is from Taiwan (specifically Penghu). Sheh was raised in Northern California, however, she spent most of her childhood in Taiwan. Sheh became interested in acting during her school years, in which she took part in a play. While at the University of California, Los Angeles she was involved in anime clubs. She graduated from UCLA in 1999.

Under the moniker of Jennifer Sekiguchi, Sheh made her voice acting debut as Silky in I'm Gonna Be An Angel! in 2001. During this time, she worked at Synch-Point, which produced English dubs for anime. During her time at Synch-Point, she also produced the dub for I'm Gonna Be An Angel! Sheh was also responsible for the involvement of Marc Handler in FLCL.

Stephanie Sheh's later voice roles include Orihime Inoue in Bleach, Eureka in Eureka Seven, and Hinata Hyuga in Naruto. The three shows have aired on Adult Swim and Cartoon Network to varied success. Sheh describes Hinata's issues with self-esteem as "relatable."

In addition to anime roles, Sheh has provided voicework for the video game industry. Sheh has reprised her role as Orihime Inoue in Bleach video games as well as contributed to BioShock 2, Aion: The Tower of Eternity, Devil May Cry 4, Grand Theft Auto V, and Resident Evil 5. Roles beyond voice acting include motion capture for the Sega title Bayonetta.

Sheh has appeared several times on G4's Attack of the Show! as "Tiny Olivia Munn". In 2012, she was a host in the 2011 Talk-Show TV series BPM: Beats Per Mnet.

In 2011, she formed the fundraising organization We Heart Japan in response to the 2011 Tōhoku earthquake and tsunami.

In 2012, she voiced Share Bear in Care Bears: Welcome to Care-a-Lot.

In 2013, she reprised the role of Eureka in Eureka Seven: Astral Ocean.

In July 2014, at the 2014 Anime Expo, Viz Media revealed details regarding its upcoming Sailor Moon voice cast. Sheh was announced to be the voice of Usagi Tsukino / Sailor Moon in Viz's redub of the first anime series, as well as the series reboot Sailor Moon Crystal.

On February 2, 2017, upon the release of Fire Emblem Heroes, Sheh voiced as Tharja from Fire Emblem Awakening. Sheh later went on to voice later iterations of Tharja herself.

== Filmography ==
=== Anime ===
List of dubbing performances in anime
| Year | Title | Role | Crew Role, Notes | Source |
|---|---|---|---|---|
| 2001 | I'm Gonna Be An Angel! | Silky | Debut anime role as Jennifer Sekiguchi in some episodes | |
| 2002 | I My Me! Strawberry Eggs | Fujio Himejima | As Jennifer Sekiguchi | CA |
| 2003 | FLCL | Mamimi Samejima | As Jennifer Sekiguchi | |
| 2004 | Marmalade Boy | Yayoi Takase, Chris | As Jennifer Sekiguchi | CA |
| 2005 | Daphne in the Brilliant Blue | Yukari Hanaoka | As Lulu Chiang | CA |
| 2005 | Zatch Bell! | Penny, Shion Hibiki | | CA |
| 2005 | Tenjho Tenge | Aya Natsume | As Tiffany Hsieh | CA |
| 2005 | Girls Bravo series | Kirie Kojima | As Lulu Chiang | |
| 2005 | DearS | Natsuki Ikuhara | As Jennifer Sekiguchi | CA |
| 2005 | Mars Daybreak | Megumi Higashihara | | CA |
| 2005 | Samurai Champloo | Koza | Episode: "Misguided Miscreants" | As Jennifer Sekiguchi; CA |
| 2005 | Bottle Fairy | Hororo | As Jennifer Sekiguchi | CA |
| 2005–09 | Naruto | Hinata Hyuga | | |
| 2005–06 | Gankutsuou: The Count of Monte Cristo | Haydee | As Jennifer Sekiguchi | CA |
| 2005–06 | Immortal Grand Prix | Bella DeMarco, Yuri Jin | TV series | CA |
| 2006–07 | Haré+Guu series | Guu | As Jennifer Sekiguchi | |
| 2006–07 | Eureka Seven | Eureka | As Jennifer Sekiguchi | CA |
| 2006–07 | Fate/stay night | Illyasviel von Einzbern, News reporter | As Jennifer Sekiguchi | CA |
| 2006 | Boys Be... | Yumi Kazama | | |
| 2006 | Lupin III: Part II | Margaret Queen, Angelica | 2 episodes | |
| 2006 | Destiny of the Shrine Maiden | Himeko Kurusugawa | As Jennifer Sekiguchi | |
| 2006 | Gun X Sword | Wendy | As Jennifer Sekiguchi | CA |
| 2006 | MÄR | Alma, Belle | | CA |
| 2006 | Nanaka 6/17 | Satsuki Arashiyama | | |
| 2006–14 | Bleach | Orihime Inoue, Isane Kotetsu | | |
| 2007 | The Melancholy of Haruhi Suzumiya | Mikuru Asahina | | CA |
| 2007 | Digimon Data Squad | Megumi Shirakawa | | Resume |
| 2008 | Lucky Star | Akira Kogami | | |
| 2008 | Gurren Lagann | Kinon Bachika | | |
| 2008–09 | Code Geass: Lelouch of the Rebellion | Kaguya Sumeragi | | CA |
| 2009–19 | Naruto: Shippuden | Hinata Hyuga, Rin Nohara | | |
| 2010–14 | Mobile Suit Gundam Unicorn | Audrey Burne | Also ADR director | |
| 2010–11 | Eden of the East | Micchon | | |
| 2010–11 | Marvel Anime | Hisako Ichiki/Armor, Miyuki, Agent Tsukino | | |
| 2011–12 | K-On! | Yui Hirasawa | 2 TV series, and live-action promotional material | |
| 2011 | Kashimashi: Girl Meets Girl | Hazumu Osaragi | | |
| 2012–25 | Blue Exorcist | Kuro, Yukio Okumura (young), Lucy Yang | Also OVA | |
| 2012–13 | Tiger & Bunny | Kriem | | |
| 2013 | Fate/Zero | Illyasviel von Einzbern | | |
| 2013 | K | Neko | | |
| 2013 | Accel World | Chiyuri Kurashima / Lime Bell | | |
| 2013–21 | Sword Art Online | Yui | | |
| 2014–18 | Yo-kai Watch | Sarah | (Seasons 1–2) | |
| 2014–19 | Sailor Moon | Usagi Tsukino / Sailor Moon | Viz dub | |
| 2014–15 | Kill la Kill | Nui Harime | | |
| 2015 | Magi: The Kingdom of Magic | Scheherazade | | |
| 2015 | The Disappearance of Nagato Yuki-chan | Mikuru Asahina | | |
| 2015 | Hyperdimension Neptunia: The Animation | Histoire, Abnes | | |
| 2015 | Fate/stay night: Unlimited Blade Works | Illyasviel von Einzbern | | |
| 2015 | JoJo's Bizarre Adventure | Suzie Q | | |
| 2015 | Little Witch Academia | Lotte Yanson, Jasminka Antonenko | | |
| 2015 | Glitter Force | Cody | Saban Localization of Smile PreCure! | |
| 2015, 2018, 2021 | The Seven Deadly Sins | Zeal | | |
| 2015–17 | Sailor Moon Crystal | Usagi Tsukino / Sailor Moon | | |
| 2016 | Your Lie in April | Nagi Aiza | | |
| 2016 | Cyborg 009 VS Devilman | Françoise Arnoul / Cyborg 003 | OVA series | |
| 2016 | Danganronpa 3: The End of Hope's Peak Academy | Mikan Tsumiki | Despair Arc | |
| 2016 | Sengoku Basara: End of Judgement | Kasuga | | |
| 2016–17 | Erased | Kayo Hinazuki | | |
| 2017 | Mobile Suit Gundam SEED | Lacus Clyne | NYAV Post dub | |
| 2017 | Glitter Force Doki Doki | Mackenzie Mack/Glitter Spade, Rory | Saban localization of DokiDoki! PreCure | |
| 2018 | Terraformars | Nina Yuzik, Erica Nakanojo, Joyce, Rachel | | |
| 2018–24 | Boruto: Naruto Next Generations | Hinata Uzumaki | | |
| 2019 | Cannon Busters | Casey Turnbuckle, 1337 | | |
| 2020 | Marvel Future Avengers | Crystal | | |
| 2021 | High-Rise Invasion | Kuon Shinzaki | | |
| 2021 | Magatsu Wahrheit Zuerst | Minerva Gutheil | | |
| 2021 | Dropout Idol Fruit Tart | Nua Nakamachi | | |
| 2022 | Kotaro Lives Alone | Mizuki Akitomo, Kino | | |
| 2022 | Vampire in the Garden | Pamela, Kubo's Wife | Dubbing Casting Lead | |
| 2022 | Fate/Grand Carnival | Sitonai | | |
| 2022 | Kingdom | Bai Cui | Episode: "A Mutual Self-Confidence" | |
| 2022 | Komi Can't Communicate | Ayami Sasaki, Kazuya Onemine, Itsuya Oki | | |
| 2022–present | Bleach: Thousand-Year Blood War | Orihime Inoue, Isane Kotetsu | | |
| 2023 | Ōoku: The Inner Chambers | Nobutsuna's Wife, Hisamichi | | |
| 2024–25 | Go! Go! Loser Ranger! | Angel Usukubo | Producer, Additional Voice Director, Casting Director | |
| 2024 | Code Geass: Rozé of the Recapture | Kaguya Sumeragi | Producer, Additional Voice Director, Casting Director | |
| 2024 | Ranma ½ | Nabiki Tendo | | |
| 2025 | Your Forma | Echika Hieda | | |

=== Animation ===
List of voice performances in animation
| Year | Title | Role | Crew Role, Notes | Source |
|---|---|---|---|---|
| 2008 | Three Delivery | Sue Yee | | |
| 2011 | Scooby-Doo! Mystery Incorporated | Mai Li | Episode: "Dragon's Secret" | Resume |
| 2011 | Family Guy | Little Girl | Episode: "Seahorse Seashell Party" | |
| 2012 | Care Bears: Welcome to Care-a-Lot | Share Bear, Baby Tugs Bear, Laugh-a-Lot Bear, Secret Bear | | |
| 2012 | DC Nation Shorts: Batman of Shanghai | Catwoman | | |
| 2013–18 | Monster High | Jinafire Long, Jane Boolittle | | |
| 2013–18 | Ever After High | Duchess Swan | | |
| 2013–14 | The Legend of Korra | Zhu Li Moon, Rohan | | |
| 2014 | Clarence | Debbie | Episode: "Clarence's Millions" | |
| 2015 | Miles from Tomorrowland | Po Po | | |
| 2015 | Be Cool, Scooby-Doo! | Bond Kuro | Episode: "Screama Donna" | |
| 2015–Present | Miraculous: Tales of Ladybug & Cat Noir | Manon Chamack | Recurring role | |
| 2015–18 | DC Super Hero Girls | Katana | | |
| 2017 | The Loud House | Beatrix, Belle, Beau Jr., Judy (Stella's Mom) | 2 episodes | |
| 2017 | We Bare Bears | Amanda, Lazer Girl | 2 episodes | |
| 2018 | Avengers Assemble | Crystal | Episode: "Mists of Attilan" | |
| 2018–20 | Ballmastrz: 9009 | Luna, Rudy Drax | | |
| 2018–20 | Barbie Dreamhouse Adventures | Renee Chao | | |
| 2019 | Beep Beep | Voom Vam | | |
| 2019 | Pinky Malinky | Jessie | Episode: "Advanced" | |
| 2019 | Pucca: Love Recipe | Granny, Panky | | |
| 2020 | Glitch Techs | Mayumi Kubota (Miko's Mom) | | |
| 2020 | Magical Girl Friendship Squad | Yolanda | Episode: "Anti Fungal Spit Skanks" | |
| 2020–24 | Lego Monkie Kid | Mei | | |
| 2021 | Star Wars: Visions | Saku | Short film: The Village Bride: English dub | |
| 2021 | High Guardian Spice | Olive | | |
| 2022 | Barbie: It Takes Two | Renee Chao | | |
| 2022 | Mermaze Mermaidz | Kishiko | | |
| 2022 | Kung Fu Panda: The Dragon Knight | Elder Huang | Episode: "The Lotus" | |
| 2023 | Big City Greens | Kiki | 2 episodes; replacing Monica Ray | |
| 2023 | The Ghost and Molly McGee | Esther Chen | | |
| 2023 | Tiny Toons Looniversity | Ling Lobster | Episode: "Prank You Very Much" | |
| 2023–24 | Barbie: A Touch of Magic | Renee Chao | | |
| 2023–24 | Royal Crackers | Rachel | Recurring role | |
| 2024 | Sonic X Shadow Generations: Dark Beginnings | Maria Robotnik | Web series | |
| 2024 | Tomb Raider: The Legend of Lara Croft | Village Elder, Biyu | Episode: "A Set of Lies Agreed Upon" | |
| 2024 | Jentry Chau vs. the Underworld | TikTok Voice, Video Voice 3, Drill Team Captain #1, Yanlou Lord 3 | Voice director | |

=== Films ===
List of voice performances in feature films
| Year | Title | Role | Notes | Source |
|---|---|---|---|---|
| 2010 | The Disappearance of Haruhi Suzumiya | Mikuru Asahina | Limited theatrical release | |
| 2015 | The Laws of the Universe Part 0 | Natsumi | Limited theatrical release | |
| 2016 | Only Yesterday | Aiko | Limited theatrical release | |
| 2017 | Sailor Moon R: The Movie | Usagi Tsukino/Sailor Moon | Limited theatrical release | |
| 2017 | Your Name. | Mitsuha Miyamizu | ADR director, casting director Limited theatrical release | |
| 2017 | Sword Art Online The Movie: Ordinal Scale | Yui | Limited theatrical release | |
| 2018 | Lu over the Wall | Yuho | | |
| 2018 | Big Fish & Begonia | Chun | Limited theatrical release | |
| 2018 | Fate/stay night: Heaven's Feel I. presage flower | Illyasviel von Einzbern | Limited theatrical release | |
| 2018 | Liz and the Blue Bird | Nozomi Kasaki, Tsubomi | ADR director, casting director Limited theatrical release | |
| 2019 | White Snake | Blanca | Limited theatrical release | |
| 2020 | Weathering with You | Mitsuha Miyamizu | ADR director Limited theatrical release | |
| 2020 | Dragon Quest: Your Story | Bianca Whitaker | Limited theatrical release | |
| 2020 | Ne Zha | Li Jung | Limited theatrical release | |
| 2022 | The Deer King | Yoki's Wife, Kazan Woman | Limited theatrical release | |
| 2022 | Inu-Oh | Inu-oh's Mother | Producer, Casting Director Limited theatrical release | |
| 2022 | Goodbye, Don Gleese! | Mako Kamogawa | Producer, Additional Voice Director, Casting Director Limited theatrical release | |
| 2022 | Mobile Suit Gundam: Cucuruz Doan's Island | Haro | Limited theatrical release | |
| 2023 | Deemo: Memorial Keys | Rosalia | Limited theatrical release | |
| 2024 | Mobile Suit Gundam SEED Freedom | Lacus Clyne | | |
| 2025 | The Colors Within | Ballet Instructor | | |
| 2026 | All You Need Is Kill | Rita | | |

List of voice performances in direct-to-video and television films
| Year | Title | Role | Notes | Source |
|---|---|---|---|---|
| 2005 | Digimon Tamers: Battle of Adventurers | Minami Uehara | | |
| 2005 | Street Fighter Alpha: Generations | Sayaka | | |
| 2012 | Fate/stay night: Unlimited Blade Works | Illyasviel von Einzbern | | |
| 2013 | K-On! The Movie | Yui Hirasawa | | |
| 2013 | Khumba | Cheerleader Zebra | | |
| 2014 | Patema Inverted | Kaho | ADR director | |
| 2015 | 009 Re:Cyborg | 001/Ivan Whisky | | |
| 2016 | Barbie: Spy Squad | Renee | | |
| 2016 | DC Super Hero Girls: Hero of the Year | Katana | | |
| 2016 | Strike Witches: The Movie | Gertrud Barkhorn | | |
| 2017 | K: Missing Kings | Neko | | |
| 2017 | DC Super Hero Girls: Intergalactic Games | Katana | | |
| 2017 | Lego DC Super Hero Girls: Brain Drain | Katana | | |
| 2018 | Lego DC Super Hero Girls: Super-Villain High | Katana | | |
| 2018 | DC Super Hero Girls: Legends of Atlantis | Katana | | |
| 2019 | Fate/stay night: Heaven's Feel II. lost butterfly | Illyasviel von Einzbern | | |
| 2021 | The Night Is Short, Walk On Girl | Princess Daruma | English Language Version Producer, Voice Director, Casting Director, ADR Script Adapter, Recording Engineer | |
| 2021 | Memories | Robot | Magnetic Rose: Producer, Casting Director, Recording Engineer, Additional Voice Directing, Script Adaptation | |
| 2021 | Trollhunters: Rise of the Titans | Additional Voices | | |
| 2021 | Fate/stay night: Heaven's Feel III. spring song | Illyasviel von Einzbern | | |
| 2024 | Pretty Guardian Sailor Moon Cosmos The Movie | Usagi Tsukino / Sailor Moon | Parts 1 and 2 | |
| 2024 | Mononoke the Movie: Phantom in the Rain | Awashima | | |

=== Video games ===
List of voice performances in video games
| Year | Title | Role | Crew Role, Notes | Source |
|---|---|---|---|---|
| 2004 | Shadow Hearts: Covenant | Princess Anastasia | | |
| 2004 | Obscure | Shannon Matthews | | |
| 2006–present | Naruto series | Hinata Hyūga, Rin Nohara | | |
| 2006–present | Castlevania series | Charlotte Aulin | | Tweet |
| 2006 | Dirge of Cerberus: Final Fantasy VII | Incidental characters | | |
| 2006 | Valkyrie Profile 2: Silmeria | Silmeria Valkyrie | | |
| 2006 | Tales of the Abyss | Natalia | | Resume |
| 2006 | Project Sylpheed | May Crichton | Credited as Stephanie Shea | In-game credits |
| 2007 | Persona 3 FES | Metis | | |
| 2007 | Eternal Sonata | Serenade | | |
| 2007 | Digimon World Data Squad | Megumi Shirakawa, Runaway C | | |
| 2007 | Resident Evil: The Umbrella Chronicles | Rebecca Chambers | | Resume |
| 2008 | Devil May Cry 4 | Kyrie | | |
| 2008 | Star Ocean: First Departure | Erys Jerand | | |
| 2009 | Terminator Salvation | Resistance Soldier | | |
| 2009 | MagnaCarta 2 | Celestine | | |
| 2009 | Tekken 6 | Julia Chang | Dialogues only | Tweet |
| 2009 | Bayonetta | | Motion capture for Cereza | Resume |
| 2010 | BioShock 2 | Mlle Blanche | | |
| 2010 | Final Fantasy XIII | Cocoon Inhabitants | | |
| 2010 | Trauma Team | Tomoe Tachibana | | |
| 2010 | Sengoku Basara: Samurai Heroes | Kasuga | | |
| 2010 | Shira Oka: Second Chances | Aya, Yui Arakawa | | |
| 2010 | Binary Domain | Additional voices | | |
| 2011 | Tekken Tag Tournament 2 | Julia Chang | Dialogues only | |
| 2011 | The Legend of Heroes: Trails in the Sky | Estelle Bright | | |
| 2012 | Ninja Gaiden 3 | Canna, Omitsu | | |
| 2013 | Anarchy Reigns | Rin Rin, Fei Rin, Ai Rin, Stela Fitzgerald | | |
| 2013 | Fire Emblem Awakening | Tharja, Kjelle | | |
| 2013 | Disney Princess Palace Pets | Petit, Treasure | | |
| 2013 | Grand Theft Auto V | The Local Population | | |
| 2013 | Armored Core: Verdict Day | Female AI, 20's Female Pilot | | |
| 2013 | Rune Factory 4 | Margaret | Also Special | |
| 2014 | Bravely Default | Airy | | Tweet |
| 2014 | Danganronpa 2: Goodbye Despair | Mikan Tsumiki | Uncredited | |
| 2014 | Ar Nosurge | Cas | | |
| 2015 | Stella Glow | Popo | | Tweet |
| 2015 | Xenoblade Chronicles X | Additional voices | | |
| 2015 | The Legend of Heroes: Trails in the Sky SC | Estelle Bright | | |
| 2016 | Seven Knights | Rachel Agni | | Facebook |
| 2016 | World of Final Fantasy | Sherlotta | | |
| 2016 | Skylanders: Imaginators | Ember | | Tweet |
| 2017 | Fire Emblem Heroes | Tharja, Beruka, Rhajat | | |
| 2017 | .hack//G.U.: Last Recode | Tabby | | |
| 2017 | The Legend of Heroes: Trails in the Sky the 3rd | Estelle Bright | Reused audio | |
| 2018 | Marvel's Spider-Man | Additional voices | | |
| 2018 | Overkill's The Walking Dead | Maya Evans | | |
| 2019 | Tekken 7 | Julia Chang | Dialogues only | |
| 2019 | Devil May Cry 5 | Kyrie | | |
| 2019 | Sekiro: Shadows Die Twice | Emma | | |
| 2019 | Crash Team Racing: Nitro Fueled | Megumi, Yaya Panda | | |
| 2019 | Indivisible | Razmi | | |
| 2019 | Arcade Spirits | Naomi | | |
| 2020 | Guardian Tales | Mei, Karina | | |
| 2020 | Little Witch Academia: VR Broom Racing | Lotte Yanson, Jasminka Antonenko | | |
| 2020 | The Legend of Heroes: Trails of Cold Steel IV | Estelle Bright | | |
| 2020 | Sakuna: Of Rice and Ruin | Kokorowa | | |
| 2020 | Yakuza: Like a Dragon | Sumire Sawa | | |
| 2021 | Cookie Run: Kingdom | Tiger Lily Cookie | | |
| 2021 | Earth Defense Force: World Brothers | Pao | | |
| 2021 | Lost Judgment | Saori Shirosaki | | |
| 2022 | Rune Factory 5 | Margaret | | |
| 2022 | Tactics Ogre: Reborn | Arycelle Dania | | |
| 2023 | Arknights | Vanilla, Savage | | |
| 2023 | The Legend of Heroes: Trails into Reverie | Estelle Bright | | |
| 2023 | Armored Core VI: Fires of Rubicon | Little Ziyi, additional voices | | |
| 2023 | Mortal Kombat 1 | Harumi Shirai | | |
| 2024 | Like a Dragon: Infinite Wealth | Additional voices | | |
| 2024 | Persona 3 Reload | Additional voices | | |
| 2024 | Barbie: Project Friendship | Renee | | |
| 2024 | Shadow Generations | Maria Robotnik | | |
| 2025 | Like a Dragon: Pirate Yakuza in Hawaii | Additional voices | | |
| 2025 | Date Everything! | Hero Hime | | |
| 2025 | Trails in the Sky 1st Chapter | Estelle Bright | | |
| 2025 | Silent Hill f | Kimie Shimizu | | |
| 2026 | Trails in the Sky 2nd Chapter | Estelle Bright | | |
| 2026 | Danganronpa 2×2 | Mikan Tsumiki | | |

| Preceded by Linda Ballantyne | Voice of Sailor Moon; 2014–present | Succeeded by None |
