= Ashley Eckstein =

American actress (born 1981)

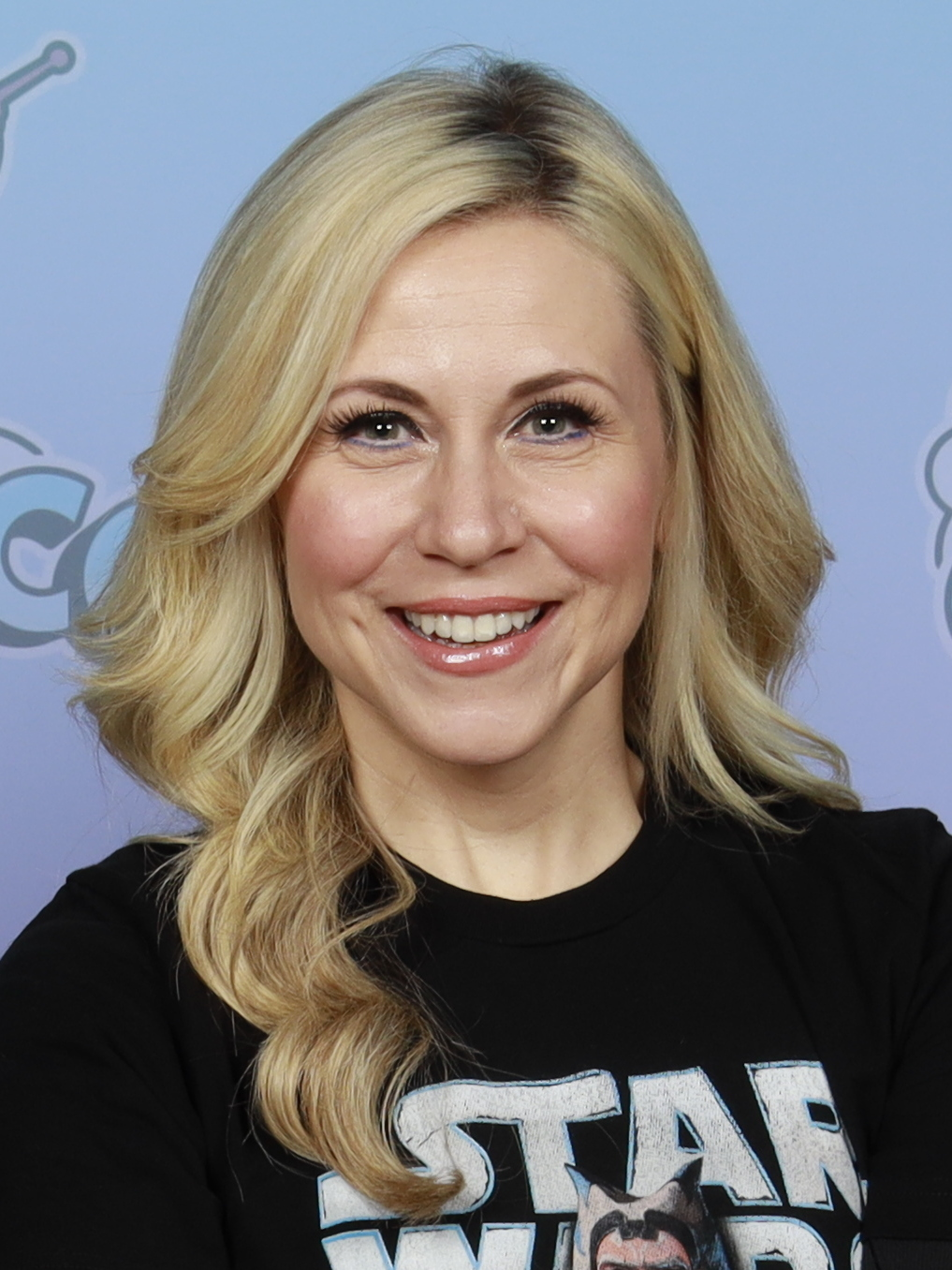
- Eckstein at GalaxyCon San Jose 2024
- Born: Ashley Drane; September 22, 1981 (age 45); Louisville, Kentucky, U.S.
- Occupations: Actress; fashion designer
- Years active: 1994–present
- Known for: Star Wars: The Clone Wars; The Brady Bunch in the White House; That's So Raven
- Spouse: David Eckstein (m. 2005)
- Relatives: Rick Eckstein (brother-in-law)
- Website: ashleyeckstein.com

Ashley Eckstein (née Drane; born September 22, 1981) is an American actress and fashion designer. She is the founder of the fashion label Her Universe. She is best known for voicing the role of Ahsoka Tano throughout the Star Wars franchise, beginning with Star Wars: The Clone Wars in 2008 as well as her recurring role as Muffy on That's So Raven.

== Early life ==
Eckstein was born on September 22, 1981, in Louisville, Kentucky. She was raised in Orlando, Florida, where her first job was as a cast member at Disney-MGM Studios. As a child she appeared in Nickelodeon GUTS.

== Career ==
Eckstein began as a child actress under her birth name, Ashley Drane. At age 12, she played disability advocate Helen Keller in a community-theater production of The Miracle Worker. Following more stage, as well as television and commercial work in Orlando, she moved to Los Angeles, where she played Lisa Rossbach, Admiral Chegwidden's goddaughter, on the military-justice drama series JAG. In 2002, she played Jan Brady, essaying the role in the television film The Brady Bunch in the White House. She played the recurring role of Muffy Roberts on the Disney Channel sitcom That's So Raven. She also played small roles as Alicia in the film Sydney White and Ms. Cole in the film Alice Upside Down (both 2007).

Most prominently, Eckstein voiced Ahsoka Tano in the Star Wars television series Star Wars: The Clone Wars, Star Wars Rebels, and Star Wars Forces of Destiny. Eckstein reprised her role as Ahsoka with a short voice cameo in Star Wars: The Rise of Skywalker.

In 2010, Eckstein started Her Universe, a fashion brand of science-fiction-themed clothing targeted at girls and women. In 2012, Disney began selling Her Universe products at Disneyland and Disney World.

Eckstein has joined UNICEF Kid Power, along with Aly Raisman and David Ortiz, as a brand ambassador Kid Power Champion.

Eckstein and E. K. Johnston co-wrote the short story "By Whatever Sun", which appeared in the 2017 Star Wars book From a Certain Point of View. On November 29, 2023, she was the guest narrator at Disney's Candlelight Processional at Walt Disney World.

== Personal life ==
She married former Major League Baseball player David Eckstein on November 26, 2005, in his hometown of Sanford, Florida, followed by a reception at Walt Disney World.

== Filmography ==
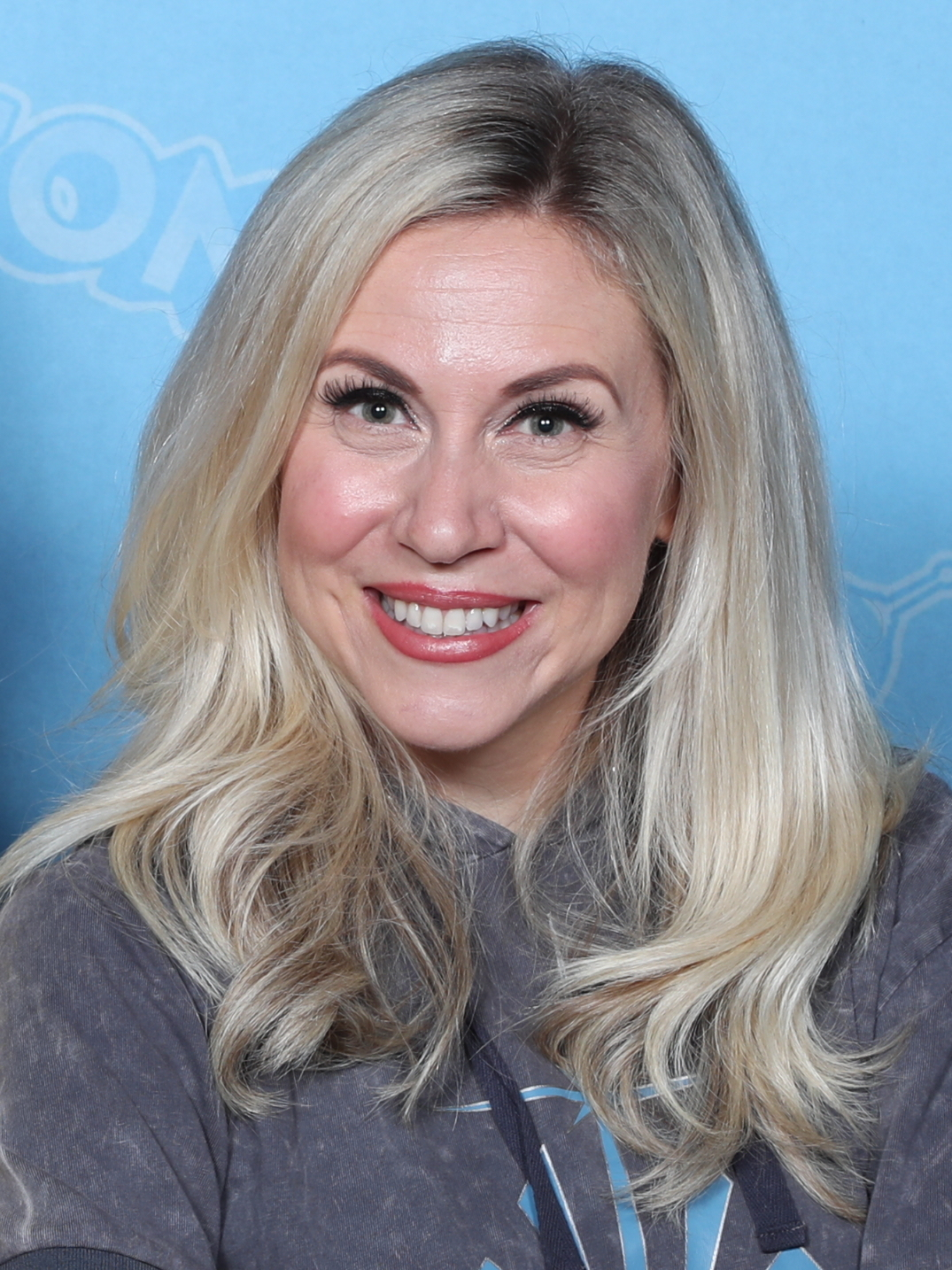
Eckstein at the 2021 GalaxyCon Raleigh

=== Film ===
List of performances in film
Year	Title	Role	Notes	Source
2003	Prey for Rock & Roll	Punk Rock Girl		
2003	Ancient Warriors	Dylan Paccione		
2007	Alice Upside Down	Miss Cole		
2007	Sydney White	Alicia		
2008	Star Wars: The Clone Wars	Ahsoka Tano (voice)		
2016	Only Yesterday	Yaeko Okajima (voice)	English dub	
2016	DC Super Hero Girls: Hero of the Year	Cheetah (voice)	Direct-to-video	
2018	Lego DC Super Hero Girls: Super-Villain High	Cheetah (voice)		
2019	Star Wars: The Rise of Skywalker	Ahsoka Tano (voice)		

=== Television ===
List of performances in television
Year	Series	Role	Notes	Source
1994	Nickelodeon Guts	Herself	Known as Ashley "The Face" Drane	
2001	JAG	Lisa Rossbach	Episode: "Measure of Men"	
2002	The Rerun Show		Series regular Episode: "Diff'rent Strokes: The Rivals/The Partridge Family: Keith and Lauriebelle"	
2002	The Brady Bunch in the White House	Jan Brady		
2003–06	That's So Raven	Muffy		
2003	That '70s Show	Julie	Episode: "Christmas"	
2004	Drake & Josh	Susan	Episode: "Believe Me, Brother"	
2004	Strong Medicine	Becca	Episode: "Positive Results"	
2004	Blue Collar TV	Various	Series regular	
2005	Hot Properties	Nancy	Episode: "Killer Bodies"	
2006	Phil of the Future	Grace	Episode: "Stuck in the Meddle with You"	
2008	The Replacements	Bailey (voice)	Episode: "Glee by the Sea"	
2008–14, 2020	Star Wars: The Clone Wars	Ahsoka Tano (voice)		
2012	Sofia the First: Once Upon a Princess	Mia the Bluebird (voice)	Television film	
2013–18	Sofia the First	Mia the Bluebird (voice)		
2013	Robot Chicken	Energizer Bunny's Wife, Girl (voice)	Episode: "Caffeine-Induced Aneurysm"	
2014–17	Ultimate Spider-Man	Dagger, Shriek (voice)	6 episodes	
2014–16; 2018	Star Wars Rebels	Ahsoka Tano (voice)		
2015–2018	DC Super Hero Girls	Cheetah (voice)	15 episodes	
2017–18	Star Wars Forces of Destiny	Ahsoka Tano (voice)		
2019	Avengers Assemble	Lady Elanna (voice)	3 episodes	
2020	She-Ra and the Princesses of Power	Tallstar (voice)	Episode: "Stranded"	
2022	Star Wars: Tales of the Jedi	Ahsoka Tano (voice)	2 episodes	
2025	Lego Star Wars: Rebuild the Galaxy: Pieces of the Past	Ahsoka Tano (Voice)	3 episodes	

=== Video games ===
List of voice performances in video games
Year	Title	Role	Notes	Source
2008	Star Wars: The Clone Wars – Lightsaber Duels	Ahsoka Tano		
2009	Star Wars: The Clone Wars – Republic Heroes	Ahsoka Tano		
2011	Lego Star Wars III: The Clone Wars	Ahsoka Tano		
2015	Disney Infinity 3.0	Ahsoka Tano		

== Audiobooks ==
- 2016: E. K. Johnston: Star Wars: Ahsoka
