= Romi Dames =

Japanese and American actress (born 1979)

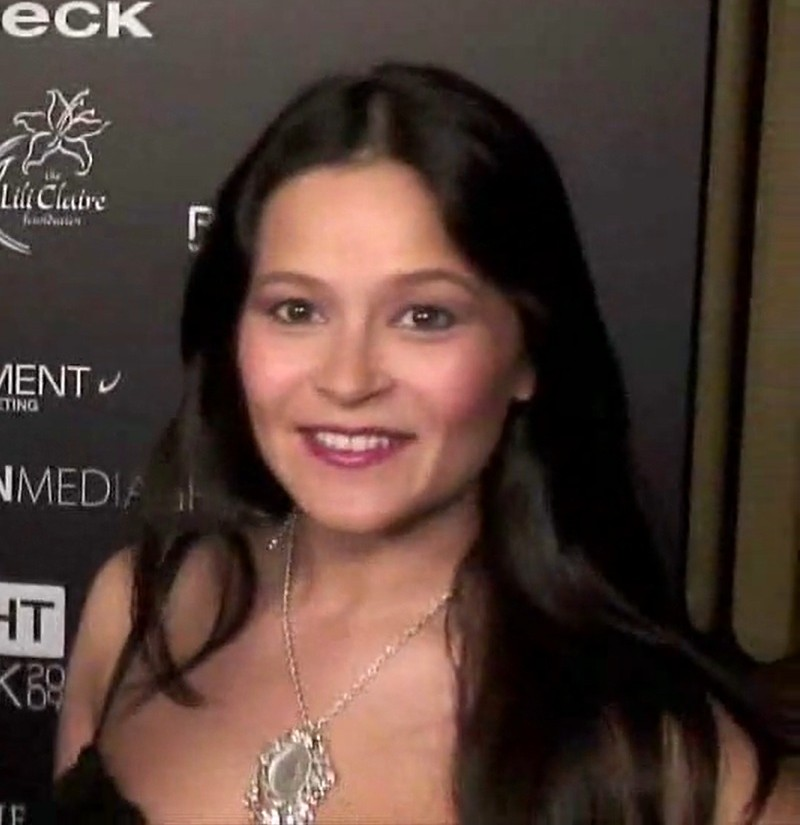
- Dames in 2009
- Born: Hiromi Dames; November 5, 1979 (age 47); Camp Zama, Japan
- Citizenship: United States
- Education: University of Washington (BFA)
- Occupation: Actress
- Years active: 1993–present

Hiromi Dames (ヒロミ・デイムズ, Deimuzu Hiromi; born November 5, 1979), known professionally as Romi Dames, is a Japanese-born American actress. Born in Camp Zama, Kanagawa, Dames immigrated with her family to Washington when she was 13 years old. She attended the University of Washington and began pursuing her television career. She began her acting career on television shows such as Bill Nye the Science Guy and a few other appearances. Her first recurring role was on the show Sci-Squad. She was then cast in the television series Hannah Montana, in which she played the role of Traci Van Horn.

== Biography ==
Born to a Japanese mother and Jewish American father, Dames lived in Japan until she turned 13; soon after, her father retired and moved the family to Seattle, Washington. After finishing high school in Seattle, Dames was accepted to the University of Washington. She is best known for her role as Traci Van Horn, the nasal-voiced celebrity on Hannah Montana and the voice of Musa in Winx Club. Other credits include recurring roles on The Young and the Restless, Bill Nye the Science Guy and Sci-Squad.

Dames served as a Star Power Ambassador for Starlight Children's Foundation, encouraging other young people to commit their time, energy and resources to help other children and working with Starlight for the benefit of seriously ill children.

== Filmography ==
Year	Title	Role	Notes
1993	Bill Nye the Science Guy	Herself	TV series
1999	Sci-Squad	Erica	TV series
2001	Celebrity Deathmatch	Lisa Ling	TV show
2005	Rule Number One	Student Interviewee	Film
2005	Call Center	Fred's Girl	Film
2006–09	Hannah Montana	Traci van Horn	13 episodes
2007	The Young and the Restless	Morgue Attendant	TV series
2009–10	Phineas and Ferb	Additional Voices	TV series
2010	The Newlywed Game	Herself	TV series
2010	Kick Buttowski: Suburban Daredevil	Additional Voices	TV series
2010	Child P.O.W.	Starring Nina	Movie
2011–14	Winx Club	Musa, Cherie	TV series (Nickelodeon re-records of seasons 3–4, original records of specials and seasons 5–6)
2012	Winx Club: The Secret of the Lost Kingdom	Musa	Movie (voice in Nickelodeon version)
2013	Winx Club 3D: Magical Adventure	Musa	Movie (voice in Nickelodeon version)
2013	Bravoman: Super-Unequaled Hero of Excellence	Waya Hime, Wonder Momo, Additional Voices	Web-series
2015	Fresh Beat Band of Spies	Kitty Boo-Boo, Kitty Mittens	TV series
2015	Star Darlings	Vivica	Web-series
2016	Pickle and Peanut	Jumpkick, Kenihana Girl, Additional Voices	TV series
2017–18	DC Super Hero Girls	Lena Luthor	Web-series
2017	Milo Murphy's Law	Charlene & Sharon Burlee	TV series
2018, 2021	The Loud House	Jackie	2 episodes
2018	Lego DC Super Hero Girls: Super-Villain High	Lena Luthor, Divide	Movie
2019	We Bare Bears	Kazumi	TV series
2019	Mickey Mouse Mixed-Up Adventures	Himari Tanaka	TV series
2020	Amphibia	Pearl	TV series
2021	Monsters at Work	Lisa, Josephina, Kurtz, Additional monsters	TV series
2021	Star Wars: Visions	Ochō (English language dub)	TV series; Episode: "Lop and Ochō"
2021	Curious George: Cape Ahoy	Emma	Direct-to-Streaming
2022	Rugrats	Kira Watanabe	TV series; Episode: "Lucky Smudge"
2022–25	Hamster & Gretel	Hiromi Tanaka	TV series
