= Teala Dunn =

American actress

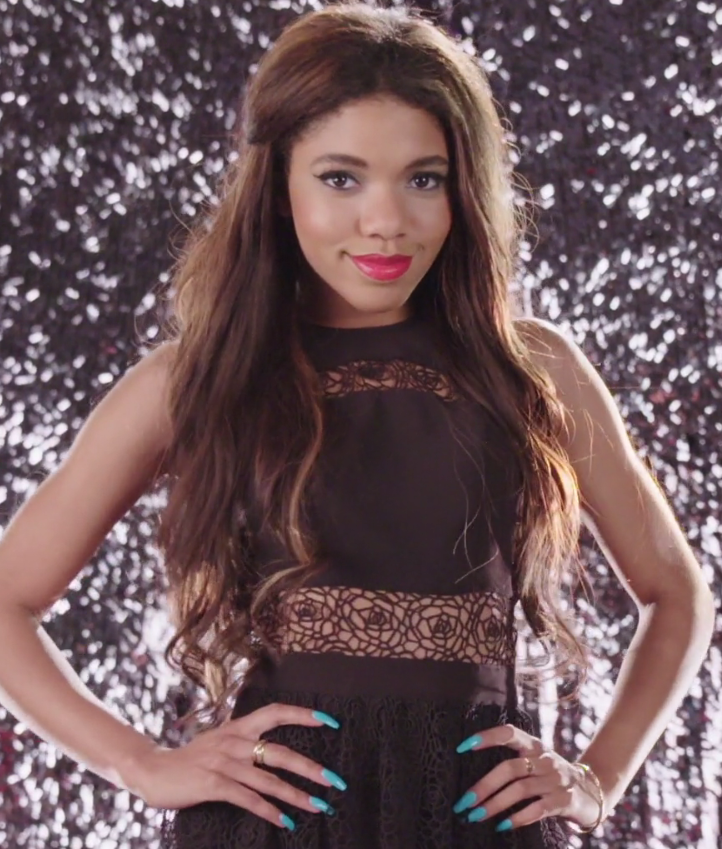
- Dunn in a CoverGirl campaign by MTV in 2016
- Born: December 8, 1996 (age 29)
- Occupations: Actress; YouTuber
- Years active: 2002–present

YouTube information
- Channels: Teala; TTLYTEALA
- Subscribers: 2.78 million (combined)
- Views: 278 million (combined)
- Last updated: April 28, 2026

Teala Dunn (born December 8, 1996) is an American actress and YouTuber. She is best known for voicing Tuck on Wonder Pets!. She also played Lindsey Persons in the TBS sitcom Are We There Yet?.

== Career ==
Teala Dunn is known for her role as a YouTube vlogger, and she is also known for her recurring role as Juanita on the Nickelodeon television show The Naked Brothers Band, Kelsey on The Thundermans, and as the voice of the turtle Tuck in Wonder Pets!.

Dunn made a guest appearance in Law & Order: Special Victims Unit. In film, she was seen in Phoebe in Wonderland, which premiered at the Sundance Film Festival in 2008. She also appeared with Felicity Huffman in Transamerica, and was also heard as a bunny in Disney's Enchanted. Dunn appeared on Shake It Up as Dina's childhood nemesis, and also appeared on Enlisted as Donald Cody's teenage daughter.

Dunn began voicing the superhero Bumblebee in the animated series DC Super Hero Girls in 2015. She has continued to voice the character in subsequent films, including DC Super Hero Girls: Intergalactic Games, Lego DC Super Hero Girls: Brain Drain, Lego DC Super Hero Girls: Super-Villain High, and DC Super Hero Girls: Legends of Atlantis.

In 2017, Dunn starred in the AT&T Hello Lab drama series Guilty Party. The following year, she collaborated with Eva Marie's NEM Fashion brand to launch a limited edition line of sunglasses. In 2020, she joined the content creator collective Clubhouse BH. Dunn later began hosting the Spotify Original podcast Adulting with Teala & Nia.

Dunn appeared as Zelda in the Freeform series Good Trouble. In 2022, she hosted the Brat TV podcast Anonymously Yours. She appeared in the Hulu romantic comedy Crush, which premiered that same year. She appeared in the musical film Rockbottom in 2024, and the horror film Werewolf Game in 2025. Dunn also launched a beauty brand titled Creme de la Cube. She is set to appear in the Tom Arnold's directorial debut The Breakup Pill, a high-concept romantic comedy.

== Personal life ==
Dunn lives in Los Angeles. She has an older sister.

== Filmography ==
=== Film ===
Year	Title	Role	Notes
2005	Transamerica	Little Girl	
2007	Enchanted	Bunny (voice)	
2008	Phoebe in Wonderland	Jenny	
2014	Expelled	Emily	
2015	Below	Jess	Short film
2016	The Cleansing Hour	Rachel	Short film
2017	School Spirits	Morgan Walker	
2017	DC Super Hero Girls: Intergalactic Games	Bumblebee, Artemiz (voice)	Direct-to-video
2017	Lego DC Super Hero Girls: Brain Drain	Bumblebee (voice)	Direct-to-video
2018	Lego DC Super Hero Girls: Super-Villain High	Bumblebee (voice)	Direct-to-video
2018	DC Super Hero Girls: Legends of Atlantis	Bumblebee (voice)	Direct-to-video
2022	Crush	Stacey Clark	
2024	Rockbottom	Kat	
2024	Spooky Society	Breezy	Short film
2025	Werewolf Game	Pepper	
TBA	Action #1	Mischa	
TBA	The Breakup Pill	Penelope	Post-Production

=== Television ===
Year	Title	Role	Notes
2002	Law & Order: Special Victims Unit	Nina	Episode: "Dolls"
2006–2016	Wonder Pets!	Tuck (voice)	Main role (62 episodes)
2007	Queens Supreme	Cherise	Episode: "That Voodoo That You Do"
2007–2008	The Naked Brothers Band	Juanita	Recurring role (8 episodes)
2010–2012	Are We There Yet?	Lindsey Kingston-Persons	Main role (83 episodes)
2012	Shake It Up	Gina	Episode: "Parent Trap It Up"
2012	Teens Wanna Know	Guest	2 episodes
2013	The Crazy Ones	Taylor	Episode: "Bad Dad"
2013–2014	Dog with a Blog	Dab	2 episodes
2014	Enlisted	Britnay Cody	3 episodes
2014–2015	The Thundermans	Kelsey	4 episodes
2015–2018	DC Super Hero Girls	Bumblebee, Artemiz (voice)	Main role (52 episodes)
2017	Me and My Grandma	Band Tween #2	Episode: "The Stupid and Boring Store"
2017–2018	Guilty Party	Tatiana / Naia Santos	17 episodes
2018	All Night	Alexis	Main role
2018	Escape the Night	Herself as "The Super Spy"	4 episodes
2018	Spider-Man	Panda-Mania (voice)	Episode: "Bring on the Bad Guys"
2019	Liza on Demand	Jaryn	Episode: "New Year's Eve: Part 2"
2019	Get Shorty	Teala	Episode: "What Else Did God Say?"
2021–2022	Good Trouble	Zelda	4 Episodes

=== Podcast ===
Year	Title	Role
2021–2022	Adulting with Teala & Nia	Host
2022	Anonymously Yours	Host
2024–2025	Moonburn	Olivia

=== Video games ===
Year	Title	Role	Notes
2008	The Wonder Pets!: Save the Puppy!	Tuck	
2008	The Wonder Pets!: Save the Animals!	Tuck	
2009	The Wonder Pets!: Join the Circus	Tuck	
