= Crazy Quilt =

- The first appearance of Crazy-Quilt, as depicted on the cover of Boy Commandos #15 (May 1946); art by Jack Kirby.

Publication information
- Publisher: DC Comics
- First appearance: (Mr. Quilt): Boy Commandos #15; (Dekker I): Blackhawk #180; (Dekker II): Detective Comics #566; (Female version): Villains United #2
- Created by: (Mr. Quilt): Jack Kirby; (Dekker I): Dick Dillin and unknown writer; (Dekker II): Doug Moench and Gene Colan; (Female version): Gail Simone and Dale Eaglesham

In-story information
- Alter ego: Mr. Quilt; Paul Dekker I Paul Dekker II; Unidentified female
- Species: Human
- Abilities: Color manipulation, energy projection, and hypnosis via helmet; Technological aptitude

Crazy-Quilt is the name of several characters in DC Comics. The first version, Mr. Quilt, is an enemy of the Boy Commandos and later Robin. The second version, Paul Dekker, is an enemy of the Blackhawks. The third version, also named Paul Dekker, is an enemy of the Post-Crisis Batman and Robin. The fourth version is an unnamed female who was a member of Alexander Luthor Jr.'s Secret Society. The first and third are blind and use special helmets that enable them to regain their vision and generate rainbow energy beams. Crazy Quilt also appears in Batman: The Brave and the Bold, voiced by Jeffrey Tambor, and the DC Super Hero Girls franchise, voiced by Tom Kenny.

== Publication history ==
Mr. Quilt, the original Crazy-Quilt, first appeared in Boy Commandos #15 (May-June 1946) and was created by Joe Simon and Jack Kirby. He first encountered Robin in Star Spangled Comics #123 (December 1951).

The first Paul Dekker incarnation of Crazy Quilt appeared in Blackhawk #180 (January 1963) and was created by artist Dick Dillin and an uncredited writer.

The Post-Crisis version of the original Crazy Quilt was first seen in Detective Comics #566 (September 1986) by Doug Moench and Gene Colan. At first, his real name was not mentioned, but in Batman: The Widening Gyre #4 (February 2010) he was given the name Paul Dekker rather than Mr. Quilt.

The unidentified female version of Crazy Quilt first appeared in Villains United #2 (August 2005) and was created by Gail Simone and Dale Eaglesham.

== Fictional character biography ==
=== Mr. Quilt ===
Crazy-Quilt was originally a painter named Quilt who leads a double-life as a master criminal. He gives the plans for his crimes to various henchmen through clues left in his paintings. However, he is blinded by a gunshot wound after one of his henchmen betrays him. Quilt volunteers for an experimental procedure to restore his vision, but is left unable to see anything but bright colors. In his second published appearance, he regains his vision using a special light-emitting helmet. After five published encounters with the Boy Commandos, Crazy-Quilt faces Robin for the first time.

In Earth-One continuity, Crazy-Quilt's history is identical to the Golden Age version. Crazy-Quilt's sight is restored briefly after he kidnaps a surgeon to assist him. Batman and Robin intervene, during which Crazy-Quilt is blinded again after Robin reflects his light beams at him. Obsessing over his young adversary, he becomes one of the few bat-villains to hate Robin more than his mentor.

Attempting to enact revenge upon Robin, Crazy-Quilt mistakenly takes out his aggression on Jason Todd, nearly killing him. He later fights Jason again after knocking Batman unconscious.

=== Paul Dekker I ===
In a 1962 issue of Blackhawk, a fence named Paul Dekker uses the name Crazy Quilt, but the titular heroes capture him.

=== Paul Dekker II ===
A new version of Paul Dekker is introduced as a prisoner who escapes when Ra's al Ghul causes a mass prison break at Arkham Asylum and Blackgate Penitentiary. He later joins the Secret Society of Super Villains, with he and dozens of villains gathering in response to the JLA's new moon base and extended team efforts. The meeting turns out to be a JLA trap and all the villains are captured.

Crazy Quilt appears in the Belle Reve riot in JLA #34, lugging around the eviscerated body of the prison warden. The prisoners, along with much of humanity, were being affected by Mageddon and Hector Hammond.

In The New 52 continuity reboot, Paul Dekker is an insane ex-Wayne Enterprises geneticist and ally of Doctor Death and Hugo Strange. He is later killed after injecting himself with an experimental formula, causing his body to decay.

=== Female Crazy Quilt ===
An unnamed, female version of Crazy Quilt appears as a member of Alexander Luthor Jr.'s version of the Secret Society. She works with many other supervillains to take down the Secret Six. In Outsiders #50, she is captured by the Suicide Squad.

In the Secret Six series, she is one of the villains who accepts the offer of a bounty on the Secret Six from mysterious crime boss Junior, only to be gravely wounded. She later appears in James Robinson's Justice League: Cry For Justice miniseries as one of the many villains who attack the team.

== Skills and equipment ==
Crazy Quilt has a helmet that allows him to hypnotize his victims using colorful flashing lights. It can project lethal laser beams and function as artificial eyes. All versions possess an expertise in gadgetry.

== In other media ==
=== Television ===
The Paul Dekker incarnation of Crazy Quilt appears in Batman: The Brave and the Bold, voiced by Jeffrey Tambor.

=== Film ===
Crazy Quilt makes a non-speaking cameo appearance in The Lego Batman Movie.

=== Video games ===
The Paul Dekker incarnation of Crazy Quilt appears as a character summon in Scribblenauts Unmasked: A DC Comics Adventure.

=== Miscellaneous ===
- The Paul Dekker incarnation of Crazy Quilt appears in DC Super Hero Girls and its tie-in films, voiced by Tom Kenny. This version is a teacher at Super Hero High.
- Crazy Quilt appears in Justice League Adventures #6.

== See also ==
- List of Batman family enemies
