= Lena Luthor =

Fictional character in DC Comics

- Lena Luthor taken from Justice League #35 (October 2014). Art by Doug Mahnke.

Publication information
- Publisher: DC Comics
- First appearance: Superman's Girl Friend, Lois Lane #23 (February 1961)
- Created by: Jerry Siegel (script); Kurt Schaffenberger (art)

In-story information
- Notable aliases: Lena Thorul; Ultrawomen
- Abilities: ESP

Lena Luthor is the name of two fictional comic book characters in DC Comics. The first one, introduced in 1961, is the sister of Superman's nemesis Lex Luthor, while the second one, introduced in 2000, is Luthor's daughter, named after her aunt.

On live-action television, the original Lena Luthor was portrayed by Denise Gossett in a 1991 episode of Superboy, Cassidy Freeman in three seasons (2008–2011) of Smallville, and by Katie McGrath in five seasons (2016–2021) of Supergirl.

== Publication history ==
Lena Luthor first appeared in Superman's Girl Friend, Lois Lane #23 and was created by Jerry Siegel and Kurt Schaffenberger.

== Fictional character biography ==
=== Lena Luthor I ===
In Silver Age continuity, Lena is Lex Luthor's younger sister. After Lex began his villainous career, his family changed their last name in shame to the anagram Thorul and told Lena that Lex had been killed in a mountain-climbing accident. Soon after this, they were killed in an auto accident. As a result, Lena never knew she had an older brother, as Lex Luthor himself (with occasional help from Supergirl and Superman) worked to keep her from learning the truth. Lena appeared irregularly in DC Comics from 1961 to 1975. Lena had psychic/empathic abilities, gained from touching a Space Brain that Luthor was experimenting on before he became a villain. In 1981, Lena lost her powers after brain surgery, and the decision was made to tell her the truth about Luthor. After the initial shock, there were signs of reconciliation after Luthor discovered he had unwittingly aided another criminal's conspiracy against Lena, and he was deeply apologetic.

In Final Crisis: Legion of 3 Worlds #3, Legionnaires Polar Boy, Wildfire, and Dawnstar travel to Smallville during the 20th century, when Superman was still a suburban legend. The three heroes arrive to the Luthor household, where they hear a young Lex arguing with his father about his mother and sister.

In the pages of Superman: Secret Origin (2009), Lena Luthor cared about Lex even when he ran away after their mother died when she was young and their father died of a heart attack.

In the 2009 revival of Adventure Comics, Lex covers up his Smallville history, which includes disavowing a connection to his sister. Lena is now paralyzed, living in Smallville with her daughter Lori Luthor. Lori becomes friends with Superboy, who is attracted to Lori's petty crimes when trying to take care of her mother. Both are shocked to find Lex Luthor on Lori's doorstep, intent on taking control of Superboy again and claiming he can cure Lena's condition. With Superboy's help, Luthor cures Lena, but he reverses it, claiming he only helped her to prove to Superboy that he could. He says that so long as Superman lives, he will never reveal how he did it. Lena is put under the care of Wayne Enterprises doctors.

In 2011, "The New 52" rebooted the DC universe. Lena Luthor is paralyzed as a result of a childhood illness. Luthor initially claims to Bizarro that he never tried to save her because he was afraid of failure but admits privately later that his failed attempt left her paralyzed. He eventually treats her paralysis but delays the treatment as it involves technology he did not invent himself, leaving Lena enraged that he expected her to be forever under his shadow.

In 2016, DC Comics relaunched its books with "DC Rebirth", which restored its continuity to a form much as it was prior to "The New 52". Lex desperately tries to use Doctor Omen's Super-Man technology to cure Lena. It worsens her paralysis, improves her intellect, and develops a psychic link to her Mother Box. Lex is unaware that Lena created several binary clones of herself and Superwoman of Earth-Three, one of whom becomes Bizarress. Lena later uses the Mother Box's power to merge with one of Lex Luthor's exo-armors to gain mobility. The Lana Lang version of Superwoman defeats Lena and returns her to LexCorp. Lex locks up Lena as he vows to find a way to help his sister.

=== Lena Luthor II ===
Lena Luthor II, taken from Superman #7 (October 2023). Art by Dan Jurgens.

After Crisis on Infinite Earths, Lena Luthor is the daughter of Lex Luthor and Contessa Erica Del Portenza. She is named after Lex's foster sister of the same name, who was killed by their foster father, Casey Griggs. After Lena's birth, Lex takes advantage of Contessa Erica's wish to be unconscious at childbirth by keeping her permanently drugged and unconscious at his corporate headquarters, not wishing to share his daughter's love with anyone else.

When Brainiac 13 arrives from the 64th century, the modern Brainiac possesses the infant Lena to escape being deleted by his future self. Even after Brainiac leaves Lena's body, Luthor trades her to Brainiac 13 for control of the future technology that has transformed Metropolis.

Lena returns to visit Lex Luthor during the Our Worlds at War event, where she has apparently been aged to adolescence by Brainiac 13. Lena plays a sneaky role during the event, helping Luthor and his allies defeat Imperiex by feeding her father information, while secretly manipulating events to benefit Brainiac 13. She is ultimately convinced at the end to side with her father. At the end of the crossover, Brainiac 13 and Imperiex are both destroyed, and Lena is regressed to infanthood and returned to her father by Superman, who tells Luthor that he now has a second chance to try to be a man instead of a god.

In the Superman's Metropolis miniseries, the artificial intelligence controlling the B-13 technology believes itself to be Lena Luthor. When it creates a human body (female, but bald) to pursue a romantic relationship with Jimmy Olsen, Superman confronts her with the real Lena Luthor, making her realize her personality is a computer simulation of Lena's.

== Other versions ==
=== Supergirl: Cosmic Adventures in the Eighth Grade ===
An alternate universe version of Lena Thorul appears in Supergirl: Cosmic Adventures in the Eighth Grade. This version is Lex Luthor's xenophobic thirteen-year-old sister, student of a boarding school, and classmate of Supergirl who despises superheroes and blames Supergirl for getting Lex captured. Nonetheless, she unknowingly befriends Supergirl in her secret identity as Linda Lee. Throughout the series, Lena secretly works with Lex to help him seek revenge against Superman until she learns Supergirl's identity. In retaliation, she brainwashes half of the school until Supergirl's fight with Mister Mxyzptlk causes Lena to question her hatred. After being injured during the fight, Supergirl forces Lex and Superman to save her. While recovering in the hospital, Lena re-focuses her hatred towards Lex.

=== Earth-9 ===
An alternate universe version of Lena Thorul from Earth-9 appears in Tangent Comics: Wonder Woman #1 (September 1998). This version was an Element Girl scientist who saw the inevitable futility of the gender war between the Element Girl and Beast Boy Gothamites; feeling that both sides had lost touch with each other and their true potential and that they are stronger together. Seeking to create a symbol of what the Gothamites could be if they united, she uses outlawed technology to create a unique and powerful female Gothamite with attributes from the Element Girls and Beast Boys that she named Wanda. However, both sides saw Wanda as an abomination and killed Lena for creating her.

== In other media ==
=== Television ===
==== Live-action ====
Cassidy Freeman as Tess Mercer (Lutessa Lena Luthor) in Smallville.

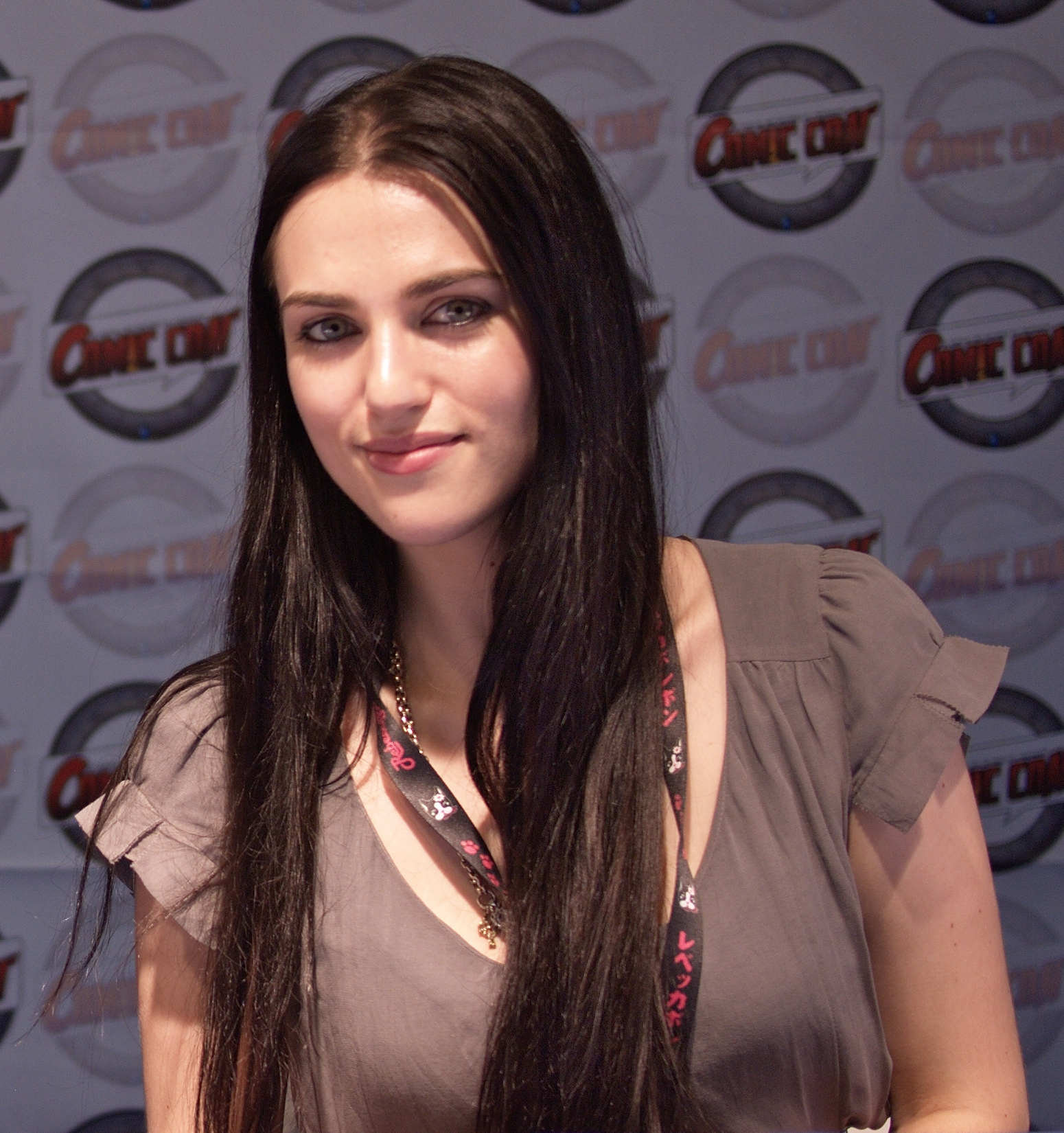
Katie McGrath at Comic Con France 2010.

- Lena Luthor I appears in the Superboy episode "Know Thine Enemy", portrayed by Denise Gossett as a young adult and by Jennifer Hawkins as a child. This version faked her death to start a new life after Lex Luthor killed their parents.
- A character based on Lena Luthor I, among other characters, named Theresa "Tess" Mercer, born Lutessa Lena Luthor, appears in Smallville, portrayed by Cassidy Freeman as a young adult and by Leigh Bourke as a child. She is Lex Luthor's illegitimate half-sister from an affair between their father Lionel Luthor and Lex's nanny Pamela Jenkins. After being left at Granny Goodness's orphanage, she had her memories suppressed and was eventually adopted by the Mercer family in Louisiana. In the present, Tess becomes Lex's protégé and later the acting CEO of LuthorCorp following his disappearance. In the series finale, Tess is mortally wounded by Lex, but erases his memories with a neurotoxin before dying.
- Lena Luthor I appears in Supergirl, portrayed by Katie McGrath as an adult and by Lucy Loken as a teenager. This version is Lex Luthor's paternal half-sister through an affair that Lionel Luthor had with a witch named Elizabeth Walsh (also portrayed by McGrath). After Lex is imprisoned, Lena becomes the CEO of LuthorCorp, moves to National City, and rebrands the company as "L-Corp" to distance it from Lex.
  - Additionally, McGrath portrays several alternate universe versions of Lena, such as one who underwent the "Metallo Procedure" and conquered National City, in the episode "It's a Super Life".
- A character based on Lena Luthor II named Elizabeth Luthor appears in the fourth season of Superman & Lois, portrayed by Elizabeth Henstridge as an adult and by Ella Wejr as a teenager. This version is the estranged daughter of Lex and Erica Luthor who broke ties with him after he was framed by Bruno and Peia Mannheim for the murder of Antony Moxie. By the present, she moved from England to France, and is also pregnant.

==== Animation ====
- Lena Luthor II appears in Robot Chicken DC Comics Special 2: Villains in Paradise, voiced by Sarah Hyland. This version is an intern of the Legion of Doom who is in a relationship with Superboy.
- Lena Luthor I appears in DC Super Hero Girls (2015), voiced by Romi Dames. This version is the leader of the Legion of Doom who became a supervillain after being rejected from Super Hero High.
- Lutessa Lena Luthor I appears in the DC Super Hero Girls (2019) episode "#SweetJustice", voiced by Cassandra Lee Morris.
- Lena Luthor I appears in the fifth season of Harley Quinn, voiced by Aisha Tyler.

=== Video games ===
Lena Luthor appears in DC Super Hero Girls: Teen Power, voiced again by Cassandra Lee Morris.

=== Miscellaneous ===
Tess Mercer appears in Smallville Season 11, in which Lex discovers her consciousness residing in his body before it is eventually transferred to an aerokinetic android body. Taking the name Red Tornado, she later joins the Justice League and begins dating Emil Hamilton.
