= Bumblebee (DC Comics) =

- Bumblebee as depicted in The Other History of the DC Universe #2 (January 2021). Art by Giuseppe Camuncoli (pencils), Andrea Cucchi (inks), and Jose Vallarrubia (colors).

Publication information
- Publisher: DC Comics
- First appearance: As Karen Beecher: Teen Titans #45 (December 1976); As Bumblebee: Teen Titans #48 (June 1977)
- Created by: Karen Beecher: Bob Rozakis; Irv Novick; Bumblebee: Bob Rozakis; José Delbo

In-story information
- Alter ego: Karen Beecher-Duncan
- Species: Human or metahuman (depending on the continuity)
- Team affiliations: Teen Titans; Doom Patrol; Justice League
- Partnerships: Lilith Clay; Dick Grayson; Roy Harper; Cyborg; Garth; Wally West; Donna Troy
- Abilities: Genius-level intellect; Shrinking to insect-like size; Her solar-powered suit enables her to fly (via bee-like wings), fire sonic force blasts, and unleash electrical 'stings'.

Bumblebee (Karen Beecher-Duncan) is a superheroine appearing in American comic books published by DC Comics and other related media, commonly as a member of the Teen Titans. She first appeared as Karen in December 1976's Teen Titans #45, and adopted the Bumblebee identity three issues later. Historically, Bumblebee is sometimes considered DC Comics' first Black woman superhero character, though this distinction is also accorded to Nubia, a less traditional costumed crimefighter than Bumblebee, who debuted three years earlier in 1973. Bumblebee is, however, DC's first African-American female superhero.

Bumblebee has been substantially adapted into media outside comics, primarily in association with the Teen Titans. T'Keyah Crystal Keymáh, Ozioma Akagha, Masasa Moyo, Kimberly Brooks, and Teala Dunn have voiced the character in animated television series and films.

== Publication history ==
Karen Beecher first appeared in Teen Titans #45 and was created by writer Bob Rozakis and artist Irv Novick. Her Bumblebee alias first appeared in Teen Titans #48.

== Fictional character biography ==
=== Teen Titans ===
Karen Beecher is a scientist and the girlfriend of Teen Titans member Mal Duncan, also known as Herald. Karen secretly builds a bumblebee-themed supersuit and attacks the Teen Titans in an attempt to bolster Mal's reputation. She escapes without her true identity being revealed.

When Karen explains her actions to the Titans, they are impressed and allow her into the team. After the Titans disband, Karen and Mal marry and retire from heroics, with the former being employed at S.T.A.R. Labs. The two briefly join Titans West, which soon disbands.

=== Infinite Crisis and One Year Later ===
Bumblebee's current Doom Patrol costume, art by Matthew Clark.

Bumblebee and her husband are among the heroes recruited by Donna Troy to help avert a crisis that threatened the existence of the universe. After a battle in space, most of the heroes are trapped by a Zeta Beam that Adam Strange intended to use for teleport the heroes away from a rift in space. The combined effects of the rift and the Zeta Beam shrinks Bumblebee to six inches tall. Bumblebee joins the Doom Patrol alongside Mal Duncan along with her husband (now known as Vox) and Beast Boy. She takes medicine developed by Doom Patrol leader Niles Caulder to sustain her shrunken body and prevent her from going into cardiac arrest.

=== DC Rebirth ===
In the DC Rebirth continuity, Karen Beecher is the pregnant wife of Mal Duncan. Following a battle with Mister Twister, Karen goes into labor and eventually gives birth to a daughter. Mal takes Karen to Meta Solutions to evaluate her powers, as it was the same company that took his powers away. Unbeknownst to them, Meta Solutions is run by Psimon and the Fearsome Five, which Mal realizes after spotting Mammoth in the lobby. Though the Fearsome Five claims to have changed, the Titans investigate their headquarters and come under attack. Karen suits up using a special suit designed for her by Meta Solutions and discovers she has the ability to fly and shrink. She manages to rescue the Titans, but Psimon takes her memories of Mal and her child. Karen later regains her memories and retires to be with her family.

== Powers and abilities ==
Bumblebee originally had no true superpowers and her unique abilities were derived from her high-tech battle suit. The suit greatly increased her strength, speed, stamina, endurance, agility, reflexes and acted as body armor. It also allowed her to fly and generate electricity and yellow honey-like adhesives. Bumblebee was later given the ability to shrink to the size of a bee, a power inspired by her animated counterpart.

== Other versions ==
- A young, alternate universe incarnation of Bumblebee appears in Tiny Titans.
- An alternate timeline incarnation of Bumblebee appears in Titans Tomorrow as a member of Cyborg's Titans East.

== In other media ==
=== Television ===
Bumblebee as she appears in the Teen Titans animated series.

- A young Bumblebee appears in Teen Titans (2003), voiced by T'Keyah Crystal Keymáh. This version is an honorary member of the Teen Titans and a founding member of Titans East who later becomes their leader following Brother Blood's attempt to seek revenge on them and Cyborg.
- Bumblebee appears in Teen Titans Go! (2013), voiced by Ozioma Akagha. This version was formerly a member of the Teen Titans and Titans East before leaving them both to become a solo hero. The DC Super Hero Girls incarnation of the character also appears, voiced again by Kimberly Brooks.
- Karen Beecher appears in Young Justice, voiced by Masasa Moyo. Introduced in "Targets", she is initially a high school student and head of the "Bumblebees" cheerleading team at Happy Harbor High School. As of the second season, Young Justice: Invasion, Beecher has become Bumblebee, joined the Team, and became a protégé and lab assistant to Ray Palmer. As of the third season, Young Justice: Outsiders, Beecher retired to focus on her relationship with Mal Duncan, scientific studies, and pregnancy, eventually giving birth to a baby girl named Rhea. Due to Rhea being born with a congenital heart defect and no surgeon being available, Beecher uses her abilities to perform the surgery herself. In the process, she contemplates activating Rhea's metagene.
- Bumblebee appears in DC Super Hero Girls (2019), voiced by Kimberly Brooks. This version is technologically minded yet shy and nervous.

=== Film ===
- An alternate universe incarnation of Karen Beecher makes a cameo appearance in Justice League: Gods and Monsters, voiced by Kari Wahlgren. This version is a scientist in Lex Luthor's "Project Fair Play", a weapons contingency program meant to counter their universe's Justice League if necessary, before being killed by the Metal Men.
- Bumblebee appears in the DC Animated Movie Universe (DCAMU) film Teen Titans: The Judas Contract, voiced again by Masasa Moyo. This version is a founding member of the Teen Titans.
- Bumblebee makes a cameo appearance in Teen Titans Go! To the Movies.
- Bumblebee makes a non-speaking appearance in a flashback in the DCAMU film Justice League Dark: Apokolips War. She rejoins the Titans to defend Earth from Darkseid, but is killed by Paradooms.
- Bumblebee appears in Teen Titans Go! & DC Super Hero Girls: Mayhem in the Multiverse, voiced again by Kimberly Brooks.

=== Video games ===
- Bumblebee appears as an unlockable character in Teen Titans (2006), voiced again by T'Keyah Crystal Keymáh.
- Bumblebee appears as a boss in Superman Returns. This version is a supervillain who is accompanied by a "hive" of clones.
- The Young Justice incarnation of Bumblebee appears as a playable character in Young Justice: Legacy.
- Bumblebee appears as a character summon in Scribblenauts Unmasked: A DC Comics Adventure.
- Bumblebee appears in DC Super Hero Girls: Teen Power, voiced again by Kimberly Brooks.

=== Miscellaneous ===
- Bumblebee appears in Teen Titans Go! (2004).
- Bumblebee appears in DC Super Hero Girls (2015) and its tie-in films, voiced by Teala Dunn. This version is a student at Super Hero High.
- Bumblebee appears as part of Lego's DC Super Heroes minifigure series.
