= List of black animated characters: 2010s =

This list of black animated characters lists fictional characters found on animated television series and in motion pictures, from 2010 to 2019. The Black people in this list include African American animated characters and other characters of Sub-Saharan African descent or populations characterized by dark skin color (a definition that also includes certain populations in Oceania, the southern West Asia, and the Siddi of southern South Asia).

The names are organized alphabetically by surname (i.e. last name), or by single name if the character does not have a surname.

== List ==
Character	Title	Duration	Voice actor	Creator	Ref.
Able	Tron: Uprising	2012-2013	Reginald VelJohnson	Edward Kitsis	
Able	Tron: Uprising	2012-2013	Reginald VelJohnson	Adam Horowitz	
Aisha	Winx Club 3D: Magical Adventure	2010	Keke Palmer	Iginio Straffi	
Aisha	Winx Club 3D: Magical Adventure	2010	Mela Lee	Iginio Straffi	
Aisha	Winx Club 3D: Magical Adventure	2010	Laura Lenghi	Iginio Straffi	
Aisha	Winx Club: The Mystery of the Abyss	2014	Mela Lee	Iginio Straffi	
Aisha	Winx Club: The Mystery of the Abyss	2014	Laura Lenghi	Iginio Straffi	
Aisha	World of Winx	2016-2017	Elinor Vanderburg	Iginio Straffi	
Aisha	World of Winx	2016-2017	Alysha Deslorieux	Iginio Straffi	
Aisha	World of Winx	2016-2017	Laura Lenghi	Iginio Straffi	
Agil (Andrew Gilbert Mills)	Sword Art Online	2012	Yasumoto Hiroki	Reki Kawahara	
Agil (Andrew Gilbert Mills)	Sword Art Online	2012	Patrick Seitz	Reki Kawahara	
Corsac Albain	RWBY	2013-	Derek Mears	Monty Oum	
Fennec Albain	RWBY	2013-	Mike McFarland	Monty Oum	
Fox Alistair	RWBY	2013-	N/A	Monty Oum	
Allura	Voltron: Legendary Defender	2016-2018	Kimberly Brooks	Joaquim Dos Santos	
Allura	Voltron: Legendary Defender	2016-2018	Kimberly Brooks	Lauren Montgomery	
Alyx	RWBY	2013-	Shara Kirby	Monty Oum	
Amara	Elena of Avalor	2016–2020	Zoe Hendrix	Craig Gerber	
Aneka	Avengers Assemble	2013-2019	Erica Luttrell	Man of Action	
Aneka	Avengers Assemble	2013-2019	Erica Luttrell	Marvel Animation	
Anir	Fast & Furious Spy Racers	2019-2021	Adetokumboh M'Cormack	Tim Hedrick	
Anir	Fast & Furious Spy Racers	2019-2021	Adetokumboh M'Cormack	Bret Haaland	
Arslan Altan	RWBY	2013-	Ami Naito	Monty Oum	
Tag Anaton	Prisoner Zero	2016	Danny Carmel	Jason Haigh-Ellery	
Tag Anaton	Prisoner Zero	2016	Danny Carmel	Austen Atkinson	
Aunt Angelique	Neo Yokio	2017–2018	Unknown	Ezra Koenig	
Aqualad / Aquaman / Kaldur'ahm	Young Justice	2010-2022	Khary Payton	Brandon Vietti	
Aqualad / Aquaman / Kaldur'ahm	Young Justice	2010-2022	Khary Payton	Greg Weisman	
Muhammad Avdol	JoJo's Bizarre Adventure: Stardust Crusaders	2014–2015	Kenta Miyake	Hirohiko Araki	
Quint Baker	The Last Kids on Earth	2019–2021	Garland Whitt	Max Brallier	
Aunt Bam	Tyler Perry's Madea's Tough Love	2015	Cassi Davis	Frank Marino	
Bartik	Tron: Uprising	2012-2013	Donald Faison	Edward Kitsis	
Bartik	Tron: Uprising	2012-2013	Donald Faison	Adam Horowitz	
George Beard	The Epic Tales of Captain Underpants	2018–2019	Ramone Hamilton	Dav Pilkey	
Bumblebee / Karne Beecher	Young Justice	2010-2022	Masasa Moyo	Brandon Vietti	
Bumblebee / Karne Beecher	Young Justice	2010-2022	Masasa Moyo	Greg Weisman	
Bem	BEM	2019	Katsuyuki Konishi	ADK Emotions	
Frostee Benson	Fast & Furious Spy Racers	2019-2021	Luke Youngblood	Tim Hedrick	
Frostee Benson	Fast & Furious Spy Racers	2019-2021	Luke Youngblood	Bret Haaland	
Sissy Benson	Fast & Furious Spy Racers	2019-2021	Similce Diesel	Bret Haaland	
Wanda Benson	Fast & Furious Spy Racers	2019-2021	Kimberly Brooks	Bret Haaland	
Bernice	Twinkle Toes Lights Up New York	2016	Jennie Kwan	John Massé	
Billy	Cannon Busters	2019	Barry Mitchell	LeSean Thomas	
Black Panther (T'Challa)	Black Panther	2010	Djimon Hounsou	Reginald Hudlin	
Black Panther (T'Challa)	The Avengers: Earth's Mightiest Heroes	2010-2013	James C. Mathis III	Ciro Nieli	
Black Panther (T'Challa)	The Avengers: Earth's Mightiest Heroes	2010-2013	James C. Mathis III	Joshua Fine	
Black Panther (T'Challa)	The Avengers: Earth's Mightiest Heroes	2010-2013	James C. Mathis III	Christopher Yost	
Black Panther (T'Challa)	Avengers Assemble	2013-2019	James C. Mathis III	Marvel Animation	
Black Panther (T'Challa)	Avengers Assemble	2013-2019	James C. Mathis III	Man of Action	
Black Panther (T'Challa)	Marvel Future Avengers	2017-2018	James C. Mathis III	Madhouse	
Black Panther (T'Challa)	Marvel Future Avengers	2017-2018	James C. Mathis III	Walt Disney Japan	
Bob	Pinky Malinky	2019	Vargus Mason	Chris Garbutt	
Bob	Pinky Malinky	2019	Vargus Mason	Rikke Asbjoern	
Bobe	Home: Adventures with Tip & Oh	2016-2018	Dawnn Lewis	Ryan Crego	
Bobe	Home: Adventures with Tip & Oh	2016-2018	Dawnn Lewis	Thurop Van Orman	
Sheriff Blubs	Gravity Falls	2012–2016	Kenta Miyake	Hirohiko Araki	
Harriet Bree	RWBY	2013-	Anairis Quiñones	Monty Oum	
Brigid	Star vs. the Forces of Evil	2015–2019	Yvette Nicole Brown	Daron Nefcy	
Smokey Brown	JoJo's Bizarre Adventure: Battle Tendency	2012–2013	Yū Hayashi	Hirohiko Araki	
Black Manta	Young Justice	2010-2022	Khary Payton	Brandon Vietti	
Black Manta	Young Justice	2010-2022	Khary Payton	Greg Weisman	
Blisstina Utonium	The Powerpuff Girls	2012-2013	Olivia Olson	Nick Jennings	
Blisstina Utonium	The Powerpuff Girls	2012-2013	Olivia Olson	Bob Boyle	
Bow	She-Ra and the Princesses of Power	2018–2020	Marcus Scribner	ND Stevenson	
Estelle Brady	Be Cool, Scooby-Doo!	2015-2018	Kimberly Brooks	Shaunt Nigoghossian	
Estelle Brady	Be Cool, Scooby-Doo!	2015-2018	Kimberly Brooks	Jeff Mednikow	
Estelle Brady	Be Cool, Scooby-Doo!	2015-2018	Kimberly Brooks	Andy Thom	
Estelle Brady	Be Cool, Scooby-Doo!	2015-2018	Kimberly Brooks	James Krenzke	
Estelle Brady	Be Cool, Scooby-Doo!	2015-2018	Kimberly Brooks	Ron Rubio	
Brenda	Smallfoot	2018	Yara Shahidi	Karey Kirkpatrick	
Simon Brezhnev	Durarara!	2010	Takaya Kuroda	Ryōgo Narita	
Simon Brezhnev	Durarara!	2015–2016	Patrick Seitz	Ryōgo Narita	
Carter Brown	Craig of the Creek	2018-	Zeno Robinson	Matt Burnett	
Carter Brown	Craig of the Creek	2018-	Zeno Robinson	Ben Levin	
King Bulgher	Cannon Busters	2019	John Eric Bentley	LeSean Thomas	
Bumblebee	DC Super Hero Girls	2019–2021	Kimberly Brooks	Lauren Faust	
Babs Byuteman	Pinky Malinky	2019	Diamond White	Chris Garbutt	
Babs Byuteman	Pinky Malinky	2019	Diamond White	Rikke Asbjoern	
Amanda Cage	Ultimate Spider-Man	2012–2017	Kimberly Brooks	Marvel Animation	
Luke Cage	Ultimate Spider-Man	2012–2017	Ogie Banks	Marvel Animation	
Walter Cage	Ultimate Spider-Man	2012–2017	Phil LaMarr	Marvel Animation	
Maria Calavera	RWBY	2013-	Melissa Sternenberg	Monty Oum	
Lando Calrissian	Lego Star Wars: Droid Tales	2015	Billy Dee Williams	Carrie Beck	
Lando Calrissian	Lego Star Wars: Droid Tales	2015	Billy Dee Williams	Jason Cosler	
Lando Calrissian	Lego Star Wars: Droid Tales	2015	Billy Dee Williams	Jake Blais	
Lando Calrissian	Lego Star Wars: Droid Tales	2015	Billy Dee Williams	Jakob Liesenfeld	
Lando Calrissian	Lego Star Wars: Droid Tales	2015	Billy Dee Williams	Jens Kronvold Frederiksen	
Lando Calrissian	Lego Star Wars: Droid Tales	2015	Billy Dee Williams	John McCormack	
Lando Calrissian	Lego Star Wars: Droid Tales	2015	Billy Dee Williams	Keith Malone	
Lando Calrissian	Lego Star Wars: Droid Tales	2015	Billy Dee Williams	Kurt Kristiansen	
Lando Calrissian	Lego Star Wars: Droid Tales	2015	Billy Dee Williams	Mathew Steven Boyle	
Lando Calrissian	Star Wars Rebels	2016-2018	Billy Dee Williams	Simon Kinberg	
Lando Calrissian	Star Wars Rebels	2016-2018	Billy Dee Williams	Dave Filoni	
Lando Calrissian	Star Wars Rebels	2016-2018	Billy Dee Williams	Carrie Beck	
Lando Calrissian	Lego Star Wars: All-Stars	2018	Zeno Robinson	Carrie Beck	
Lando Calrissian	Lego Star Wars: All-Stars	2018	Zeno Robinson	Jake Blais	
Lando Calrissian	Lego Star Wars: All-Stars	2018	Zeno Robinson	Leland Chee	
Lando Calrissian	Lego Star Wars: All-Stars	2018	Zeno Robinson	Jason Cosler	
Lando Calrissian	Lego Star Wars: All-Stars	2018	Zeno Robinson	Keith Malone	
Lando Calrissian	Lego Star Wars: All-Stars	2018	Zeno Robinson	Bill Motz	
Lando Calrissian	Lego Star Wars: All-Stars	2018	Zeno Robinson	Josh Rimes	
Lando Calrissian	Lego Star Wars: All-Stars	2018	Zeno Robinson	Both Roth	
Camila	RWBY	2013-	Anairis Quinones	Monty Oum	
Canary	Hunter x Hunter	2011-2014	Motoko Kumai	Yoshihiro Togashi	
Canary	Hunter x Hunter	2011-2014	Mela Lee	Yoshihiro Togashi	
Monsieur Capri	Twinkle Toes Lights Up New York	2016	Keith Silverstein	John Massé	
Carl	Pinky Malinky	2019	Kimberly Brooks	Chris Garbutt	
Carl	Pinky Malinky	2019	Kimberly Brooks	Rikke Asbjoern	
Casca	Berserk	2016-2017	Toa Yukinari	Kentaro Miura	
Casca	Berserk	2016-2017	Karen Strassman	Kentaro Miura	
Julian Chase	gen:LOCK	2019–2021	Michael B. Jordan	Gray Haddock	
Chief (Tamara Fraser)	Carmen Sandiego	2019–2021	Dawnn Lewis	Duane Capizzi	
Claire	Motorcity	2012–2013	Dana Davis	David Bickel	
Flynt Coal	RWBY	2013-	Flynt Flossy	Monty Oum	
Corvus	The Dragon Prince	2018-2024	Omari Newton	Aaron Ehasz	
Corvus	The Dragon Prince	2018-2024	Omari Newton	Justin Richmond	
Crystal	Scooby-Doo! Abracadabra-Doo	2010	Crystal Scales	Spike Brandt	
Crystal	Scooby-Doo! Abracadabra-Doo	2010	Crystal Scales	Tony Cervone	
Cutler	Tron: Uprising	2012-2013	Lance Reddick	Edward Kitsis	
Cutler	Tron: Uprising	2012-2013	Lance Reddick	Adam Horowitz	
Cyborg (Victor Stone)	DC Super Friends	2010-	Phil LaMarr	Imaginext	
Cyborg (Victor Stone)	Teen Titans Go!	2013-	Khary Payton	Michael Jelenic	
Cyborg (Victor Stone)	Teen Titans Go!	2013-	Khary Payton	Aaron Horvath	
Cyborg (Victor Stone)	Young Justice	2010-2022	Zeno Robinson	Brandon Vietti	
Cyborg (Victor Stone)	Young Justice	2010-2022	Zeno Robinson	Greg Weisman	
Cyborg (Victor Stone)	Justice League: The Flashpoint Paradox	2013	Michael B. Jordan	Jay Oliva	
Cyborg 008 (Pyunma)	009 Re:Cyborg	2012	Marcus Griffin	Shotaro Ishinomori	
Cyborg 008 (Pyunma)	Cyborg 009: Call of Justice	2016	Haruki Ishiya	Shotaro Ishinomori	
Cyborg 008 (Pyunma)	Cyborg 009 vs Devilman	2015	Steve Staley	Shotaro Ishinomori	
Cyborg 008 (Pyunma)	Cyborg 009 vs Devilman	2015	Ayumu Okamura	Shotaro Ishinomori	
Dang Dang	Tyler Perry's Madea's Tough Love	2015	Indigo	Frank Marino	
Charlie Daggett	Young Justice	2010-2022	Kevin Michael Richardson	Brandon Vietti	
Charlie Daggett	Young Justice	2010-2022	Kevin Michael Richardson	Greg Weisman	
DeeJay	Your Favorite Martian	2011–2012	Rick Carter	Ray William Johnson	
DeeJay	Your Favorite Martian	2022-	Rick Carter	Ray William Johnson	
Daddy Lidz	Young Justice	2010-2022	Kevin Michael Richardson	Brandon Vietti	
Daddy Lidz	Young Justice	2010-2022	Kevin Michael Richardson	Greg Weisman	
Delinquinetta	Tyler Perry's Madea's Tough Love	2015	Mari Williams	Frank Marino	
Doc (Carl W. Greer)	G.I. Joe: Renegades	2010–2011	Phil LaMarr	Larry Hama	
Don	The Promised Neverland	2019–2021	Cedric Williams	Kaiu Shirai	
Darla Dudley	Justice League: War	2014	Kimberly Brooks	James Tucker	
Angel Dynamite / Cassidy Williams	Scooby-Doo! Mystery Incorporated	2010-2013	Vivica A. Fox	Mitch Watson	
Angel Dynamite / Cassidy Williams	Scooby-Doo! Mystery Incorporated	2010-2013	Kimberly Brooks	Spike Brandt	
Angel Dynamite / Cassidy Williams	Scooby-Doo! Mystery Incorporated	2010-2013	Kimberly Brooks	Tony Cervone	
Esidisi	JoJo's Bizarre Adventure: Battle Tendency	2012–2013	Chris Jai Alex	Hirohiko Araki	
Esther	Twelve Forever	2019	Jaylen Barron	Julia Vickerman	
Ezran	The Dragon Prince	2018-2024	Sasha Rojen	Aaron Ehasz	
Ezran	The Dragon Prince	2018-2024	Sasha Rojen	Justin Richmond	
Fake Philly	Cannon Busters	2019	Ogie Banks	LeSean Thomas	
Falcon (Sam Wilson)	The Avengers: Earth's Mightiest Heroes	2010-2012	Lance Reddick	Ciro Nieli	
Falcon (Sam Wilson)	The Avengers: Earth's Mightiest Heroes	2010-2012	Lance Reddick	Joshua Fine	
Falcon (Sam Wilson)	The Avengers: Earth's Mightiest Heroes	2010-2012	Lance Reddick	Christopher Yost	
Falcon (Sam Wilson)	Ultimate Spider-Man	2012–2017	Bumper Robinson	Marvel Animation	
Falcon (Sam Wilson)	Avengers Assemble	2013-2019	Bumper Robinson	Marvel Animation	
Falcon (Sam Wilson)	Avengers Assemble	2013-2019	Bumper Robinson	Man of Action	
Falcon (Sam Wilson)	Marvel Future Avengers	2017-2018	Bumper Robinson	Madhouse	
Falcon (Sam Wilson)	Marvel Future Avengers	2017-2018	Bumper Robinson	Walt Disney Japan	
Flora	Carole and Tuesday	2019–2020	Megumi Hayashibara	Shinichirō Watanabe	
Nick Fury	Iron Man: Rise of Technovore	2013	John Eric Bentley	Madhouse	
Saw Gerrera	Star Wars Rebels	2016-2018	Forest Whitaker	Simon Kinberg	
Saw Gerrera	Star Wars Rebels	2016-2018	Forest Whitaker	Dave Filoni	
Saw Gerrera	Star Wars Rebels	2016-2018	Forest Whitaker	Carrie Beck	
Dan Fluunk	Scooby-Doo! Mystery Incorporated	2010-2013	Kevin Michael Richardson	Mitch Watson	
Dan Fluunk	Scooby-Doo! Mystery Incorporated	2010-2013	Kevin Michael Richardson	Spike Brandt	
Dan Fluunk	Scooby-Doo! Mystery Incorporated	2010-2013	Kevin Michael Richardson	Tony Cervone	
Missy Foreman-Greenwald	Big Mouth	2017-	Jenny Slate	Andrew Goldberg	
Missy Foreman-Greenwald	Big Mouth	2017-	Jenny Slate	Nick Kroll	
Missy Foreman-Greenwald	Big Mouth	2017-	Jenny Slate	Mark Levin	
Missy Foreman-Greenwald	Big Mouth	2017-	Jenny Slate	Jennifer Flackett	
Keesha Franklin	The Magic School Bus Rides Again	2017-2020	Mikaela Blake	Joanna Cole	
Keesha Franklin	The Magic School Bus Rides Again	2017-2020	Mikaela Blake	Bruce Degen	
Franklin	Peanuts	2016	Caleel Harris	Charles M. Schulz	
Franklin	Snoopy in Space	2019-	Christian Dal Dosso	Charles M. Schulz	
Lucius Fox	DC Super Hero Girls	2015-2018	Phil LaMarr	Shea Fontana	
Lucius Fox	DC Super Hero Girls	2015-2018	Phil LaMarr	Lisa Yee	
Lucius Fox	DC Super Hero Girls	2015-2018	Phil LaMarr	Aria Moffly	
Lucius Fox	Batman: Bad Blood	2016	Ernie Hudson	Jay Oliva	
Lucius Fox	Harley Quinn	2019-	Phil LaMarr	Justin Halpern	
Lucius Fox	Harley Quinn	2019-	Phil LaMarr	Patrick Schumacker	
Lucius Fox	Harley Quinn	2019-	Phil LaMarr	Dean Lorey	
Frida	Hilda	2018–2024	Ameerah Falzon-Ojo	Luke Pearson	
Frozone (Lucius Best)	Incredibles 2	2018	Samuel L. Jackson	Brad Bird	
Gayle	We Bare Bears	2015–2019	Channon Dade	Daniel Chong	
Gazelle	Princess Principal	2017	Melanie Burke	Masaki Tachibana	
Gazelle	Princess Principal	2017	Yuko Iida	Masaki Tachibana	
George	She-Ra and the Princesses of Power	2018–2020	Chris Jai Alex	ND Stevenson	
Glenn	The Addams Family	2019	Tituss Burgess	Gail Berman	
Glenn	The Addams Family	2019	Tituss Burgess	Conrad Vernon	
Glenn	The Addams Family	2019	Tituss Burgess	Alex Schwartz	
Glenn	The Addams Family	2019	Tituss Burgess	Alison O'Brien	
Glori	Mighty Magiswords	2016–2019	Erica Luttrell	Kyle Carrozza	
Dutch Gordy	Motorcity	2012-2013	Kel Mitchell	David Bickel	
Mr. Gordy	Motorcity	2012-2013	Gary Anthony Williams	David Bickel	
Mrs. Gordy	Motorcity	2012-2013	Kimberly Brooks	David Bickel	
Gorgeous G.	Scooby-Doo! Mystery Incorporated	2010-2013	Roz Ryan	Mitch Watson	
Gorgeous G.	Scooby-Doo! Mystery Incorporated	2010-2013	Roz Ryan	Spike Brandt	
Gorgeous G.	Scooby-Doo! Mystery Incorporated	2010-2013	Roz Ryan	Tony Cervone	
Al Granger	Spirit Riding Free	2017-2020	Jonathan Craig Williams	Aury Wallington	
Fannie Granger	Spirit Riding Free	2017-2020	Dawnn Lewis	Aury Wallington	
Pru Granger	Spirit Riding Free	2017-2020	Sydney Park	Aury Wallington	
Mercy Graves	The Death of Superman	2018	Erica Luttrell	Sam Liu	
Mercy Graves	The Death of Superman	2018	Erica Luttrell	Amy McKenna	
Green Lantern / John Stewart	Young Justice	2010-2022	Kevin Michael Richardson	Brandon Vietti	
Green Lantern / John Stewart	Young Justice	2010-2022	Kevin Michael Richardson	Greg Weisman	
Guardian / Mal Duncan	Young Justice	2010-2022	Kevin Michael Richardson	Brandon Vietti	
Guardian / Mal Duncan	Young Justice	2010-2022	Kevin Michael Richardson	Greg Weisman	
Alva Gunderson	Disenchantment	2018–2023	Richard Ayoade	Matt Groening	
Inori Hakkai	Nanbaka	2016–2017	Mitsutaka Itakura	Shō Futamata	
Virgil Hawkins / Static	Young Justice	2010-2022	Bryton James	Brandon Vietti	
Virgil Hawkins / Static	Young Justice	2010-2022	Bryton James	Greg Weisman	
Harris	Squid Girl	2010-2014	Masahiro Anbe	Seiji Sasaki	
Harris	Squid Girl	2010-2014	Masahiro Anbe	Phineas	
Harris	Squid Girl	2010-2014	Masahiro Anbe	Andrew Love	
Heimdall	Hulk and the Agents of S.M.A.S.H.	2013-2015	Chris Bosh	Paul Dini	
Heimdall	Hulk and the Agents of S.M.A.S.H.	2013-2015	Chris Bosh	Henry Gilroy	
Heimdall	Avengers Assemble	2013-2019	Kevin Michael Richardson	Marvel Animation	
Heimdall	Avengers Assemble	2013-2019	James C. Mathis III	Man of Action	
Heimdall	Guardians of the Galaxy	2015–2019	Kevin Michael Richardson	Marty Isenberg	
Heles, Goddess of Destruction	Dragon Ball Super	2015–2018	Maryam Baig	Akira Toriyama	
Hilda	Cannon Busters	2019	Angelique Perrin	LeSean Thomas	
Holocaust	Young Justice	2010-2022	Zeno Robinson	Brandon Vietti	
Holocaust	Young Justice	2010-2022	Zeno Robinson	Greg Weisman	
Michael Holt	Beware the Batman	2013-2014	Glen Murakami	Gary Anthony Williams	
Michael Holt	Beware the Batman	2013-2014	Sam Register		
Michael Holt	Beware the Batman	2013-2014	Mitch Watson		
Michael Holt	Beware the Batman	2013-2014	Butch Lukic		
Michael Holt	Justice League: Gods and Monsters	2015	Sam Liu	Arif S. Kinchen	
King Dad	Nella the Princess Knight	2017–2021	Ty Jones	Christine Ricci	
King Harrow	The Dragon Prince	2018-2024	Luc Roderique	Aaron Ehasz	
King Harrow	The Dragon Prince	2018-2024	Luc Roderique	Justin Richmond	
Heavy Duty (Lamont A. Morris)	G.I. Joe: Renegades	2010-2011	Keith Ferguson	Henry Gilroy	
Heavy Duty (Lamont A. Morris)	G.I. Joe: Renegades	2010-2011	Keith Ferguson	Marty Isenberg	
Heavy Duty (Lamont A. Morris)	G.I. Joe: Renegades	2010-2011	Keith Ferguson	Jeff Kline	
Herald	Young Justice	2010-2022	Kevin Michael Richardson	Brandon Vietti	
Herald	Young Justice	2010-2022	Kevin Michael Richardson	Greg Weisman	
Betsy Holiday	Tyler Perry's Madea's Tough Love	2015	Rolonda Watts	Frank Marino	
Icon	Young Justice	2010-2022	Kevin Michael Richardson	Brandon Vietti	
Icon	Young Justice	2010-2022	Kevin Michael Richardson	Greg Weisman	
Iridessa	Tinker Bell and the Great Fairy Rescue	2010	Raven-Symoné	Disneytoon Studios	
Iridessa	Pixie Hollow Games	2011	Raven-Symoné	Disneytoon Studios	
Iridessa	Secret of the Wings	2012	Raven-Symoné	Disneytoon Studios	
Iridessa	The Pirate Fairy	2014	Raven-Symoné	Disneytoon Studios	
Iridessa	Tinker Bell and the Legend of the NeverBeast	2015	Raven-Symoné	Disneytoon Studios	
Ironheart / Riri Williams	Marvel Rising: Heart of Iron	2018	Sofia Wylie	Margaret Dunlap	
Commander M. Iverson	Voltron: Legendary Defender	2016-2018	Nolan North	Joaquim Dos Santos	
Commander M. Iverson	Voltron: Legendary Defender	2016-2018	Nolan North	Lauren Montgomery	
Janai	The Dragon Prince	2018-2024	Rena Anakwe	Aaron Ehasz	
Janai	The Dragon Prince	2018-2024	Rena Anakwe	Justin Richmond	
Firestorm (Jefferson Jackson)	Vixen	2015-2016	Franz Drameh	Greg Berlanti	
Firestorm (Jefferson Jackson)	Vixen	2015-2016	Franz Drameh	Marc Guggenheim	
Firestorm (Jefferson Jackson)	Vixen	2015-2016	Franz Drameh	Andrew Kreisberg	
Cornell Jelly	The Jellies!	2017-2019	Phil LaMarr	Tyler, The Creator	
Cornell Jelly	The Jellies!	2017-2019	Phil LaMarr	Lionel Boyce	
Gerald Johanssen	Hey Arnold!: The Jungle Movie	2017	Jamil Walker Smith	Craig Bartlett	
Kaz Kaan	Neo Yokio	2017–2018	Jaden Smith	Ezra Koenig	
Musa Kamara	Run with the Wind	2018–2019	Hideaki Kabumoto	Shion Miura	
Mr. Kapusinski	Twelve Forever	2019	John Eric Bentley	Julia Vickerman	
Prince Kelby	Cannon Busters	2019	Zeno Robinson	LeSean Thomas	
Khadijah	Steven Universe Future	2019–2020	Uzo Aduba	Rebecca Sugar	
Sienna Khan	RWBY	2013-	Monica Rial	Monty Oum	
Kiawe	Pokémon the Series: Sun & Moon	2016–2017	Kaito Ishikawa	TV Tokyo	
Kimmy	Danger & Eggs	2017	Kimberly Brooks	Shadi Petosky	
Kirikou	Kirikou and the Wild Beasts	2012	Pierre-Ndoffé Sarr	Michel Ocelot	
Kit	Craig of the Creek	2018-2024	Dana Davis	Matt Burnett	
Kit	Craig of the Creek	2018-2024	Dana Davis	Ben Levin	
Sister Krone	The Promised Neverland	2019–2021	Nao Fujita	Kaiu Shirai	
Krone	Wild Kratts	2011-2021	Sabryn Rock	Chris Kratt	
Krone	Wild Kratts	2011-2021	Sabryn Rock	Martin Kratt	
Krone	The Promised Neverland	2019–2021	Rebeka Thomas	Kaiu Shirai	
Kuasa	Vixen	2015-2016	Anika Noni Rose	Greg Berlanti	
Kuasa	Vixen	2015-2016	Anika Noni Rose	Marc Guggenheim	
Kuasa	Vixen	2015-2016	Anika Noni Rose	Andrew Kreisberg	
Colonel Kubritz	3Below: Tales of Arcadia	2018–2019	Uzo Aduba	Guillermo del Toro	
Lady Day	Cannon Busters	2019	Debra Wilson	LeSean Thomas	
Lance	She-Ra and the Princesses of Power	2018–2020	Regi Davis	ND Stevenson	
Zare Leonis	Star Wars Rebels	2016-2018	Bryton James	Simon Kinberg	
Zare Leonis	Star Wars Rebels	2016-2018	Bryton James	Dave Filoni	
Zare Leonis	Star Wars Rebels	2016-2018	Bryton James	Carrie Beck	
Lewis	RWBY	2013-	N/A	Monty Oum	
Lexy	Neo Yokio	2017–2018	The Kid Mero	Ezra Koenig	
Lilly	Fresh Beat Band of Spies	2015-2016	Heaven White	Nadine van der Velde	
Lilly	Fresh Beat Band of Spies	2015-2016	Heaven White	Scott Kraft	
Lonnie	She-Ra and the Princesses of Power	2018–2020	Dana Davis	ND Stevenson	
Marisol Lopez Lugo	The Boss Baby: Back in Business	2018–2020	Sarah-Nicole Robles	Brandon Sawyer	
Lorelei	Cannon Busters	2019	Kimberly Marable	LeSean Thomas	
Foxxy Love	The Drawn Together Movie: The Movie!	2010	Cree Summer	Greg Franklin	
Lex Luthor	Harley Quinn	2019-	Giancarlo Esposito	Justin Halpern	
Lex Luthor	Harley Quinn	2019-	Giancarlo Esposito	Patrick Schumacker	
Lex Luthor	Harley Quinn	2019-	Giancarlo Esposito	Dean Lorey	
Professor Macalester	Vixen	2015-2016	Sean Patrick Thomas	Greg Berlanti	
Professor Macalester	Vixen	2015-2016	Sean Patrick Thomas	Marc Guggenheim	
Professor Macalester	Vixen	2015-2016	Sean Patrick Thomas	Andrew Kreisberg	
Madea	Tyler Perry's Madea's Tough Love	2015	Tyler Perry	Frank Marino	
Lady Marmalade	Scooby-Doo! Mystery Incorporated	2010-2013	Cree Summer	Mitch Watson	
Lady Marmalade	Scooby-Doo! Mystery Incorporated	2010-2013	Cree Summer	Spike Brandt	
Lady Marmalade	Scooby-Doo! Mystery Incorporated	2010-2013	Cree Summer	Tony Cervone	
Maya	Craig of the Creek	2018-2024	Sydney Mikayla	Matt Burnett	
Maya	Craig of the Creek	2018-2024	Sydney Mikayla	Ben Levin	
Mayor	Danger & Eggs	2017	Angelica Ross	Shadi Petosky	
Clyde McBride	The Loud House	2016-	Andre Robinson	Chris Savino	
Clyde McBride	The Loud House	2016-	Caleel Harris	Chris Savino	
Harold McBride	The Loud House	2016-	Wayne Brady	Chris Savino	
Mari McCabe (Vixen)	Vixen	2015-2016	Kimberly Brooks	Greg Berlanti	
Mari McCabe (Vixen)	Vixen	2015-2016	Megalyn Echikunwoke	Marc Guggenheim	
Mari McCabe (Vixen)	Vixen	2015-2016	Megalyn Echikunwoke	Andrew Kreisberg	
Mari McCabe (Vixen)	DC Super Hero Girls	2015-2018	Kimberly Brooks	Shea Fontana	
Mari McCabe (Vixen)	DC Super Hero Girls	2015-2018	Kimberly Brooks	Lisa Yee	
Mari McCabe (Vixen)	DC Super Hero Girls	2015-2018	Kimberly Brooks	Aria Moffly	
Mari McCabe (Vixen)	Justice League Action	2016-2018	Jasika Nicole	Jim Krieg	
Mari McCabe (Vixen)	Justice League Action	2016-2018	Jasika Nicole	Butch Lukic	
Mari McCabe (Vixen)	Justice League Action	2016-2018	Jasika Nicole	Alan Burnett	
Mari McCabe (Vixen)	Freedom Fighters: The Ray	2017-2018	Megalyn Echikunwoke	Greg Berlanti	
Mari McCabe (Vixen)	Freedom Fighters: The Ray	2017-2018	Megalyn Echikunwoke	Marc Guggenheim	
Slam McJackson	Action Dad	2012	Michael Donovan	Andrew Dickman	
Hardcastle McCloud	Pinky Malinky	2019	Vargus Mason	Chris Garbutt	
Hardcastle McCloud	Pinky Malinky	2019	Vargus Mason	Rikke Asbjoern	
Doc McStuffins	Doc McStuffins	2012-2020	Kiara Muhammad	Chris Nee	
Doc McStuffins	Doc McStuffins	2012-2020	Laya DeLeon Hayes	Chris Nee	
Melenor	Voltron: Legendary Defender	2016-2018	Kimberly Brooks	Joaquim Dos Santos	
Melenor	Voltron: Legendary Defender	2016-2018	Kimberly Brooks	Lauren Montgomery	
Mermista	She-Ra and the Princesses of Power	2018–2020	Vella Lovell	ND Stevenson	
Theodore "Theo" Merton Jr.	Looped	2016	Kevin Duhaney	Todd Kauffman	
Theodore "Theo" Merton Jr.	Looped	2016	Kevin Duhaney	Mark Thornton	
Ogun Montgomery	Fire Force	2019-2020	Makoto Furukawa	Atsushi Ohkubo	
Ogun Montgomery	Fire Force	2019-2020	Zeno Robinson	Atsushi Ohkubo	
Miles Morales (Spider-Man)	Spider-Man: Into the Spider-Verse	2018–2020	Shameik Moore	Sony Pictures Releasing	
Milo	Danger & Eggs	2017	Tyler Ford	Shadi Petosky	
Nate	We Bare Bears	2015–2019	Christopher Gallant	Daniel Chong	
Nella	Nella the Princess Knight	2017–2021	Akira Golz	Christine Ricci	
William "Wilee" Nelson	Jormungand	2012	Kenji Nomura	Keitaro Takahashi	
Fisher Ness	Mobile Suit Gundam Thunderbolt	2017	Ryōsuke Morita	Yasuo Ohtagaki	
Fisher Ness	Mobile Suit Gundam Thunderbolt	2017	Chris Jai Alex	Yasuo Ohtagaki	
Netossa	She-Ra and the Princesses of Power	2018–2020	Krystal Joy Brown	ND Stevenson	
Nia	The Bravest Knight	2019	Storm Reid	Daniel Errico	
Noville	Mighty Magiswords	2016–2019	Phil LaMarr	Kyle Carrozza	
Ms. Nowhere	Fast & Furious Spy Racers	2019-2021	Renee Elise Goldsberry	Tim Hedrick	
Ms. Nowhere	Fast & Furious Spy Racers	2019-2021	Renee Elise Goldsberry	Bret Haaland	
Mindy Oakland	Teen Titans Go!	2013-	Tara Strong	Michael Jelenic	
Mindy Oakland	Teen Titans Go!	2013-	Tara Strong	Aaron Horvath	
Ocoho	Radiant	2018-2020	Mai Fuchigami	Tony Valente	
Ocoho	Radiant	2018-2020	Alle Mims	Tony Valente	
Odin	Cannon Busters	2019	Darien Sills-Evans	LeSean Thomas	
Mallory O'Neill	Be Cool, Scooby-Doo!	2015-2018	Kimberly Brooks	Shaunt Nigoghossian	
Mallory O'Neill	Be Cool, Scooby-Doo!	2015-2018	Kimberly Brooks	Jeff Mednikow	
Mallory O'Neill	Be Cool, Scooby-Doo!	2015-2018	Kimberly Brooks	Andy Thom	
Mallory O'Neill	Be Cool, Scooby-Doo!	2015-2018	Kimberly Brooks	James Krenzke	
Mallory O'Neill	Be Cool, Scooby-Doo!	2015-2018	Kimberly Brooks	Ron Rubio	
Aran Ojiro	Haikyu!!	2014–2020	Jun Kasama	Haruichi Furudate	
"Green Poncho" Omar	Craig of the Creek	2018-2024	Zeno Robinson	Matt Burnett	
"Green Poncho" Omar	Craig of the Creek	2018-2024	Zeno Robinson	Ben Levin	
Biz O'Neill	Cop Craft	2019	Wataru Takagi	Shoji Gatoh	
Biz O'Neill	Cop Craft	2019	Christopher Dontrell Piper	Shoji Gatoh	
Onyankopon	Attack on Titan	2013–2023	Zeno Robinson	Hajime Isayama	
Orange Blossom	Strawberry Shortcake's Berry Bitty Adventures	2010–2015	Janyse Jaud	Bob Hathcock	
Patrick	Blood Blockade Battlefront	2015	Major Attaway	Yasuhiro Nightow	
Patrick	Blood Blockade Battlefront	2015	Unshō Ishizuka	Yasuhiro Nightow	
Phil	3Below: Tales of Arcadia	2018–2019	Guillermo del Toro	J. B. Smoove	
Philly the Kid	Cannon Busters	2019	Ayahi Takagaki	LeSean Thomas	
Black Lightning / Jefferson Pierce	Young Justice	2010-2022	Kevin Michael Richardson	Brandon Vietti	
Black Lightning / Jefferson Pierce	Young Justice	2010-2022	Kevin Michael Richardson	Greg Weisman	
Anissa Pierce	Young Justice	2010-2022	Masasa Moyo	Greg Weisman	
Pinky's Mom	Pinky Malinky	2019	Marietta Sirleaf	Chris Garbutt	
Pinky's Mom	Pinky Malinky	2019	Marietta Sirleaf	Rikke Asbjoern	
Jenny Pizza	Steven Universe (Note: Also reappeared in Steven Universe Future)	2013-2020	Reagan Gomez-Preston	Rebecca Sugar	
Kiki Pizza	Steven Universe	2013-2020	Reagan Gomez-Preston	Rebecca Sugar	
Kofi Pizza	Steven Universe	2013-2020	Godfrey Danchimah	Rebecca Sugar	
Nanefua Pizza	Steven Universe	2013-2020	Toks Olagundoye	Rebecca Sugar	
Pietro Polendina	RWBY	2013-	Dave Fennoy	Monty Oum	
Poppy	Twinkle Toes Lights Up New York	2016	Marieve Herington	John Massé	
Mayor Primshell	The Rocketeer	2019–2020	Kevin Michael Richardson	Nicole Dubuc	
Captain Quaid	Rapunzel's Tangled Adventure	2017-2020	Reg E. Cathey	Chris Sonnenburg	
Captain Quaid	Rapunzel's Tangled Adventure	2017-2020	Reg E. Cathey	Shane Prigmore	
Rayon	Motorcity	2012–2013	Bumper Robinson	David Bickel	
Reina	Danger & Eggs	2017	Jasika Nicole	Shadi Petosky	
Remy	Big City Greens	2018-	Zeno Robinson	Chris Houghton	
Remy	Big City Greens	2018-	Shane Houghton	Chris Houghton	
Robbie Robertson	The Avengers: Earth's Mightiest Heroes	2010-2012	Troy Baker	Ciro Nieli	
Robbie Robertson	The Avengers: Earth's Mightiest Heroes	2010-2012	Troy Baker	Joshua Fine	
Robbie Robertson	The Avengers: Earth's Mightiest Heroes	2010-2012	Troy Baker	Christopher Yost	
Robbie Robertson	Spider-Man	2017–2020	Ernie Hudson	Kevin Shinick	
Rock Lock (Ken Takagi)	My Hero Academia	2016-	Yasuhiro	Kōhei Horikoshi	
Rock Lock (Ken Takagi)	My Hero Academia	2016-	Gabe Kunda	Kōhei Horikoshi	
Rocket / Raquel Ervin	Young Justice	2010-2022	Kevin Michael Richardson	Brandon Vietti	
Rocket / Raquel Ervin	Young Justice	2010-2022	Kevin Michael Richardson	Greg Weisman	
Jason Rusch / Firestorm	Batman: The Brave and the Bold	2010	Tyler James Williams	Ben Jones	
Jason Rusch / Firestorm	Justice League: Crisis on Two Earths	2010	Cedric Yarbrough	Sam Liu	
Jason Rusch / Firestorm	Justice League: Crisis on Two Earths	2010	Cedric Yarbrough	Lauren Montgomery	
Jason Rusch / Firestorm	Justice League: Crisis on Two Earths	2010	Cedric Yarbrough	Dwayne McDuffie	
Jason Rusch / Firestorm	Lego DC Comics Super Heroes: The Flash	2018	Phil LaMarr	Ethan Spaulding	
Jason Rusch / Firestorm	Lego DC Comics Super Heroes: The Flash	2018	Phil LaMarr	Jim Krieg	
Jason Rusch / Firestorm	Lego DC Comics Super Heroes: The Flash	2018	Phil LaMarr	Jeremy Adams	
Desmond Rutaganda	Psycho-Pass: The Movie	2015	Unsho Ishikuza	Production I.G	
Desmond Rutaganda	Psycho-Pass: The Movie	2015	Major Attaway	Production I.G	
Tam Ryvora	Star Wars Resistance	2016–2018	Suzie McGrath	Dave Filoni	
Salem	Fast & Furious Spy Racers	2019-2021	Adetokumboh M'Cormack	Tim Hedrick	
Salem	Fast & Furious Spy Racers	2019-2021	Adetokumboh M'Cormack	Bret Haaland	
Sam	Cannon Busters	2019	Kamali Minter	LeSean Thomas	
Sasha	Bratz	2015	Shondalia White	MGA Entertainment	
Olympia Savage	Young Justice	2010-2022	Zeno Robinson	Brandon Vietti	
Olympia Savage	Young Justice	2010-2022	Zeno Robinson	Greg Weisman	
Darci Scott	Trollhunters: Tales of Arcadia	2016–2018	Yara Shahidi	Guillermo del Toro	
Darci Scott	3Below: Tales of Arcadia	2018–2019	Yara Shahidi	Guillermo del Toro	
Detective Louis Scott	Trollhunters: Tales of Arcadia	2016–2018	Ike Amadi	Guillermo del Toro	
Detective Louis Scott	3Below: Tales of Arcadia	2018–2019	Ike Amadi	Guillermo del Toro	
Nathan Seymour (Fire Emblem)	Tiger & Bunny	2011	Kenjiro Tsuda	Keiichi Sato	
Nathan Seymour (Fire Emblem)	Tiger & Bunny	2011	Kenjiro Tsuda	John Eric Bentley	
Shep	Steven Universe Future	2019–2020	Indya Moore	Rebecca Sugar	
Nadir Shiko	RWBY	2013-	Eiji Takeuchi	Monty Oum	
Shout	Fresh Beat Band of Spies	2015-2016	Thomas Hobson	Nadine van der Velde	
Shout	Fresh Beat Band of Spies	2015-2016	Thomas Hobson	Scott Kraft	
Shuri	Black Panther	2010	Kerry Washington	Reginald Hudlin	
Shuri	Avengers Assemble	2013-2019	Kimberly Brooks	Man of Action	
Shuri	Avengers Assemble	2013-2019	Daisy Lightfoot	Marvel Animation	
Herbert Sims	Neo Yokio	2017–2018	Unknown	Ezra Koenig	
Brian Simmons	Tyler Perry's Madea's Tough Love	2015	Tyler Perry	Frank Marino	
Joe Simmons	Tyler Perry's Madea's Tough Love	2015	Tyler Perry	Frank Marino	
Sophie	Pinky Malinky	2019	Kimberly Brooks	Chris Garbutt	
Sophie	Pinky Malinky	2019	Kimberly Brooks	Rikke Asbjoern	
Harold Smiley	Steven Universe	2013-2020	Sinbad	Rebecca Sugar	
Harold Smiley	Steven Universe	2013-2020	Colton Dunn	Rebecca Sugar	
Sydney Skelley	Ready Jet Go!	2016-2019	Dalila Bela	Craig Bartlett	
Sydney Skelley	Ready Jet Go!	2016-2019	Vienna Leacock	Craig Bartlett	
Roy Stallion	RWBY	2013-	N/A	Monty Oum	
Carole Stanley	Carole and Tuesday	2019–2020	Miyuri Shimabukuro	Shinichirō Watanabe	
Mayor Ron Starlin	Scooby-Doo! Mask of the Blue Falcon	2013	Kevin Michael Richardson	Michael Goguen	
Lynn Stewart-Pierce	Young Justice	2010-2022	Denise Boutte	Brandon Vietti	
Lynn Stewart-Pierce	Young Justice	2010-2022	Denise Boutte	Greg Weisman	
Silas Stone	Young Justice	2010-2022	Khary Payton	Brandon Vietti	
Silas Stone	Young Justice	2010-2022	Khary Payton	Greg Weisman	
Storm	X-Men	2011	Aya Hisakawa	Fuminori Kizaki	
Storm	X-Men	2011	Aya Hisakawa	Danielle Nicolet	
Storm	Black Panther	2010	Jill Scott	Reginald Hudlin	
Storm	Marvel Disk Wars: The Avengers	2014	Yayoi Sugaya	Toshiaki Komura	
Lance Strongbow	Rapunzel's Tangled Adventure	2017-2020	James Monroe Iglehart	Chris Sonnenburg	
Lance Strongbow	Rapunzel's Tangled Adventure	2017-2020	James Monroe Iglehart	Shane Prigmore	
Sunfire Queen	The Dragon Prince	2018-2024	Brenda M Crichlow	Aaron Ehasz	
Sunfire Queen	The Dragon Prince	2018-2024	Brenda M Crichlow	Justin Richmond	
Emerald Sustrai	RWBY	2013-	Katie Newville	Monty Oum	
Syrena	Cannon Busters	2019	Ayahi Takagaki	LeSean Thomas	
Makoto "Uribo" Tachiuri	Okko's Inn	2018	Satsumi Matsuda	Hiroko Reijō	
Queen Tara	Epic	2013	Beyoncé	Chris Wedge	
Mister Terrific	Justice League Action	2016-2018	Jim Krieg	Hannibal Buress	
Mister Terrific	Justice League Action	2016-2018	Butch Lukic		
Mister Terrific	Justice League Action	2016-2018	Alan Burnett		
Mister Terrific	Freedom Fighters: The Ray	2017-2018	Megalyn Echikunwoke	Echo Kellum	
Mister Terrific	Freedom Fighters: The Ray	2017-2018	Megalyn Echikunwoke	Marc Guggenheim	
Mister Terrific	Justice League vs. the Fatal Five	2019	Sam Liu	Kevin Michael Richardson	
Miss Theodora	Twinkle Toes	2012	Billy Myers	Dave Woodgate	
Ron Troupe	Superman: Unbound	2013	Michael-Leon Wooley	James Tucker	
Ron Troupe	Superman: Unbound	2013	Michael-Leon Wooley	Alan Burnett	
Varys Truss	Promare	2019	Hiroyuki Imaishi	John Eric Bentley	
Varys Truss	Promare	2019	Hiroyuki Imaishi	Tetsu Inada	
Gratuity "Tip" Tucci	Home	2015	Rihanna	Adam Rex	
Gratuity "Tip" Tucci	Home: Adventures with Tip & Oh	2016-2018	Rachel Crow	Ryan Crego	
Gratuity "Tip" Tucci	Home: Adventures with Tip & Oh	2016-2018	Rachel Crow	Thurop Van Orman	
Marcus Underwood	Milo Murphy's Law	2016-2019	Phil LaMarr	Dan Povenmire	
Marcus Underwood	Milo Murphy's Law	2016-2019	Phil LaMarr	Jeff "Swampy" Marsh	
Zack Underwood	Milo Murphy's Law	2016-2019	Mekai Curtis	Jeff "Swampy" Marsh	
Valkyrie	Guardians of the Galaxy	2015–2019	Raven Symone	Marty Isenberg	
Vince	Voltron Force	2011–2012	Doron Bell Jr	Todd Garfield	
Amanda Waller	Young Justice	2010-2022	Sheryl Lee Ralph	Brandon Vietti	
Amanda Waller	Young Justice	2010-2022	Sheryl Lee Ralph	Greg Weisman	
Amanda Waller	Batman: Assault on Arkham	2014	CCH Pounder	Jay Oliva	
Amanda Waller	Batman: Assault on Arkham	2014	CCH Pounder	Ethan Spaulding	
Amanda Waller	Suicide Squad: Hell to Pay	2018	Vanessa Williams	Sam Liu	
Amanda Waller	Batman: Hush	2019	Vanessa Williams	Justin Copeland .	
Amanda Waller	Justice League: Gods and Monsters	2015	Penny Johnson Jerald	Sam Liu	
Amanda Waller	Justice League: Gods and Monsters Chronicles	2015	Penny Johnson Jerald	Sam Liu	
Amanda Waller	Justice League: Gods and Monsters Chronicles	2015	Penny Johnson Jerald	Bruce Timm	
Amanda Waller	Justice League: Gods and Monsters Chronicles	2015	Penny Johnson Jerald	Alan Burnett	
Amanda Waller	DC Super Hero Girls: Legends of Atlantis	2018	Yvette Nicole Brown	Cecilia Aranovich	
Amanda Waller	DC Super Hero Girls: Legends of Atlantis	2018	Yvette Nicole Brown	Ian Hamilton	
Amanda Waller	Lego DC Super Hero Girls: Super-Villain High	2018	Yvette Nicole Brown	Elsa Garagarza	
Amanda Waller	DC Super Hero Girls: Intergalactic Games	2017	Yvette Nicole Brown	Cecilia Aranovich	
Amanda Waller	DC Super Hero Girls: Hero of the Year	2016	Yvette Nicole Brown	Cecilia Aranovich	
Amanda Waller	DC Super Hero Girls	2015–2018	Yvette Nicole Brown	Unknown	
Erica Wang	The Epic Tales of Captain Underpants	2018–2019	Zoe Hendrix	Dav Pilkey	
Wheels	Tyler Perry's Madea's Tough Love	2015	Caitlyn Taylor Love	Frank Marino	
Bernard Williams	Craig of the Creek	2018-2024	Phil LaMarr	Matt Burnett	
Bernard Williams	Craig of the Creek	2018-2024	Phil LaMarr	Ben Levin	
Craig Williams	Craig of the Creek	2018-2024	Philip Solomon	Ben Levin	
Jessica Williams	Craig of the Creek	2018-2024	Lucia Cunningham	Ben Levin	
Mr. X	Amphibia	2019–2022	RuPaul	Matt Braly	
King Xavier	Craig of the Creek	2018–2024	Charles Dewayne	Ben Levin	
Nils Yajima (Nils Nielsen)	Gundam Build Fighters Try	2014-2015	Shinnosuke Tachibana	Yoshiyuki Tomino	
Nils Yajima (Nils Nielsen)	Gundam Build Fighters Try	2014-2015	Mitchell Wallace	Yoshiyuki Tomino	
Jarek Yeager	Star Wars Resistance	2016–2018	Scott Lawrence	Dave Filoni	
Angela Young	Hair Love	2019	Issa Rae	Matthew A. Cherry	
Zeek	Pinky Malinky	2019	Grey DeLisle	Chris Garbutt	
Zeek	Pinky Malinky	2019	Grey DeLisle	Rikke Asbjoern	
Ziri	Fast & Furious Spy Racers	2019-2021	Jamaal Hepburn	Tim Hedrick	
Ziri	Fast & Furious Spy Racers	2019-2021	Jamaal Hepburn	Bret Haaland	

== See also ==
- List of black animated characters: 1990s
- List of black animated characters: 2000s
- List of black animated characters: 2020s
- African characters in comics
- Ethnic stereotypes in comics
- List of black superheroes
- List of black video game characters
