= John Massé =

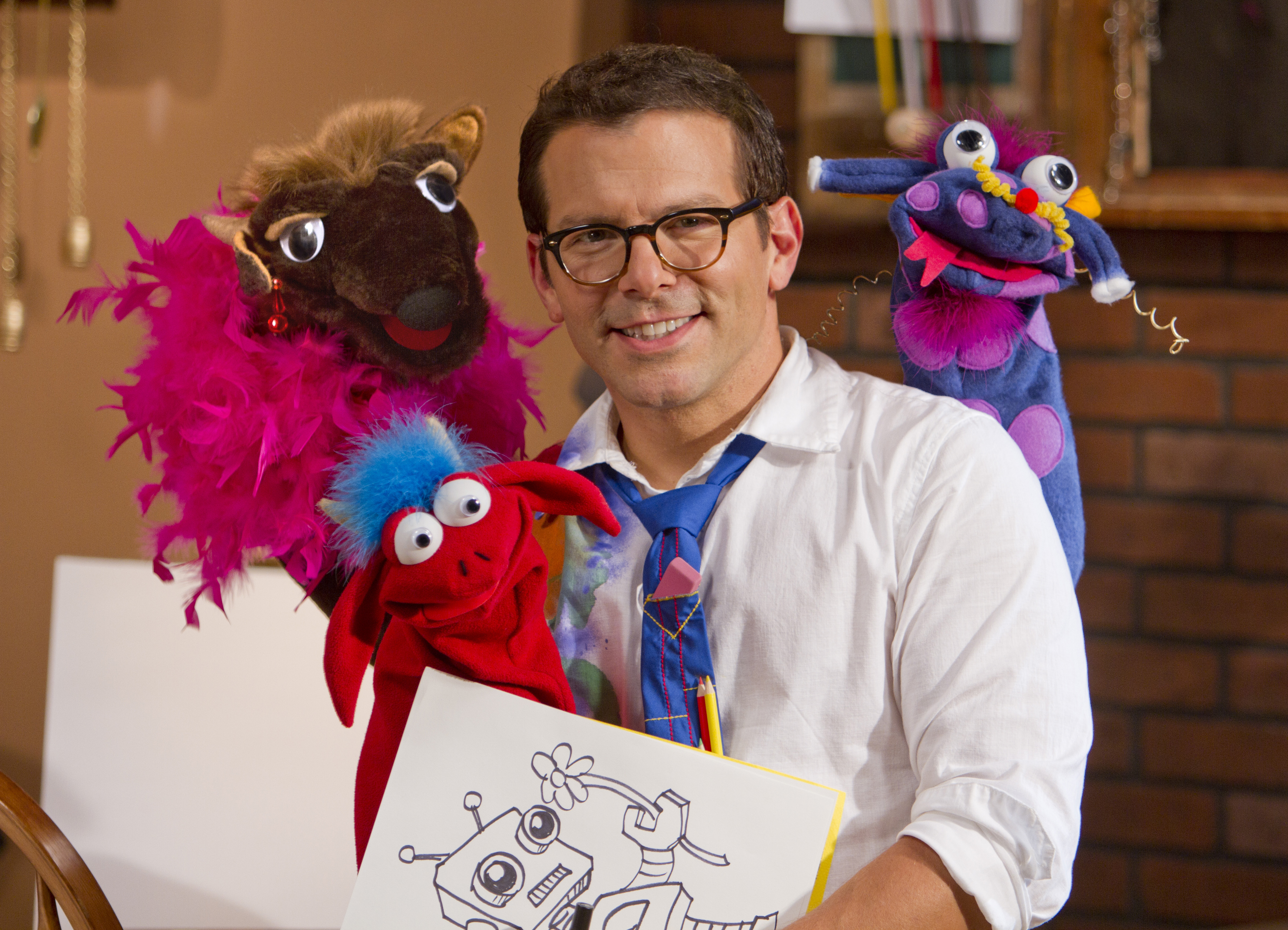
- John Massé as Muffalo Potato
- Born: December 19, 1969 (age 56)
- Occupations: Creative director, animator, producer

YouTube information
- Channel: Muffalo Potato
- Years active: 2013–present
- Subscribers: 171K
- Views: 37M
- Last updated: January 6, 2023

John Massé (born December 19, 1969) is an American creative director, animator, composer, content creator, voice over artist and producer. Massé is perhaps best known as the creator and host of the online drawing program Muffalo Potato.

== Early life ==
Born in New York City, and eventually moving with his family to settle in Kenmore, New York (a suburb of Buffalo), John learned to illustrate under the tutelage of his father, Jean Massé, a Clio-winning illustrator who created the Moosehead Beer logo. At the age of 19, the younger Massé showed signs of following in his father's footsteps when he started painting murals. Referencing his work, Massé was quoted as saying "Hey, I can make a living doing something I absolutely love!"

== Career ==
After moving to Las Vegas from Buffalo, John Massé worked for several advertising firms there as an illustrator and concept creator. While in Las Vegas, Massé eventually began working for Franco Dragone, creator and director of Le Reve at Wynn Las Vegas. For Dragone, Massé worked as an illustrator and also conceptualized scenic visuals for The House of Dancing Water.

== Works ==
=== Character designs, comic books and television commercials ===
Massé moved to Los Angeles and found his way in to commercial production. He created the characters of Kewl Breeze, Z Strap, Elastika, Twinkle Toes, Bella Ballerina, Luminators, Pretty Tall, Sporty Shorty, Punkie Rose, Hydee Hytop, and Caligear for Skechers USA's television commercials and comic books. Massé performs a great deal of voice and jingle writing work in the commercials he produces. He also created and produced live-action commercials for Skechers USA that included the Skechers Shape-ups commercial airing nationally during Super Bowl XLVI in 2010.

=== Television and animated movies ===
Massé was the creator and co-producer of the Nicktoons television series Zevo-3. The series was based on the characters he created. He was also the co-executive producer and creator of Shmitty, McFunkle and Stump airing on Comedy Central in the summer of 2010. For Skechers Entertainment, Massé was the co-executive producer of the animated movie Hydee and the Hytops. The animated movie Twinkle Toes was based on characters created by Massé and is distributed by Universal Pictures.

=== Muffalo Potato ===
In 2013, Massé created the family drawing show Muffalo Potato on YouTube. With over 250 episodes geared towards children ages 5 to 12, John and puppet Muffalo teach viewers how to create illustrations using various numbers and letters, from animals and emojis to cartoon characters from works including Marvel, Star Wars, Disney and video games. In 2016, the drawing show was adapted for Royal Caribbean with special episodes geared toward their fleet-wide Adventure Ocean program.
