= List of Tales of Arcadia cast members =

Tales of Arcadia is a trilogy of American computer-animated science fantasy television series created for Netflix by Guillermo del Toro and produced by DreamWorks Animation and Double Dare You. It follows the inhabitants of the small suburban town of Arcadia Oaks, which is secretly home to various supernatural creatures and the teenage heroes who fight against the forces of evil that lurk in the shadows.

The following is a list of cast members who have appeared.

== Cast and characters ==
Character	Television series			Video game	Feature film
Character	Trollhunters	3Below	Wizards	Trollhunters: Defenders of Arcadia	Rise of the Titans
Character	2016–2018	2018–2019	2020	2020	2021
=== Introduced in Trollhunters === ==== (part 1) ====
AAARRRGGHH!!! / Aarghaumont	Fred Tatasciore	Fred Tatasciore	Fred Tatasciore	Fred Tatasciore	Fred Tatasciore
Bagwella	Fred Tatasciore		Fred Tatasciore	Fred Tatasciore	
Officer Brennan	Tom Kenny	Tom Kenny	Tom Kenny		
Bular the Butcher	Ron Perlman		Darin De Paul		
Gnome Chompsky	Rodrigo Blaas	Rodrigo Blaas	Rodrigo Blaas	Rodrigo Blaas	
Nancy Domzalski	Laraine Newman	Laraine Newman			
Tobias "Toby" Domzalski	Charlie Saxton	Charlie Saxton	Charlie Saxton	Charlie Saxton	Charlie Saxton
Draal the Deadly	Matthew Waterson		Matthew Waterson		
Goblins	Frank Welker				
Blinkous "Blinky" Galadrigal	Kelsey Grammer	Kelsey Grammer	Kelsey Grammer	Fred Tatasciore	Kelsey Grammer
Gatto	Fred Tatasciore		Fred Tatasciore		
Gladys Groe	Melanie Paxson				
Gunmar the Skullcrusher	Clancy Brown		Clancy Brown	Fred Tatasciore	
Gut	Tom Kenny			Tom Kenny	
Lenora Janeth	Laraine Newman	Laraine Newman			Laraine Newman
Seamus Johnson	Steve Alterman	Steve Alterman			
Kanjigar the Courageous	Tom Hiddleston (part 1, episode 1); James Purefoy	James Purefoy			
Doctor Barbara Lake	Amy Landecker				Amy Landecker
James "Jim" Lake Junior	Anton Yelchin (part 1-3); Emile Hirsch (part 3)	Emile Hirsch	Emile Hirsch	Emile Hirsch	Emile Hirsch
Coach Lawrence	Thomas F. Wilson	Thomas F. Wilson	Thomas F. Wilson		Thomas F. Wilson
Shannon Longhannon	Bebe Wood	Bebe Wood	Bebe Wood		Bebe Wood
Doctor Mario Muelas	Guillermo del Toro	Guillermo del Toro			
Zelda Nomura	Lauren Tom				Lauren Tom
NotEnrique	Jimmie Wood	Jimmie Wood	Jimmie Wood	Tom Kenny	
Claire Nuñez	Lexi Medrano	Lexi Medrano	Lexi Medrano	Lexi Medrano	Lexi Medrano
Javier Nuñez	Tom Kenny				Tom Kenny
Councilwoman Ophilia Nuñez	Andrea Navedo	Andrea Navedo			Andrea Navedo
Steve Palchuk	Steven Yeun	Steven Yeun	Steven Yeun		Steven Yeun
Elijah Leslie "Eli" Pepperjack	Cole Sand	Cole Sand			Cole Sand
Rot	Brook Chalmers				
Angor Rot	Ike Amadi		Ike Amadi	Ike Amadi	
Otto Scaarbach	Tom Kenny				
Darci Scott	Yara Shahidi	Yara Shahidi			
Walter Strickler / Waltolomew Stricklander	Jonathan Hyde	Jonathan Hyde			Jonathan Hyde
Señor Karl Uhl	Fred Tatasciore	Fred Tatasciore			
Queen Usurna	Anjelica Huston				
Vendel	Victor Raider-Wexler	Victor Raider-Wexler	Victor Raider-Wexler	Fred Tatasciore	
Mary Wang	Lauren Tom	Lauren Tom			
Queen Wumpa	Grey Griffin				
==== (part 2) ====
Merlin Ambrosius	David Bradley		David Bradley		
Bork		Grey Griffin			
Dictatious Galadrigal	Mark Hamill		Mark Hamill		
Morgana le Fay / Pale Lady	Lena Headey		Lena Headey	Yvonne Angulo	
==== (part 3) ====
Hisirdoux "Douxie" Casperan	Colin O'Donoghue	Colin O'Donoghue	Colin O'Donoghue	Colin O'Donoghue	Colin O'Donoghue
Mister Hammes	Chad Hammes	Chad Hammes			
Detective Louis Scott	Ike Amadi	Ike Amadi		Ike Amadi	
Princess Aja Tarron	Tatiana Maslany	Tatiana Maslany		Tatiana Maslany	Tatiana Maslany
Prince Krel Tarron	Diego Luna	Diego Luna	Diego Luna	Sebastian Lopez Hinton	Diego Luna
Victoria	Grey Griffin				
=== Introduced in 3Below === ==== (part 1) ====
Sargeant Costas		Oscar Nunez			
Dadblank / Ricky Blank		Tom Kenny	Tom Kenny		Tom Kenny
Foo-Foos		Tom Kenny			
Halcon / Bertha Flanagan		Fiona Shaw			
Jerry		Reginald VelJohnson			
Colonel Kubritz		Uzo Aduba			
Luug		Frank Welker		Frank Welker	
Momblank / Lucy Blank		Cheryl Hines		Cheryl Hines	Cheryl Hines
General Val Morando		Alon Aboutboul			
Mothership "Mother"		Glenn Close			
Neb		Fred Tatasciore			
Phil		J. B. Smoove			
Loth Saborian		Chris Obi			
Stuart of Durio		Nick Frost			Nick Frost
Queen Coranda Tarron		Tatiana Maslany			
King Fialkov Tarron		Andy Garcia			
Commander Varvatos Vex		Nick Offerman			Nick Offerman
Lieutenant Zadra		Hayley Atwell			
Zoe		Sandra Saad	Sandra Saad		
Zeron Alpha		Darin De Paul			
Zeron Omega		Ann Dowd			
==== (part 2) ====
Archibald / Archie		Alfred Molina	Alfred Molina		Alfred Molina
Gwendolyn of Gorbon		Kathleen Turner			
Tronos Madu		Danny Trejo			
Magmatron		Fred Tatasciore			
=== Introduced in Wizards ===
Bellroc			Kay Bess; Piotr Michael		Kay Bess; Piotr Michael
Callista / Deya the Deliverer			Stephanie Beatriz		
Charlemagne			Brian Blessed		Brian Blessed
Sir Galahad			John Rhys-Davies		
Sir Lancelot			Rupert Penry-Jones		
Nari			Angel Lin		Angel Lin
Nimue / Lady of the Lake			Stephanie Beatriz		
King Arthur Pendragon / Green Knight			James Faulkner		
Skrael			Piotr Michael		Piotr Michael
=== Introduced in Trollhunters: Rise of the Titans ===
Zong Shi					James Hong

== See also ==
- List of Tales of Arcadia characters
