= Karl Müller (inventor) =

Swiss engineer and businessman (born 1952)

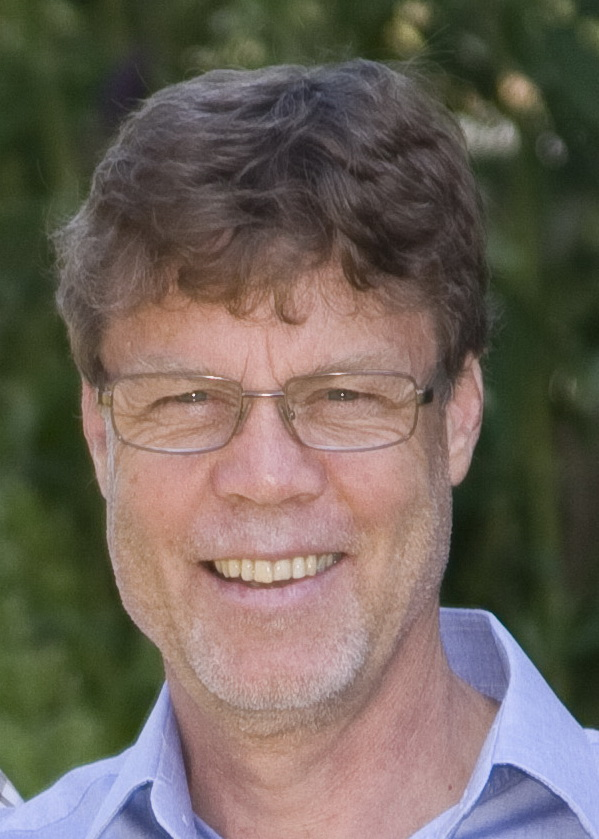
- Müller in 2010
- Born: 1952 (age 73–74); Roggwil, Thurgau, Switzerland
- Known for: Masai Barefoot Technology

Karl Müller (born 1952) is a Swiss engineer and businessman. He is the creator of the Masai Barefoot Technology (MBT) brand of rocker bottom shoes, and he holds a patent on the design.

Müller founded Swiss Masai (now known as Masai Marketing and Trading AG) in 1996 to market his new shoe concept. In 2007, he left the company on amicable terms and went on to found Kybun Corporation to market a newer "walk-on-air" shoe concept.
