= List of DC Super Hero Girls (web series) episodes =

DC Super Hero Girls is an American animated web series based on the DC Comics universe.

== Series overview ==
Series	Episodes	Originally released	
Series	Episodes	First released	Last released
1	13	1 October 2015	25 February 2016
2	26	21 April 2016	12 January 2017
3	26	26 January 2017	30 November 2017
4	24	18 January 2018	28 June 2018
5	23	2 August 2018	27 December 2018

== Episodes ==
=== Season 1 (2015–16) ===
No. overall	No. in season	Title	Directed by	Written by	Original release date
1	1	"Welcome to Super Hero High"	Jennifer Coyle	Shea Fontana	1 October 2015
An introduction to Super Hero High and its students.
2	2	"All About Super Hero High"	Jennifer Coyle	Shea Fontana	9 October 2015
Bumblebee gives the new transfer student, Wonder Woman, a tour of campus.
3	3	"Roomies"	Jennifer Coyle	Shea Fontana	9 October 2015
Wonder Woman settles into her dorm as Harley Quinn, her roommate, tries to get her attention.
4	4	"Crazy Quiltin'"	Jennifer Coyle	Shea Fontana	22 October 2015
Wonder Woman begins her first assignment of the semester; designing a super suit.
5	5	"Power Outage"	Jennifer Coyle	Shea Fontana	6 November 2015
Wonder Woman begins her next assignment of the semester, which is flight.
6	6	"Fall Into Super Hero High"	Jennifer Coyle	Shea Fontana	20 November 2015
Harley Quinn has organised a movie night, premiering a compilation of footage starring the girls.
7	7	"Hero of the Month: Poison Ivy"	Jennifer Coyle	Shea Fontana	3 December 2015
Poison Ivy not only has rescued classmates, friends and strangers, but she is stopped from getting worse in sticky situations.
8	8	"Designing Disaster"	Jennifer Coyle	Shea Fontana	17 December 2015
Wonder Woman finally gets a chance to put her self-designed super suit to the test, but she must get super results while trying it out.
9	9	"Weaponomics"	Jennifer Coyle	Shea Fontana	22 December 2015
Wonder Woman knows her weaponomics, but someone doesn't want her teacher to know.
10	10	"Clubbing"	Jennifer Coyle	Shea Fontana	14 January 2016
Poison Ivy wants to go at clubs, but she has a trouble in choosing it at Super Hero High School.
11	11	"Hero of the Month: Bumblebee"	Jennifer Coyle	Shea Fontana	28 January 2016
Bumblebee goes to test her skills and lessons in Super Hero High School.
12	12	"Saving the Day"	Jennifer Coyle	Shea Fontana	11 February 2016
The semester for Super Hero High students ended, but A Save the Day alarm has sounded and they must fly to the rescue.
13	13	"Hero of the Month: Wonder Woman"	Jennifer Coyle	Shea Fontana	25 February 2016
Wonder Woman is best known for being a leader and a great friend, which is the reason that she is nominated in the school for Hero of the Month.

=== Season 2 (2016–17) ===
No. overall	No. in season	Title	Directed by	Written by	Original release date
14	1	"New Beginnings"	Cecilia Aranovich Hamilton	Shea Fontana	21 April 2016
As the newly appointed School Ambassador, Wonder Woman is taking the lead to recruit Supergirl to Super Hero High – until a sneak attack from Giganta catches her off guard.
15	2	"Hero of the Month: Supergirl"	Cecilia Aranovich Hamilton	Shea Fontana	5 May 2016
Supergirl tries to adjust in Super Hero High, but soon becomes a big hit.
16	3	"Batgirl vs. Supergirl"	Cecilia Aranovich Hamilton	Nina Bargiel	19 May 2016
Batgirl and Supergirl face-off in their battle: the last piece of superfood cake.
17	4	"Quinn-tessential Harley"	Cecilia Aranovich Hamilton	Nina Bargiel	2 June 2016
Harley Quinn's video blog has gone viral and she has the responsibility of being a super hero and a celebrity.
18	5	"Hero of the Month: Harley Quinn"	Cecilia Aranovich Hamilton	Shea Fontana	16 June 2016
Harley Quinn becomes the Hero of the Month as she saves the day in crazy ways and laughs in the face of danger.
19	6	"License to Fly"	Cecilia Aranovich Hamilton	Nina Bargiel	30 June 2016
The Batjet is ready for lift-off, but first Batgirl must maneuver her way through the Flyer's Ed test.
20	7	"Hero of the Month: Batgirl"	Cecilia Aranovich Hamilton	Shea Fontana	14 July 2016
Batgirl becomes a resident computer genius at Super Hero High and can solve problems faster than a calculator.
21	8	"Doubles Trouble"	Cecilia Aranovich Hamilton	Nina Bargiel	28 July 2016
Katana chooses Supergirl as her tennis doubles partner, but Supergirl's powers are too much for the game.
22	9	"Franken-Ivy"	Cecilia Aranovich Hamilton	Nina Bargiel	9 August 2016
Poison Ivy's new plant is growing faster than anyone expected, forcing DC Super Hero Girls stop it from taking over Metropolis.
23	10	"Hero of the Month: Katana"	Cecilia Aranovich Hamilton	Shea Fontana	11 August 2016
Katana - an expert swords-woman - becomes the newest Hero of the Month.
24	11	"Dude, Where's My Invisible Jet?"	Cecilia Aranovich Hamilton	Nina Bargiel	25 August 2016
When Wonder Woman's Invisible Plane goes missing, her friends band together to form a search party.
25	12	"Hero of the Month: Frost"	Cecilia Aranovich Hamilton	Shea Fontana	6 September 2016
Whether it's fighting super villains or solving complex chemistry equations, Frost always keeps her cool.
26	13	"The Blunder Games"	Cecilia Aranovich Hamilton	Nina Bargiel	8 September 2016
As part of the Advanced Skills Survival class, Batgirl is dropped off in a remote island and must make it to the designated spot before sunset, but when her equipment malfunctions, Batgirl must rely on a different set of super skills.
27	14	"Hawkgirl's Day Off"	Cecilia Aranovich Hamilton	Nina Bargiel	22 September 2016
As a break from classes and hall monitoring, Hawkgirl's friends treat her to a relaxing day at the SuperSpa. The day takes a turn when Mrs. Clayface makes a surprise appearance.
28	15	"Hero of the Month: Hawkgirl"	Cecilia Aranovich Hamilton	Shea Fontana	4 October 2016
Hawkgirl is a serious force to be reckoned with: she's the best hall monitor at Super Hero High, a fearless defender of justice, and most of all, a loyal and loving friend.
29	16	"The Cheetah Who Cried Wolf"	Cecilia Aranovich Hamilton	Shea Fontana	10 October 2016
Overcome with jealousy, Cheetah tries to become Hero of the Month after a series of staged (and failed) attempts. When Solomon Grundy attacks, no one believes Cheetah and she must take on the villain herself.
30	17	"Ring of Mire"	Cecilia Aranovich Hamilton	Shea Fontana	20 October 2016
When Star Sapphire accidentally drops her Lantern ring down the sink, she dives into the sewer to find it — only to be greeted by Killer Croc.
31	18	"Hero of the Month: Star Sapphire"	Cecilia Aranovich Hamilton	Shea Fontana	1 November 2016
Star Sapphire graces the halls of Super Hero High with the perfect OOTD, but she also knows how to lay down the law with her powerful violet lantern ring.
32	19	"Ultimate Accessory"	Cecilia Aranovich Hamilton	Shea Fontana	3 November 2016
Bumblebee gets a pressure as she must design a high-tech accessory for her Weaponomics class.
33	20	"Riddle of the Heart"	Cecilia Aranovich Hamilton	Shea Fontana	17 November 2016
With her expert detective skills, Batgirl has been able to solve mysteries in the blink of an eye, but soon gets a series of new puzzling riddles.
34	21	"Hero of the Month: Cyborg and Starfire"	Cecilia Aranovich Hamilton	Shea Fontana	29 November 2016
Amanda Waller is naming two Heroes of the Month - Cyborg and Starfire. Their teamwork and friendship prove that superpowers are much better used together.
35	22	"Roomies Return: Frost's Bite"	Cecilia Aranovich Hamilton	Nina Bargiel	1 December 2016
When Frost can't find a way to warm up, she takes her bitter coldness out on her classmates.
36	23	"The Odd Couple"	Cecilia Aranovich Hamilton	Nina Bargiel	15 December 2016
Harley Quinn and Lady Shiva are paired up as partners for their Advanced Stakeout project. They are soon faced with the villain Cheshire and they must put their differences aside.
37	24	"Cold Blooded"	Cecilia Aranovich Hamilton	Shea Fontana	29 December 2016
Frost has a cold, and every sneeze starts a snow-storm. Without hesitation, Bumblebee, Batgirl and Poison Ivy does whatever it takes to save the day.
38	25	"Hero of the Month: Lady Shiva"	Cecilia Aranovich Hamilton	Shea Fontana	12 January 2017
Lady Shiva has been training to become a Hero of the Month.
39	26	"Hero of the Month: Beast Boy"	Cecilia Aranovich Hamilton	Shea Fontana	9 February 2017
Beast Boy is a new Hero of the Month. Whether he transforms into a ferocious crocodile or a friendly octopus, Beast Boy always saves the day in unexpected ways.

=== Season 3 (2017) ===
No. overall	No. in season	Title	Directed by	Written by	Original release date
40	1	"Batnapped"	Jennifer Coyle	Shea Fontana	26 January 2017
Batgirl is kidnapped by Killer Moth, who wants to make her his partner.
41	2	"Surprise"	Jennifer Coyle	Shea Fontana	2 February 2017
Harley Quinn enlists the help of Katana and Bumblebee in hiding a surprise birthday present for Batgirl in her dorm room. When they sneak into Batgirl's dorm, they are accosted by Batgirl's booby traps.
42	3	"Tales from the Kryptomites, Part 1"	Jennifer Coyle	Shea Fontana	16 February 2017
Lena Luthor uses the remnants of kryptonite from Supergirl's ship to create living kryptomites.
43	4	"Tales from the Kryptomites, Part 2"	Jennifer Coyle	Shea Fontana	23 February 2017
The supers must save Metropolis from the army of Kryptomites.
44	5	"Seeing Red"	Jennifer Coyle	Shea Fontana	2 March 2017
A red Kryptomite loose at Super Hero High brings out everyone's mean side except Starfire, who proves immune to it.
45	6	"Spring Prison Break"	Jennifer Coyle	Shea Fontana	9 March 2017
Frost reads her "How I Spent Spring Break" essay and the flashback shows how Katana and Frost formed Task Force X to stop Lashina from breaking the Female Furies out of Belle Reve. During the battle between the SHH Heroes and the Furies, Barda redeems herself and joins the side of the good guys.
46	7	"Around Metropolis in 80 Seconds"	Jennifer Coyle	Shea Fontana	16 March 2017
Wonder Woman and Supergirl are facing off to see who's fastest, but when they keep tying, they decide to race sans-superpowers. Harley hates to be left out and joins the race. As Wonder Woman and Supergirl zoom around Metropolis, they spot a bank robbery in progress and compete to see who can catch the criminals first. While they're distracted, Harley wins the race.
47	8	"For Art's Sake"	Jennifer Coyle	Shea Fontana	4 May 2017
It's the SHH Student Art Fundraiser and the Double Dare twins have stolen masterpiece from the show. It's up to Katana and Supergirl to stop them and recover the painting, but when Supergirl is knocked out by kryptonite and Katana's sword is stolen, Katana must improvise and use her art supplies to defeat the Double Dares.
48	9	"Wildside, Part 1"	Jennifer Coyle	Shea Fontana	11 May 2017
Batgirl, Beast Boy and Starfire are picnicking in the park when Lion-Mane's menagerie of entranced animals attack the park. The heroes must save the citizens and stop Lion-Mane.
49	10	"Wildside, Part 2"	Jennifer Coyle	Shea Fontana	18 May 2017
With Lion-Mane subdued, Batgirl, Starfire, and Beast Boy must find all the escaped zoo animals and return them to the zoo.
50	11	"Day of Fun-Ship"	Brandon McKinney	Shea Fontana	1 June 2017
During their sisterly "day of fun-ship", Starfire and Blackfire must protect the zoo from King Shark. The sisters realize they have more in common than they thought.
51	12	"The Ares Up There"	Brandon McKinney	Shea Fontana	8 June 2017
When Wonder Woman is home for a holiday, Ares takes advantage and attacks her people.
52	13	"Stealth 101, Part 1"	Brandon McKinney	Shea Fontana	15 June 2017
Batgirl and Poison Ivy are partnered for Crazy Quilt's stealth suit design project.
53	14	"Stealth 101, Part 2"	Brandon McKinney	Shea Fontana	22 June 2017
Batgirl and Poison Ivy use their stealth suits to rescue Crazy Quilt from Killer Moth.
54	15	"A Fury Scorned"	Brandon McKinney	Shea Fontana	29 June 2017
Lashina breaks into Belle Reve and poisons Commissioner Gordon. Batgirl and Hawkgirl must find the antidote before it's too late.
55	16	"Body Electric"	Brandon McKinney	Shea Fontana	6 July 2017
Giganta causes an electric blackout and Batgirl enlists the help of Thunder and Lightning.
56	17	"Techless Tuesday"	Brandon McKinney	Shea Fontana	13 July 2017
Mrs. Clayface steals all of Batgirl's gadgets in an effort to break her husband out of Arkham.
57	18	"Fresh Ares, Part 1"	Brandon McKinney	Shea Fontana	20 July 2017
Peaced-out Ares comes to Metropolis to see Wonder Woman, but his peaceful outlook is ruined when Catwoman steals the amulet of Harmonia.
58	19	"Fresh Ares, Part 2"	Brandon McKinney	Shea Fontana	27 July 2017
As Ares rains destruction on Metropolis, the supers must recover the amulet of Harmonia.
59	20	"Fresh Ares, Part 3"	Brandon McKinney	Shea Fontana	3 August 2017
With Catwoman's help, the supers return the amulet of Harmonia to Ares and save the day.
60	21	"Gorilla Warfare"	Brandon McKinney	Shea Fontana	26 October 2017
The supers must save Gorilla Grodd when his former army comes to "rescue" him from Super Hero High.
61	22	"Fight Flub"	Brandon McKinney	Shea Fontana	2 November 2017
Katana and Big Barda try to prove their own fighting style is the best when the Double Dare Twins attack.
62	23	"Jetsetters"	Brandon McKinney	Shea Fontana	9 November 2017
Wonder Woman is trying to teach Frost how to fly the invisible jet so she can pass her flyers exam when Killer Moth attacks.
63	24	"New Perry-Spective"	Brandon McKinney	Shea Fontana	16 November 2017
Perry the Parademon is loose in Metropolis and the heroes are on the trail, but Big Barda has a soft spot for the parademon and takes him in as her new pet.
64	25	"Dog Day After School"	Brandon McKinney	Shea Fontana	23 November 2017
A Kryptonian is loose in Metropolis. After following the wake of destruction, Supergirl is reunited with Krypto the Superdog.
65	26	"It's A Superful Life"	Brandon McKinney	Shea Fontana	30 November 2017
The heroes want to make this an extra special holiday by brightening the lives of Metropolis citizens.

=== Season 4 (2018) ===
No. overall	No. in season	Title	Directed by	Written by	Original release date
66	1	"Ring Me Maybe, Part 1"	Cecilia Aranovich Hamilton & Ian Hamilton	Shea Fontana	18 January 2018
Green Lantern leaves Earth and joins the Green Lantern Corps, but Earth must be safe before a new Green Lantern is called.
67	2	"Ring Me Maybe, Part 2"	Cecilia Aranovich Hamilton & Ian Hamilton	Shea Fontana	25 January 2018
With Hal Jordan gone, Sinestro seizes the opportunity to attack Earth.
68	3	"Ring Me Maybe, Part 3"	Cecilia Aranovich Hamilton & Ian Hamilton	Shea Fontana	1 February 2018
Jessica Cruz has been chosen as Earth's new Green Lantern, but her fear keeps her from stopping Sinestro and embracing her powers.
69	4	"Ring Me Maybe, Part 4"	Cecilia Aranovich Hamilton & Ian Hamilton	Shea Fontana	8 February 2018
Jessica Cruz conquers her fears and faces Sinestro with help from her super hero friends.
70	5	"Fish Out of Water, Part 1"	Cecilia Aranovich Hamilton & Ian Hamilton	Shea Fontana	15 February 2018
Mera is having a hard time adjusting to her life at Super Hero High, but with the help of her new friends, Super Hero High will feel like home.
71	6	"Fish Out of Water, Part 2"	Cecilia Aranovich Hamilton & Ian Hamilton	Shea Fontana	22 February 2018
Mera must team up with Miss Martian to stop Firefly's rampage.
72	7	"Gone to the Dogs, Part 1"	Cecilia Aranovich Hamilton & Ian Hamilton	Shea Fontana	1 March 2018
Batgirl and Supergirl may be best friends, but their dogs Krypto and Ace are still getting to know each other. They must put aside their differences to help save the day.
73	8	"Gone to the Dogs, Part 2"	Cecilia Aranovich Hamilton & Ian Hamilton	Shea Fontana	8 March 2018
While Supergirl and Batgirl investigate a burglary, Krypto and Ace track the culprit and reclaim the loot.
74	9	"Pets Peeved, Part 1"	Cecilia Aranovich Hamilton & Ian Hamilton	Shea Fontana	15 March 2018
The Super Pets are on the verge of failing their first class at Super Hero High, but when the Animilitia traps the heroes, the Super Pets must prove their heroic mettle to save their owners.
75	10	"Pets Peeved, Part 2"	Cecilia Aranovich Hamilton & Ian Hamilton	Shea Fontana	22 March 2018
The Super Pets work together to save their owners and stop the Animilitia, proving they are a part of the Super Team.
76	11	"Ha-Ha Horticulture"	Cecilia Aranovich Hamilton & Ian Hamilton	Shea Fontana	29 March 2018
When Ivy's plant experiment goes awry and puts the whole school to sleep, it is up to her and Harley to find the antidote.
77	12	"Truth of the Lasso, Part 1"	Cecilia Aranovich Hamilton & Ian Hamilton	Shea Fontana	5 April 2018
Wonder Woman evades Cheetah's repeated attempts to steal her Lasso of Truth, but Wonder Woman loses her lasso during an encounter with Giganta.
78	13	"Truth of the Lasso, Part 2"	Cecilia Aranovich Hamilton & Ian Hamilton	Shea Fontana	12 April 2018
When Wonder Woman's lasso goes missing, the origin story of her lasso comes to light, which is also the origin story of Cheetah's powers.
79	14	"Truth of the Lasso, Part 3"	Cecilia Aranovich Hamilton & Ian Hamilton	Shea Fontana	19 April 2018
The Super Hero High kids are headed on a field trip, but their journey is cut short by Giganta's attack.
80	15	"Truth of the Lasso, Part 4"	Cecilia Aranovich Hamilton & Ian Hamilton	Shea Fontana	26 April 2018
Cheetah tries to get her revenge on Wonder Woman by using her own lasso against her, but Wonder Woman overcomes Cheetah's treachery.
81	16	"Nevermore, Part 1"	Cecilia Aranovich Hamilton & Ian Hamilton	Shea Fontana	3 May 2018
Trigon wants his daughter Raven to follow in his footsteps and rule the Underworld, but Raven isn't so sure.
82	17	"Nevermore, Part 2"	Cecilia Aranovich Hamilton & Ian Hamilton	Shea Fontana	10 May 2018
Raven helps save Metropolis after her portal causes an earthquake, and discovers she wants to study at Super Hero High.
83	18	"Nevermore, Part 3"	Cecilia Aranovich Hamilton & Ian Hamilton	Shea Fontana	17 May 2018
Trigon wreaks havoc on Super Hero High when he hears Raven wants to attend, and it is up to the Supers to stop him.
84	19	"Nevermore, Part 4"	Cecilia Aranovich Hamilton & Ian Hamilton	Shea Fontana	24 May 2018
Raven uses her magic to help stop her father Trigon, and might just convince him to let her stay at Super Hero High.
85	20	"Drive Me Crazy"	Cecilia Aranovich Hamilton & Ian Hamilton	Shea Fontana	31 May 2018
When Wonder Woman, Batgirl and Harley discover that Big Barda doesn't know how to drive, they set out to teach her.
86	21	"Tamaranean Dance Club, Part 1"	Cecilia Aranovich Hamilton & Ian Hamilton	Shea Fontana	7 June 2018
Starfire is homesick for a traditional Tamaranean dance so the Supers surprise her with one of their own.
87	22	"Tamaranean Dance Club, Part 2"	Cecilia Aranovich Hamilton & Ian Hamilton	Shea Fontana	14 June 2018
Starfire is feeling melancholy and homesick for the great dance of Tamaran. Supergirl, Katana and Wonder Woman organize a dance with Blackfire and the Korugar Academy kids, but "dance" in Tamaranean means something else entirely.
88	23	"Fly By Night"	Cecilia Aranovich Hamilton & Ian Hamilton	Shea Fontana	21 June 2018
To reclaim Wonder Woman's homework after curfew, Wonder Woman, Bumblebee and Hawkgirl must sneak by the teachers to get to the cafeteria where the project was left.
89	24	"By the Yearbook"	Cecilia Aranovich Hamilton & Ian Hamilton	Shea Fontana	28 June 2018
Harley Quinn and Wonder Woman are co-editors of the yearbook, but their opinions on what's yearbook worthy collide.

=== Season 5 (2018) ===
No. overall	No. in season	Title	Directed by	Written by	Original release date
90	1	"Spell-shocked, Part 1"	Scott O'Brien	Patrick Rieger	2 August 2018
After creating a portal to the future, Raven enlists the help of Wonder Woman and Batgirl to return her memory.
91	2	"Spell-shocked, Part 2"	Scott O'Brien	Patrick Rieger	9 August 2018
Raven and the DC Super Hero Girls must unite to protect the school from the magical Book of Legends.
92	3	"Kid Napped"	Scott O'Brien	Meghan Fitzmartin	16 August 2018
Batgirl is babysitting Robin when a sinister shadow creature appears.
93	4	"Bottle Episode"	Scott O'Brien	Patrick Rieger	23 August 2018
Supergirl must save the Bottled City of Kandor from her school trash processor.
94	5	"Career Day"	Scott O'Brien	Shane Sieders	30 August 2018
It's Career Day at Super Hero High and Wonder Woman is learning from the school janitor, Parasite.
95	6	"Mood Ring"	Scott O'Brien	Jessie Greenberg	6 September 2018
Emotions run wild when Star Sapphire breaks her ring. She must return everything back to normal before super feelings destroy the school.
96	7	"Stage Fright"	Scott O'Brien	Anne Mortensen-Agnew	13 September 2018
While the girls are preparing for the Super Hero High school play, Raven casts a good luck spell which doesn't quite go to plan.
97	8	"Hackgirl"	Scott O'Brien	Shaene Siders	20 September 2018
When Hawkgirl receives an unpredictable gadget upgrade from Batgirl, she struggles to fight off Cheshire.
98	9	"My New Best Friend"	Scott O'Brien	Joelle Sellner	27 September 2018
When Batgirl loses her memory, she is tricked by Catwoman into teaming up and committing crimes.
99	10	"Anti-Hall Monitor, Part 1"	Scott O'Brien	Jeremy Adams	4 October 2018
In an attempt to get around the ever watchful eye of Hawkgirl, Batgirl creates a sinister app to track her whereabouts.
100	11	"Anti-Hall Monitor, Part 2"	Scott O'Brien	Jeremy Adams	11 October 2018
The Anti-Hall Monitor app is out of control and Hawkgirl must come out of retirement to fix Batgirl's mistake.
101	12	"Haunted Harley"	Scott O'Brien	Joelle Sellner	18 October 2018
After being sent to detention, Harley Quinn becomes convinced that Super Hero High is haunted.
102	13	"All Pets Are Off"	Tod Carter & Zach Mekelburg	Joelle Sellner	25 October 2018
It is Pet Day at Super Hero High and DC Heroes such as Wonder Woman, Harley Quinn, The Flash, and Batgirl have brought along some of the bravest animals they know to compete in the competition. But when some of the Super-Pets start to mysteriously disappear, the heroes will have to enlist the help of the Teen Titans shape-shifting hero, Beast Boy - to locate their missing animal friends.
103	14	"The Wobble"	Tod Carter & Zach Mekelburg	Amy Wolfram	1 November 2018
Wonder Woman, Supergirl, and Bumblebee compete in Super Hero High's gymnastics competition. Wonder Woman is upset after she "wobbles" on her balance beam dismount landing. When Bleez crashes the competition, Wonder Woman uses The Wobble to her advantage to defeat her.
104	15	"Rolling Blunder"	Tod Carter & Zach Mekelburg	Amy Wolfram	8 November 2018
When Big Barda reluctantly joins the Roller Derby team, the bout against the Furies threatens to demolish Metropolis.
105	16	"Target Practice"	Tod Carter & Zach Mekelburg	Jessie Greenberg	15 November 2018
Starfire discovers a brand new Earth game which she'll use to defend her friends Wonder Woman and Supergirl from Kryptomites.
106	17	"Mindscape"	Tod Carter & Zach Mekelburg	Anne Mortensen-Agnew	22 November 2018
When a mysterious force traps Bumblebee inside a dream, Miss Martian must go inside her friend's mind and free her.
107	18	"For The Girl Who Has Everything"	Tod Carter & Zach Mekelburg	Meghan Fitzmartin and Jeremy Adams	29 November 2018
Supergirl attempts to fix the things that frustrate her in order to have a perfect world.
108	19	"Missing Martian"	Tod Carter & Zach Mekelburg	Denise Downer	6 December 2018
Miss Martian wants everyone to forget her birthday, but she gets a bad surprise when her friends seem more interested in attacking Metropolis.
109	20	"Water Water Nowhere"	Tod Carter & Zach Mekelburg	Denise Downer	13 December 2018
When Killer Croc breaks the school's water main before a burglary, Mera's the only one there to stop him - and she has no water to use to defend herself.
110	21	"Fortress of Solidarity"	Cecilia Aranovich Hamilton and Ian Hamilton	Shea Fontana	20 December 2018
It's the holidays at Super Hero High and Supergirl is reminded of how much she misses her parents. In an attempt to quench her homesickness, Supergirl goes to the North Pole where she is attacked by Captain Cold.
111	22	"Super Gift Swap"	Scott O'Brien	Patrick Rieger	22 December 2018
It's the Super Hero High gift exchange and the DC Super Hero Girls are cautious of Harley's ticking gift.
112	23	"My So-Called Anti-Life"	Tod Carter & Zach Mekelburg	Joelle Sellner, Patrick Rieger and Jeremy Adams	27 December 2018
Darkseid infiltrates Super Hero High's math club and manipulates the students into helping him access the Anti-Life Equation.
