= Rocker bottom shoe =

Shoe with a thick, curved sole

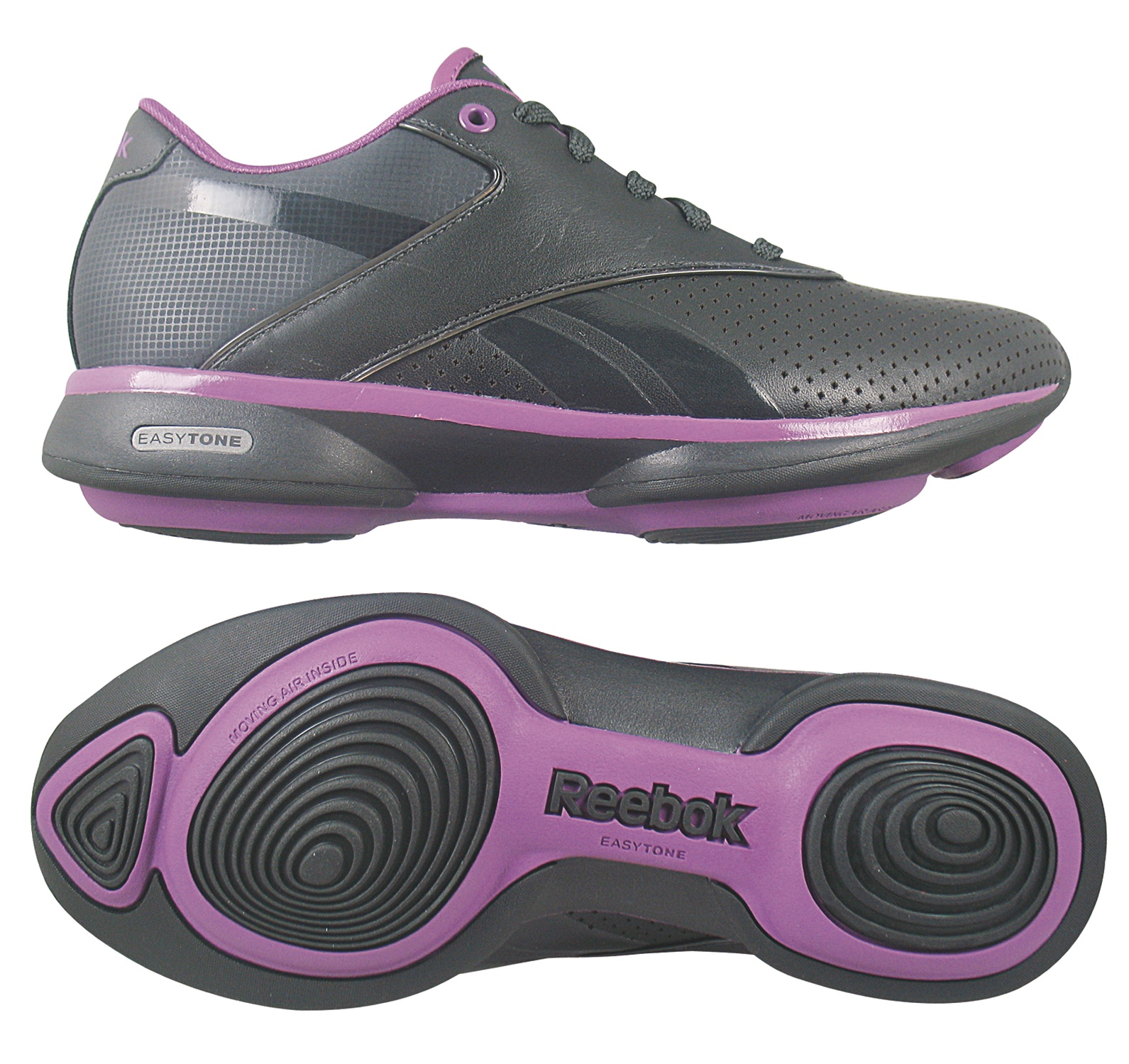
Reebok EasyTone toning shoes with a mild rocker sole

A rocker sole shoe or rocker bottom shoe is a shoe that has a thicker-than-normal sole with a rounded heel. Such shoes ensure the wearer does not have flat footing along the proximal-distal axis of the foot. The shoes are generically known by a variety of names, including round bottom shoes, round/ed sole shoes, and toning shoes, but also by various brand names. Tyrell & Carter identified at least six standard variations of the rocker sole shoe and named them: toe-only rocker, rocker bar, mild rocker, heel-to-toe rocker, negative heel rocker and double rocker.

The construction of most varieties of rocker sole shoes means that the wearer's body weight is shifted behind the ankle, and the wearer is required to do more work than would be required in flat-soled shoes to find their center of gravity and remain balanced. In the 2000s, a heel-to-toe rocker sole shoe for the sports footwear market was popularized by brands such as MBT, Shape-Ups by Skechers, and Reebok EasyTone.

== Therapeutic claims ==
Rocker soles may replace regular soles on any style of footwear. Some rocker bottom shoes are purpose-built to reduce the function or replace the lost function of a joint. For example, a person with a hallux rigidus (stiff big toe) may use a rocker bottom shoe to replace the flexion lost at the metatarsal joint. Rocker bottom shoes are also used to compensate for the lost range of motion, however caused, at the tibiotalar joint (ankle joint). In such cases, the wearer maintains solid and stable footing while standing, but the rock of the heel assists with the propulsive phase of gait, making walking more natural and less painful to the affected joints. Beneficiaries of this type of sole modification include people suffering from arthritis or any other disorder or injury causing pain and/or loss of motion in foot joints.

Proponents of modern heel-to-toe rocker sole shoes claim that because the foot of the wearer is slightly destabilised, certain lesser-worked muscle groups in the leg, such as the core and gluteus, are challenged more than they are normally. As such they are purported to derive health benefits for the wearer, such as improved posture and tighter muscles.

The NICE guidelines in the UK state that healthcare professionals should not offer rocker-bottom shoes as a treatment for people with lower back pain or sciatica. No studies found significant health benefits in the short- or long-term, and several found significant harms in terms of worsened anxiety and depression among people who had lower back pain. One study found that flat-bottomed shoes may be better for people whose lower back pain is aggravated by walking or standing.

Rocker-bottom shoes do not increase muscle use in the legs or burn more calories. A 2010 study found there was no fitness benefit to wearing rocker sole shoes. The study was cited in a 2011 class action lawsuits alleging false advertising by New Balance, Reebok, and other manufacturers. In 2012, Skechers agreed to settle a class action lawsuit for US$40 million based on a U.S. Federal Trade Commission complaint that it had misled customers with its Shape-Ups rocker bottom shoe advertisements.

A 2009 study raised concern that rocker sole shoes may increase the risk of falls. While research by Wang (2009) indicates that this may not be a problem in able-bodied individuals, it has been demonstrated to be a concern in older individuals who experience balance problems.

== History ==
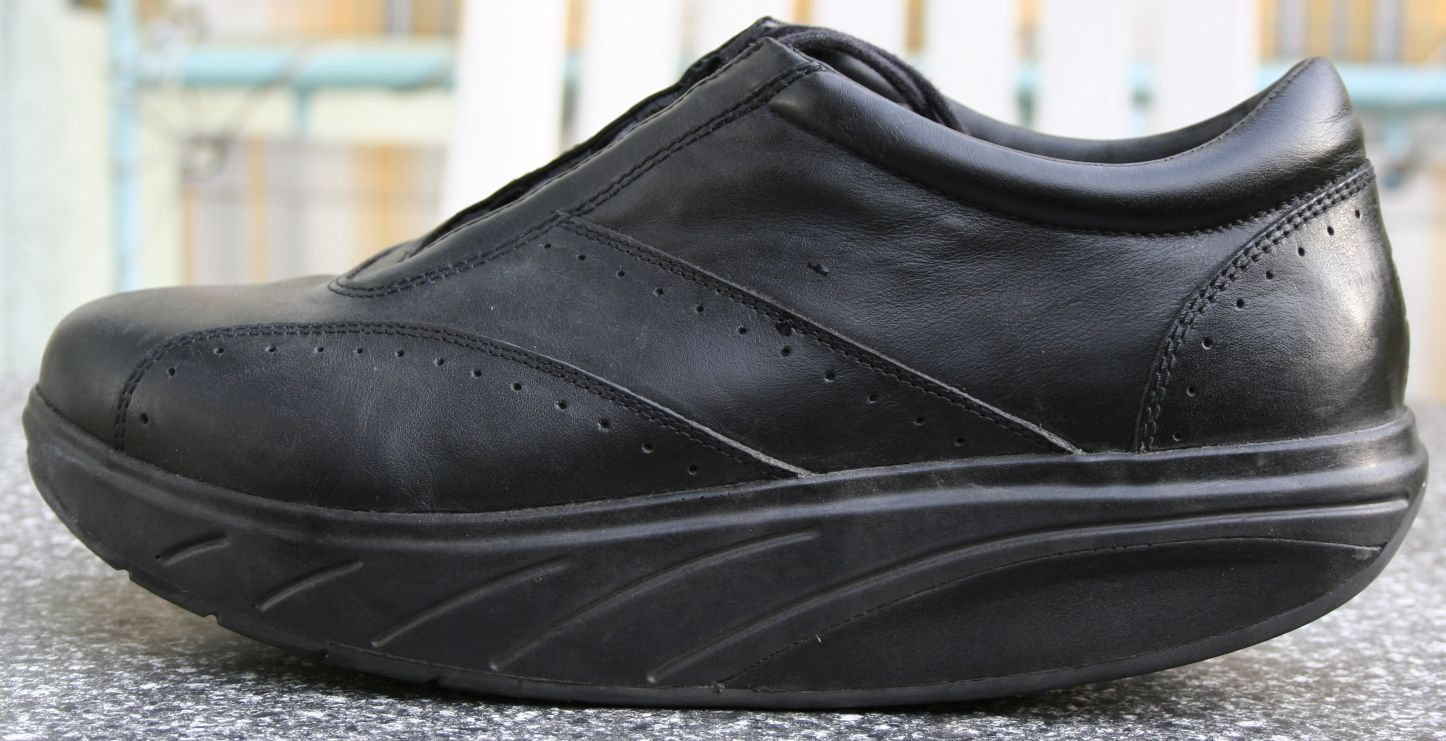
MBT rocker sole shoes

Rocker sole shoes have been referenced in publications as early as 1990. Branded generic rocker sole shoes were popularized for the mass market in the late 1990s and 2000s by the Swiss Masai company as Masai Barefoot Technology or MBT. According to Swiss Masai, the market concept originated with engineer and former athlete Karl Müller, who intended they would "simulate the challenge of walking barefoot on soft earth". Various other sports footwear companies followed suit with their own branded versions of the heel-to-toe rocker targeted at the exercise equipment market. A news report estimated that 200,000 pairs of modern heel-to-toe rocker sole shoes were sold in the US in 2005.

== See also ==
- List of shoe styles
- Barefoot running
