= Skechers =

American multinational footwear and apparel manufacturer

Skechers U.S.A., Inc.
- Logo used since 2004

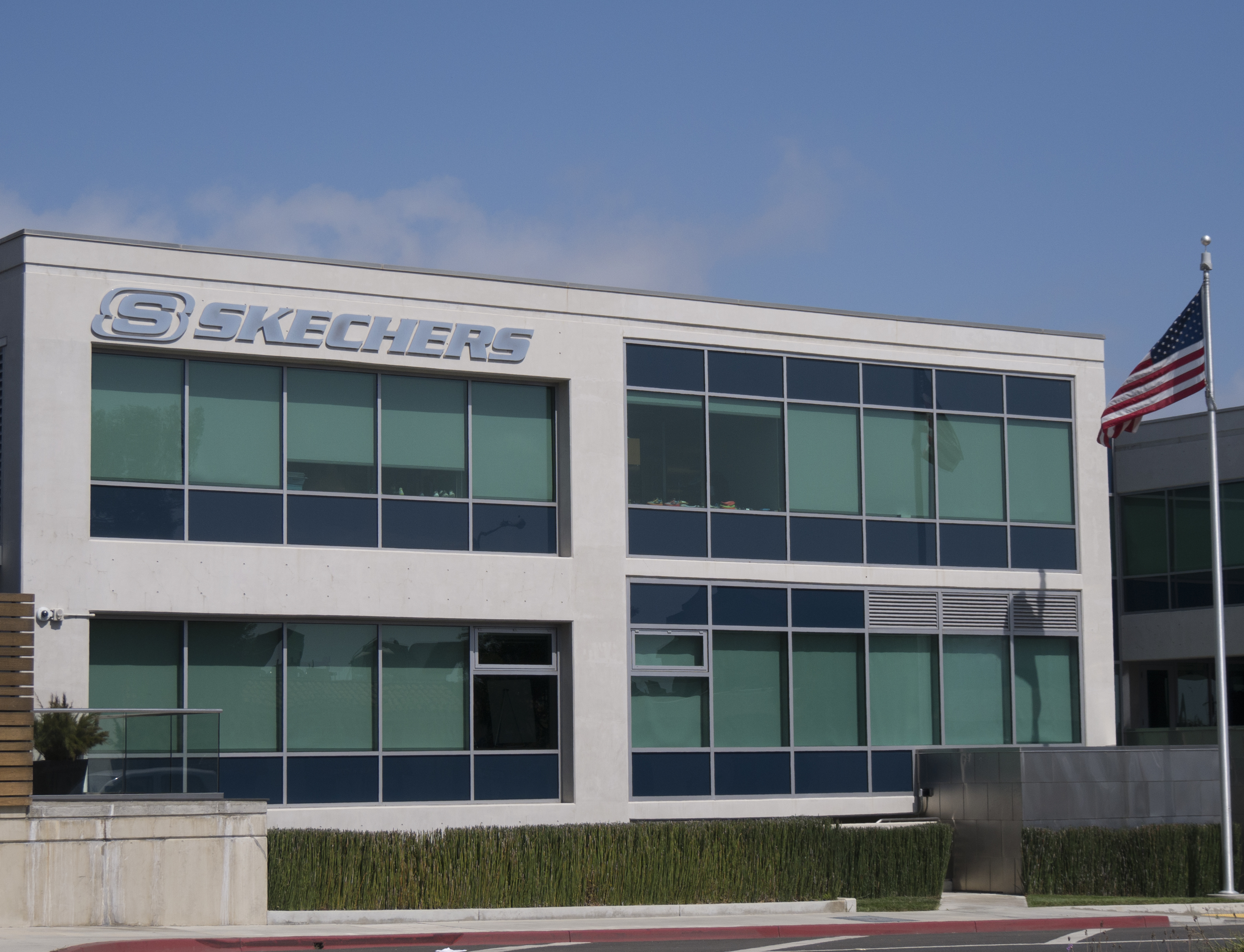
- Headquarters in Manhattan Beach, California
- Type: Private
- Industry: Clothing
- Founded: 1992; 34 years ago
- Founder: Robert Greenberg
- Headquarters: Manhattan Beach, California, U.S.
- Number of locations: 5,296 (2024)
- Area served: Worldwide
- Key people: Robert Greenberg (chairman and CEO); Michael Greenberg (president)
- Products: Shoes; Apparel
- Revenue: ▲US$8.97 billion (2024)
- Operating income: ▲US$904.3 million (2024)
- Net income: ▲US$639.5 million (2024)
- Total assets: ▲US$8.45 billion (2024)
- Number of employees: ≈ 20,100 (2024)
- Parent: 3G Capital
- Website: www.skechers.com

Skechers U.S.A., Inc. is an American multinational footwear and apparel manufacturing company. Founded in 1992, it is headquartered in Manhattan Beach, California, and is the third largest footwear brand in the world.

== History ==
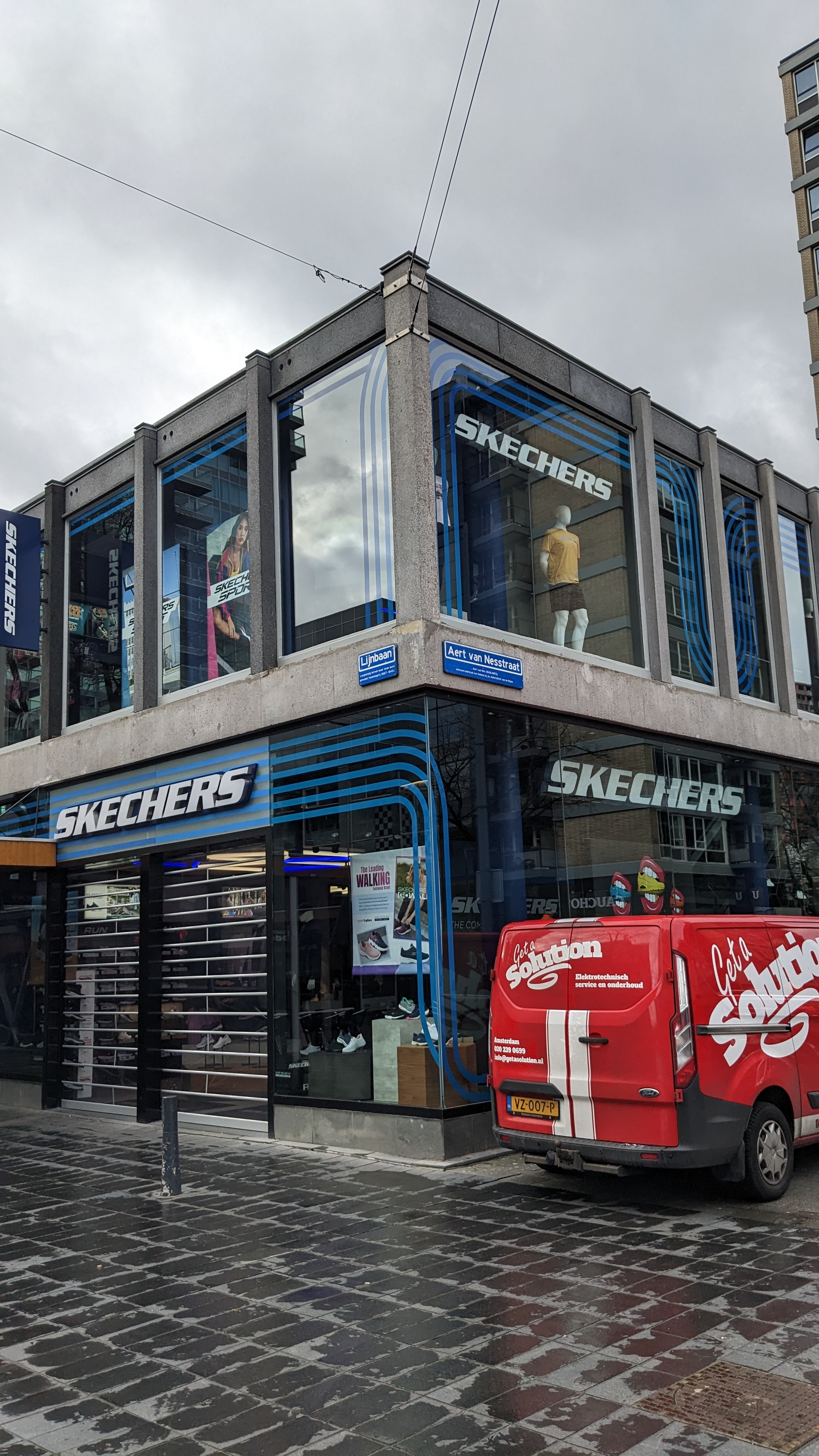
A store in Rotterdam, Netherlands

Skechers was founded in 1992 by Robert Greenberg, who had previously founded LA Gear in 1983 (he stepped down as CEO of that company the same year he founded Skechers).

Greenberg sought to focus on men's street shoes; Skechers' early products were utility-style boots popular in grunge fashion. The firm quickly expanded to include women and children, with casual and athletic styles, and went public in 1999.

In 2011, it launched its performance sportswear line for athletes and signed Meb Keflezighi as a spokesman.

Skechers is the third largest footwear brand in the world by sales. In January 2019, the company started an expansion of its corporate headquarters to double its office, design and showroom space in the South Bay. In 2023, Skechers had its debut on the Fortune 500.

=== Litigation ===
In 2012, Skechers agreed to settle a class action lawsuit for $40 million based on a U.S. Federal Trade Commission complaint that it had misled customers with its Shape-Ups rocker bottom shoe advertisements.

In 2015, Adidas filed a trademark infringement lawsuit against Skechers. Among the numerous infringements was the Skechers Onix, which was allegedly a copy of the Adidas Stan Smith. The parties reached a confidential settlement on May 30, 2018.

In 2019, Nike filed a patent infringement lawsuit against Skechers because, according to Nike, Skechers had infringed on the design of its VaporMax and Air Max 270 sneakers.

In 2024, Skechers filed a patent infringement lawsuit against Authentic Brands Group, claiming the Rockport Tristen Step Activated Slip On shoes infringe on Skechers' Slip Ins design patent.

In 2025, Utah-based footwear company Kizik filed a patent infringement lawsuit against Skechers. According to the lawsuit, Kizik holds over 200 patents for shoes with a stabilizer for hands-free wear, and Skechers infringed on 7 of those patents with its Slip Ins.

In May 2026, a U.S. judge ordered Skechers to face a proposed class action lawsuit accusing the company of spamming consumers with misleading sales emails.

Skechers has tried to argue in court that it doesn't make sneakers in order to avoid paying taxes in Massachusetts, but in July 2026 the Supreme Judicial Court upheld the appeals court ruling against the company.

=== Forced labor investigation ===
In 2021, French prosecutors launched an investigation into whether Skechers and other brands had concealed or profited from forced Uyghur labor. A December 2023 report by Sheffield Hallam University again found connections to forced Uyghur labor. Skechers has found no evidence of forced labor taking place. In September 2024, Skechers opened a store in Ürümqi, Xinjiang, amid criticism from the Worker Rights Consortium.

=== Privatization ===
On May 5, 2025, Skechers announced that it would be acquired by private equity firm 3G Capital. Following the closure of the transaction within the third quarter of that year, pending regulatory approval, Skechers would delist from the New York Stock Exchange and become a privately held company. The acquisition was finalized in September 2025.

== Products and advertising ==
Skechers designs, develops and markets a range of lifestyle and performance footwear, apparel and accessories for adults and children. Its brands include Skechers Sport, Slip-ins, D'Lites, the charity line Bobs, Mark Nason, Skechers Work, Go Walk, Go Run, and Go Golf.

Skechers has promoted its products with musicians including Ringo Starr, Britney Spears, Christina Aguilera, Willie Nelson, and Snoop Dogg; television personalities Martha Stewart, Brooke Burke, and Amanda Kloots; baseball player Clayton Kershaw and boxer Sugar Ray Leonard; and American football players (retired) Joe Montana, Tony Romo, Howie Long, and Cris Carter. Since 2010, Skechers has been a regular Super Bowl advertiser.

On March 1, 2019, Skechers launched a print and digital comparative advertising campaign titled "Just Blew It" to highlight the Zion Williamson failed shoe incident with rival Nike.

Skechers has been a partner of W Racing Team (WRT) in sports car racing, including former MotoGP champion Valentino Rossi, since 2021. WRT's parent company, Weerts Group, services Skechers' European distribution center in Liège, Belgium.

Skechers Performance has featured distance runner Meb Keflezighi and professional golfers Brooke Henderson and Matt Fitzpatrick. The brand expanded into pickleball in 2022, signing several of the sport's top players and sponsoring the first nationally televised pickleball tournament in the U.S. In 2023, Skechers announced a move into soccer and basketball, introducing new technical shoes worn and promoted by England national football team player Harry Kane and NBA players Julius Randle, Terance Mann, and Joel Embiid. In 2024, Skechers replaced Nivia Sports as the kit sponsor of one of India's oldest and most successful football teams, Mohun Bagan Super Giant. In the European market, Skechers distributes its lifestyle and performance lines through a network of company-owned stores and authorized third-party retailers. In Spain, the brand's products are available through specialized footwear e-commerce platforms and multi-brand retailers such as Megacalzado.

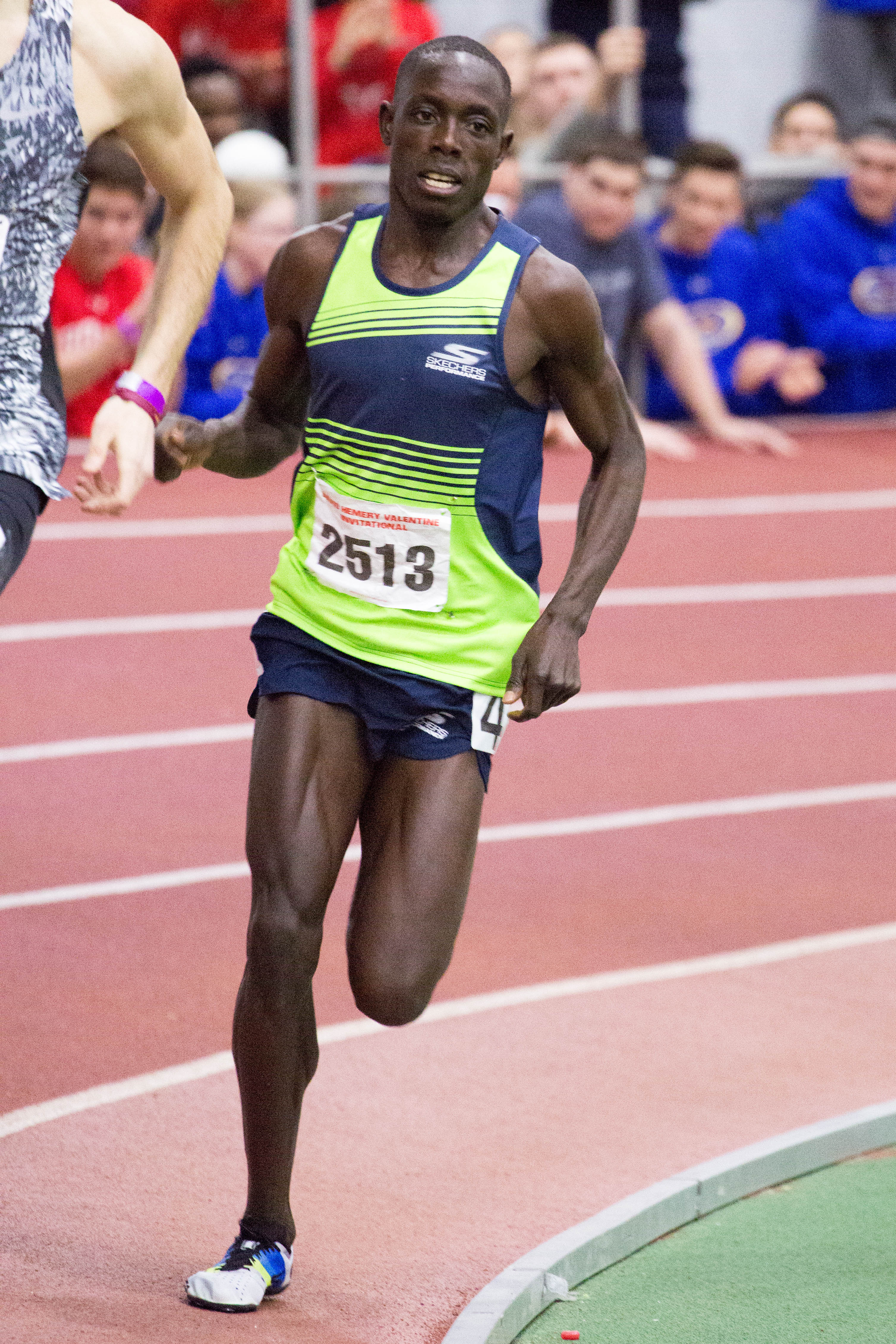
Edward Cheserek has endorsed Skechers Performance since 2017.

A Skechers retail store in the United States

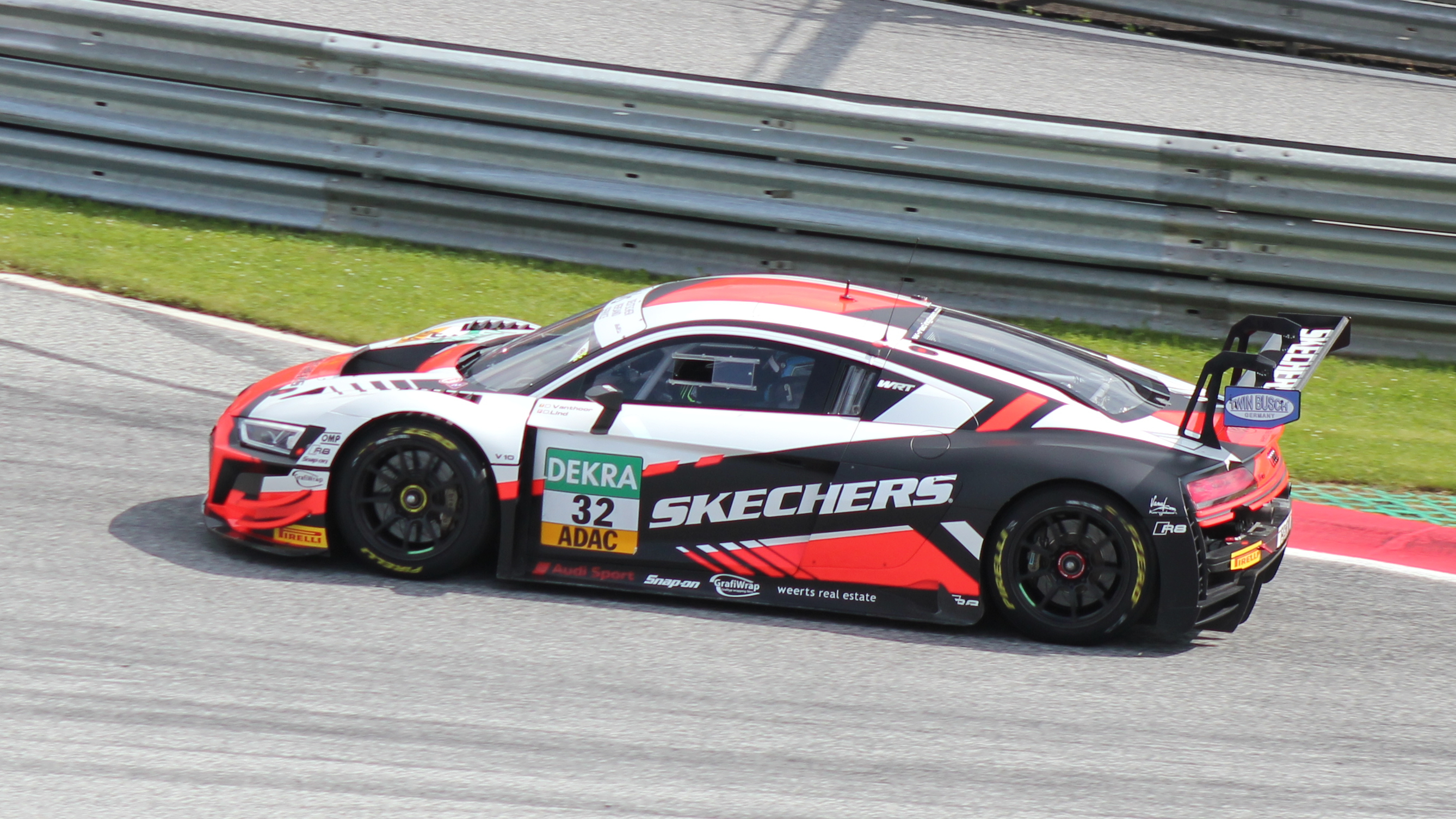
Car #32 at the 2021 ADAC GT Masters in Austria

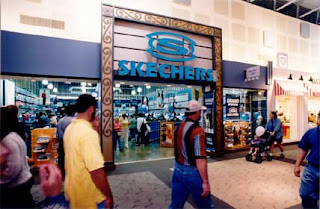
An early 2000s Skechers store located in Georgia, Sugarloaf Mills.

== Philanthropy ==
Skechers launched its Skechers Foundation in 2010. Skechers and the Friendship Foundation host an annual walk in Manhattan Beach to raise money for a nonprofit that helps connect special-needs students with their peers.

Skechers donates new shoes to children in need worldwide through its Bobs charity program. The shoes support Head Start programs, education foundations, homeless shelters, disaster relief and 501(c)(3) organizations. Bobs also supports animal welfare groups including Petco Love and Woodgreen Pets Charity. In 2024, Skechers donated $20,000 to Austin High School men and women's soccer teams.

== Entertainment ==
Skechers has developed—with MoonScoop Entertainment and animator/co-producer John Massé—an animated series, Zevo-3, and several direct-to-DVD features produced by SD Entertainment:

- Hydee and the Hytops: The Movie (2011)
- Twinkle Toes (2012)
- Twinkle Toes Lights Up New York (2016)
