= List of Tales of Arcadia characters =

Tales of Arcadia is a trilogy of American computer-animated science fantasy television series created for Netflix by Guillermo del Toro and produced by DreamWorks Animation and Double Dare You. It follows the inhabitants of the small suburban town of Arcadia Oaks, which is secretly home to various supernatural creatures, and the teenage heroes who fight against the forces of evil that lurk in the shadows.

The following is a list of characters who have appeared in the show.

== Main characters ==
=== Jim Lake Jr. ===
Voiced by Anton Yelchin (2016–2018) and Emile Hirsch (2018–2021).

The main protagonist of Trollhunters and the epilogue film, Rise of the Titans. Jim is the first human trollhunter, the son of Barbara Lake, best friends with Toby Domzaski, and the boyfriend of Claire Nunez. In the third season of Trollhunters, he was transformed into a half-troll and into a full-on troll in Wizards, by the Arcane Order and the Green Knight. However, he is revived back to his human form by Claire in Wizards and becomes Excalibur's new wielder in Trollhunters: Rise of the Titans.

=== Toby Domzalski ===
Voiced by Charlie Saxton.

A main character of Trollhunters. Tobias "Toby" Domzalski is Jim's best friend and confidant. Dorky and excitable, he fully embraces the secret world of trolls and aids Jim in his quests. His weapon of choice is a warhammer. In Trollhunters: Rise of the Titans, he sacrificed himself to save his best friend, and Jim makes the decision to turn back time to the first episode of Trollhunters, resulting in Toby taking on the titular role of Trollhunter. Son of Ralph Domzalski and Mrs. Domzalski (Both Dead), Grandson of Nancy Domzalski.

=== Claire Nuñez ===
Voiced by Lexi Medrano.

A main character of Trollhunters. Claire Nuñez is Jim's love interest and girlfriend whom she cares deeply for even after he was turned into a half human, troll hybrid. She is a sarcastic, kind, and intelligent tomboy who enjoys books and is a talented martial artist and gymnast. She obtains the Shadow Staff, Skrathe-Hrun, a staff capable of creating portals activated by the user's emotions.

=== Aja Tarron ===
Voiced by Tatiana Maslany.

A main character of 3Below. Aja Tarron is a member of House Tarron, a royal family in Akiridion-5. When her planet was invaded by a coup caused by Val Morando, she and her brother Krel travel to Earth. Since then, they pretended to be foreign exchange students from "Cantaloupia" while trying to fix their spaceship.

=== Krel Tarron ===
Voiced by Diego Luna.

A main character of 3Below. Krel Tarron is a member of House Tarron, a royal family in Akiridion-5. When his planet was invaded by a coup caused by Val Morando, he and his sister Aja travel to Earth. Since then, they pretended to be foreign exchange students from "Cantaloupia" while trying to fix their spaceship. At the end of 3Below, Krel remains on Earth while Aja returns to Akirdion-5. He assists Douxie in Wizards by creating a device to help Douxie trap Bellroc and Skrael and creates Jim's new amulet in Trollhunters: Rise of the Titans.

=== Varvatos Vex ===
Voiced by Nick Offerman.

A main character of 3Below. Varvatos Vex is a Commander who serves House Tarron. Prior to that, his planet was destroyed (and his family killed) by the Zenon Brotherhood, who were hired by General Morando during that time. Varvatos was misled by Morando to betray House Tarron under the false promise of avenging his family (and making sure nobody was hurt during his invasion). When the Tarrons were almost dead, Varvatos felt guilty for allowing this to happen. Therefore, he swore himself to protect Aja and Krel while he attempted to redeem himself. Over his time on Earth, he becomes passionate with life and falls in love with Toby's nana, Nancy.

=== Hisirdoux ‘Douxie’ Casperan ===
Voiced by Colin O'Donoghue.

A main character of 'Wizards', debuting as a recurring character during the third season of Troll-hunters, with a few minor appearances in 3Below, Hisirdoux Casperan is a charming English teen from Arcadia Oaks Academy whose band, "Ash Dispersal Pattern," is an entrant in the Battle of the Bands before the Eternal Night. However, he is really the apprentice and adoptive son of Merlin, and has existed since the 12th century.

=== Blinky Galadrigal ===
Voiced by Kelsey Grammer.

A main character of Trollhunters. Blinkous "Blinky" Galadrigal is Jim's six-eyed, four-armed troll mentor. A wise and scholarly troll with a heart of gold, he serves as the brains of the Trollhunters and eventually becomes a sort of father figure to Jim.

=== AAARRRGGHH!!! ===
Voiced by Fred Tatasciore.

A main character of Trollhunters. AAARRRGGHH!!! (real name Aarghaumont) is a burly troll and close companion of Blinky who forms a deep bond with Toby, known to him as “wingman”. He was kidnapped/traded by Queen Usurna to the Gumm-Gumms as a child, which stunted his vocabulary. Tormented by the atrocities they committed, he deserted Gunmar to live a life of peace. However, he will still fight to protect those he cares about.

=== Steve Palchuk ===
Voiced by Steven Yeun.

A main character of the trilogy, debuting in Trollhunters. Steve Palchuk is a narcissistic rebel who frequently harasses Jim. Suspicious of Jim's unusual behavior, he eventually discovers the truth of the existence of trolls and teams up with Eli Pepperjack to form the "CreepSlayerz" to help Jim. He develops feelings for Aja during the events of 3Below even after learning she is an alien, and becomes her boyfriend. He becomes a knight in Wizards and his weapon of choice is an axe nicknamed 'Toothache'.

=== Eli Pepperjack ===
Voiced by Cole Sand.

A main character of the trilogy, debuting in Trollhunters. Elijah "Eli" Leslie Pepperjack is a nerdy classmate of Jim who believes in the paranormal activity in Arcadia Oaks. He later teams up with Steve Palchuk to investigate the strange creatures they both have seen and to help Jim. He also aids the Taron siblings in the second season of 3Below, leaving with Aja to serve as a human ambassador on Akiridion-5. Pepperjack returns in Trollhunters: Rise of the Titans, his time on Akiridon-5 having did wonders for his maturity as he helps with the fight against the Arcane Order.

=== Luug ===
Voiced by Frank Welker.

A major character of 3Below, Luug is an alien dog who is the royal pet to Aja and Krel Tarron.

=== Archie ===
Voiced by Alfred Molina.

A character debuted in the final episode of 3Below, Archibald "Archie" is known as a familiar, a wizard's assistant who takes the form of an anthropomorphic black cat wearing glasses, with a white mark on his chest shaped like a Q or a black catlike dragon. He appeared before Steve, Toby and AAARRRGGHH!!! to warn them that a new threat is approaching Arcadia and the world is coming to an end. He is the son of Charlemagne the Devouerer. In Trollhunters: Rise of the Titans, he stayed with his father in Hong Kong to rule a kingdom.

=== Merlin Ambrossius ===
Voiced by David Bradley.

A main character of Trollhunters, debuting in the third season and a major character in Wizards, Merlin is the wizard who created the Trollhunter's Amulet of Daylight. He dies in Wizards, by the hands of the Green Knight.

== Supporting characters ==
=== Barbara Lake ===
Voiced by Amy Landecker.

A recurring character of Trollhunters, Barbara Lake is Jim's protective and overworked mother. Her husband (James Lake Sr.) left the family when Jim was five years old. Her doctor job means she's often away from home, which lets Jim pursue his Trollhunter duties.

=== Nancy Domzalski ===
Voiced by Laraine Newman

A recurring character of Trollhunters, Nancy Domzalski is the grandmother and legal guardian of Toby Domzalski, and Mother of Ralph Domzalski and Mother In Law of Mrs. Domzalski (both deceased) In 3Below, Nancy later becomes the love interest of Varvatos Vex.

=== Walter Strickler ===
Voiced by Jonathan Hyde.

A recurring character of Trollhunters. Walt Strickler (real name Waltolomew Stricklander) is Jim's history teacher, who is actually a Changeling. When Jim discovers the truth, he loses all respect for him and the two become bitter enemies. However, he remains affable toward Jim and has redeeming qualities. He even admits his kindness for Jim, and his love for Jim's single mother Barbara, to the point of deserting the Gumm-Gumms and the Janus Order. Over time, he regained the trust from everyone else, especially Jim, Barbara and Blinky. He later sacrifices himself in an attempt to stop the ice titan during the events of Trollhunters: Rise of the Titans.

=== Kanjigar the Courageous ===
Voiced by Tom Hiddleston (Trollhunters, ep. 1) and James Purefoy (present).

A recurring character of Trollhunters and a 2-time appearance in 3Below, Kanjigar the Courageous is Draal's father and the noble Trollhunter prior to Jim. His ghost tutors Jim, often worrying about Jim's team fighting style, believing that the Trollhunter must work alone to avoid endangering those he cares about – this leads to Jim's guilt and decision to venture into the Darklands alone.

=== Draal the Deadly ===
Voiced by Matthew Waterson.

A recurring character of Trollhunters. Draal is the son of the previous Trollhunter, Kanjigar. He is originally jealous and suspicious of Jim but later befriends him – acting as Jim's fighting tutor. During a battle in the museum, Draal sacrifices his lower right arm while removing the Trollhunter amulet from the Killahead Bridge to close the portal, and later obtains a mechanical prosthetic. Draal explains that his father kept a distance from him as he grew up, and he had hoped to become the next Trollhunter that he might earn his father's approval. During the Battle for the Staff of Avalon, he is killed by Angor Rot, tying to protect Jim from the latter who was about to hit him with a fatal blow.

=== Gnome Chompsky ===
Voiced by Rodrigo Blaas.

A recurring character of Trollhunters, Chompsky is a gnome adopted by Toby. He started out as a "rogue gnome" causing trouble, but after he was finally defeated by Jim, he became friendly when he was given a dollhouse to live in and a plastic doll to be his companion. He later helped locate Enrique in the Darklands and also helped rescue Jim from the Darklands.

=== Coach Lawrence ===
Voiced by Thomas F. Wilson.

A recurring character of Trollhunters. Coach Lawrence is the tough gym and health teacher of Arcadia Oaks High school. He later becomes Steve Palchuck’s stepdad after he started dating his mother and apparently married her off camera. Also has a minor a recurring role in “3Below” and a guest appearance in “Wizards” and is one of the more comical relief characters in the Tales of Arcadia Saga.

=== Nari of the Eternal Forest ===
Voiced by Angel Lin.

A major character of Wizards, Nari is a defected member of the Arcane Order and the sibling of Bellroc and Skrael who left after being horrified by the war between Arthur and the Gum Gums that they engineered. Nari has been hiding under the care of Merlin and then Douxie to keep herself from being captured and forced to enact the ritual to unseal the titans. In Rise of The Titans, Nari is captured by the Arcane Order and played under a pell to unseal the titans while piloting her own to Arcadia before Douxie restores her mind. While Nari sacrificed herself to kill Skrael, she provided Jim the means to travel back when he became the current Trollhunter and change the future for the better.

=== Zelda Nomura ===
Voiced by Lauren Tom.

A recurring character of Trollhunters, Nomura is a Changeling colleague of Strickler's whose cover is a museum curator while in safekeeping the pieces of the Killahead Bridge found by the Janus Order. Originally an antagonist, she was pulled into the Darklands and imprisoned by Gunmar for her failure and the death of his son Bular. When Jim is captured in the Darklands, the two form a connection and escape together. Nomura aids the Jim's group prior to being killed during the titan incident in Rise of the Titans.

=== NotEnrique ===
Voiced by Jimmie Wood.

A recurring character of Trollhunters, NotEnrique is the Changeling swapped with Claire's baby brother, Enrique. While troublesome and self-serving, he isn't actively malicious and even helps the Trollhunters from time to time (usually after being bribed). He forms a rocky but brotherly connection with Claire.

=== Darci Scott ===
Voiced by Yara Shahidi.

A recurring character of Trollhunters, Darci Scott is a friend of Claire Nuñez and Mary Wang and is the girlfriend of Toby Domzalski.

=== Mothership "Mother" ===
Voiced by Glenn Close.

A recurring character of 3Below, the Mothership is the artificially intelligent spaceship of House Tarron. She sacrifices herself to save the king and queen’s life cores.

=== Karl Uhl ===
Voiced by Fred Tatasciore.

A recurring character of Trollhunters. Señor Karl Uhl is a Spanish teacher of Austrian descent who serves as interim principal of Arcadia Oak High, taking an interest in the Taron siblings due to their status as foreign students.

=== Vendel ===
Voiced by Victor Raider-Wexler.

A recurring character of Trollhunters, Vendel is the elder of Heartstone Trollmarket. An ancient and wizened troll, Vendel is at first suspicious of Jim and often comes across as a pessimist, but shows a softer side and eventual faith in Jim. At the end of Part 2, he is killed by Usurna after she revealed herself to be working for Gunmar, but not before recording the act to warn the Trollhunters.

=== Mary Wang ===
Voiced by Lauren Tom.

A recurring character of Trollhunters. Mary Wang is a friend of Claire Nuñez and Darci Scott.

=== Zadra ===
Voiced by Hayley Atwell.

A recurring character of 3Below, Zadra is a lieutenant (then Commander) on Akiridion-5 of the Taylon Phalanx and later the leader of the Resistance against Morando's regime. After arriving on Earth at the end of Season 1, she helps Varvatos Vex protect the royals and reveals his betrayal.

== Antagonists ==
=== Gunmar ===
Voiced by Clancy Brown.

The main antagonist of Trollhunters, Gunmar is the iron-fisted leader of the Gumm-Gumms who plagued England before being banished to the Darklands by the first TrollHunter. He is powerful and ruthless, and will readily dispose of loyal minions and allies who can no longer serve him. He has no qualms about enslaving or killing his fellow trolls to accomplish his goals. He is killed by Jim after he became a half-Troll to fight him.

=== Bular ===
Voiced by Ron Perlman (Trollhunters) & Darin De Paul (Wizards).

The main antagonist of the first half of the first season of Trollhunters, Bular is the son of Gunmar. A brutish and powerful troll warrior, he is obsessed with freeing his father from the Darklands. He holds a special disdain for Changelings, whom he considers "impure", putting him at odds with Strickler and other Changelings who seek to free Gunmar. He is killed by Jim in the first part of Trollhunters.

=== Angor Rot ===
Voiced by Ike Amadi.

A recurring antagonist of Trollhunters being the main antagonist of the second half of first season and secondary antagonist of the third and final season. Angor Rot is an ancient troll warlock-assassin who hunts down Trollhunters and takes their souls. In medieval times, after Gunmar's war destroyed his village, Angor sought out power to protect his people. He traveled to Bulgaria's Black Sea and made a deal with Morgana, surrendering his own soul in return for his mystical powers. In part three, Morgana revived Angor Rot, returning his soul to accompany Gunmar to obtain the Staff of Avalon. In the series finale, Jim managed to convince him to see the error of his ways by reminding him of his past and who he was. He later aids Jim in his fight with Morgana on the bridge, holding her down while Jim impales both him and Morgana, sacrificing himself in the process.

=== Otto Scaarbach ===
Voiced by Tom Kenny.

A recurring antagonist of Trollhunters, Otto Scaarbach was a Changeling Polymorph from Germany who could change into the form of anyone. He was the Grand Commandant of the Janus Order, a secret society of Changelings who assist the Gumm-Gumms.

=== Usurna ===
Voiced by Anjelica Huston.

A recurring antagonist of Trollhunters. Usurna is the queen of the Krubera, AAARRRGGHH!!!'s race who lives in the Deep Caverns, and a member of a council of troll leaders known as the Troll Tribunal. She initially seems to be a kind queen concerned for AAARRRGGHH!!!'s well-being. As a Tribunal member, she is strict and judgmental and leads the Tribunal to act against Jim and his friends. She later reveals herself to be a traitor who works for Gunmar as she murdered Vendel before helping Gunmar take over Trollmarket at the end of Part 2. She is eventually pushed into a bog by her own people upon admitting that she handed AAARRRGGHH!!! and other Kubera to the Gum Gums.

=== Dictatious Galadrigal ===
Voiced by Mark Hamill.

A recurring antagonist of Trollhunters, debuting in the second season, Dictatious Galadrigal is Blinky's older brother. Presumed dead when dragged off by goblins during the Battle of Killahead Bridge, he ended up in the Darklands and serves as Gunmar's advisor while aiding in his quest to conquer the surface lands. He is blinded by Blinky during a struggle in the Darklands, attempting to reclaim his standing with Gunmar by claiming to a medium for Morgana. But once Gunmar saw though the deception, Dictatious is forced to seek refuge with Jim's group.

=== Morgana le Fay ===
Voiced by Lena Headey.

The overarching antagonist of Trollhunters who goes by numerous aliases that include Baba Yaga, Wizards: Tales of Arcadia revealing she was an apprentice of Merlin who blamed herself for the war between humans and trolls when Guinevere died and Arthur's xenophobia towards the supernatural worsened. It came to a head when Morgana fell to her death while in shock over Arthur cutting her hand in a moment of rage, resurrected by the Arcane Order to aid the Gum Gums as their liaison. But Morgana succumbs her to hatred when Belloc killed Arthur in front of her when they were about to reconcile, resulting in her being sealed away by Merlin at the cost of his magic. During the events of Trollhunters, Morgana gives her champion Angor Rot use of her staff before it ends up with Claire Nuñez, who uses it to banish her to the realm of the shadows. A despondent Morgana returns in Wizards when the Arcane Order bring her back at the behest of Arthur, whom she eventually realized is beyond redemption as she sacrificed herself to kill the Green Knight and peacefully departs with Merlin into the afterlife.

=== Val Morando ===
Voiced by Alon Aboutboul.

The main antagonist of 3Below, Val Morando is a disgraced General who initiates a coup against House Tarron and enlists bounter hunters to kill Aja and Krel to cement his rule. Upon learning of Gaylen's Core being on Earth, Morando personally arrives on Earth to obtain it and become a god-like being. But he ends being destroyed by Aja and Krel.

=== Zeron Brotherhood ===
A trio of hired mercenaries who serve as the main antagonist of the first season of 3Below, consisting of the jackal-like Zeron Alpha, Zeron Beta, and Zeron Omega. The three were also responsible for the attack that killed Vex's family, Alpha later revealing they were hired by Morando as part of his scheme to enlist Vex's compliance in his coup. Each member of the Zeron Brother is killed off, with Alpha the last member as he dies fighting Vex.

=== Tronos Madu ===
Voiced by Danny Trejo.

An aggressive reptilian bounty hunter with electric-based abilities. He took the job to avenge his planet for House Tarron's refusal to help, though he eventually forgave Aja for her parents' inaction while being held captive by Kubritz. He was killed by Morando due to his failure.

=== Colonel Kubritz ===
Voiced by Uzo Aduba.

A recurring antagonist of 3Below, Kubritz is a corrupt military officer who specializes in capturing any extraterrestrial life. Aja informs her of the error of her ways, and Kubritz sacrifices herself to weaken General Morando.

=== Bellroc, Keeper of the Flame ===
Voiced by Kay Bess and Piotr Michael (Male voice).

The main antagonist of Wizards and Rise of the Titans along with being the overreaching antagonist of the franchise, Bellroc is the violent and ruthless leader of the Arcane Order who were said to have created the world with their Titans. Despite their group's neutrality, Belloc breaks it upon seeing the damage that humans are doing to the world by first arranging Morgana to aid the Gumm-Gumms in their war with King Arthur. Belloc kills Arthur during the battle but is blinded by Deya the Deliverer prior to the Gumm-Gumms' imprisonment. Belloc later decides to capture their group's deserter Nari to awaken the Titans, theirs raising from the South China Sea and making its way to Arcadia. But Belloc meets their end when Jim stabs them with Excalibur while Toby negated their magic.

=== Skrael of the North Wind ===
Voiced by Piotr Michael.

Skrael is a sadistic member of the Arcane Order and Belloc's accomplice in their plan to remake the world with the Titans' power.

=== King Arthur Pendragon/Green Knight ===
Voiced by James Faulkner.

King Arthur is a recurring character of Wizards, a xenophobic man who despised the supernatural and found justification in declaring war on it when Guinevere died. This also caused the rift between him and Morgana for later being a sorceress and having feelings for Guinevere as well, resulting in a violent confrontation that ended with Arthur unintentionally killing his sister. After Morgana was brought back, Arthur attempts to make peace with his sister after realizing his mistake before Belloc killed him. But Belloc and Skrael resurrect him as their enforcer, the Green Knight, infecting Jim with a spell to control him so they can bring back Morgana. Despite Morgana's assumptions, Arthur reveals to be a willing aide to Belloc as he deems his actions justify the Arcane Order's resolve. He is later crushed under the remains of Camelot when Morgana sacrificed herself to stop her brother, with Excalibur passed on to Jim as a result.

== Others ==
=== Charlemagne ‘the Devourer’ ===
Voiced by Brian Blessed.

A minor character of Wizards, Charlemagne "Charlie" is an ancient dragon, friends with Merlin and the father of Archie. Contrary to his nickname "the Devourer", Charlemagne is generally friendly and hospitable. After Merlin's death, he comforts Douxie and helps him let go of Merlin.

=== Gladys Groe ===
A minor character of Trollhunters, Groe is a changeling spy. He is blown to dust by Dvorak stone.

=== Lenora Janeth ===
Voiced by Laraine Newman.

A recurring character of Trollhunters, Lenora Janeth is the algebra and drama teacher of Arcadia Oaks High.

=== James Lake Sr ===
James Lake Sr is a side character of TrollHunters and is the ex-husband of Barbara Lake. He is also the father of James Lake Jr. He gave Jim a bike kit on his 5th birthday and disappeared to Vermont, where he is courting another woman, as said by Toby Domzalski.

=== Mario Muelas ===
Voiced by Guillermo Del Toro.

Dr. Mario Muelas is a recurring character in the Tales of Arcadia franchise. He is Arcadia’s local dentist, the former employer of Gladys Groe, and Toby Domzalski's orthodontist.

=== Javier and Ophilia Nuñez ===
Voiced by Tom Kenny (Javier), Andrea Navedo (Ophilia).

Claire Nuñez's parents, Ophilia being a councilwoman of Arcadia Oaks. They initially dislike Jim.

=== Fialkov and Coranda Tarron ===
Voiced by Andy García (Fialkov), Charli Robinson(Coranda).

The rulers of Akiridion-5 and Aja's parents, their bodies were destroyed during Morando's invasion with their children taking their Life Cores to Earth so they can reconstitute. It would later be revealed the two came to Earth during the '50s to leave Gaylen's Core with the trolls.

=== Loth Saborian ===
Voiced by Chris Obi.

A recurring character in 3Below. Loth Saborian is a hammerhead shark-like alien who was the royal advisor for House Tarron on Akiridion-5.

=== Unkar the Unfortunate ===
Voiced by Wallace Shawn.

A minor character of Trollhunters. Unkar was a previous Trollhunter trained by Blinky before he trained Jim. However, Unkar's role as the Trollhunter was short lived when he was killed on his first night out, torn limb-from-limb. Prior to his death, he was hoping to be named "Unkar the Ultimate".

=== Zoe ===
Voiced by Sandra Saad.

Zoe is a minor character of 3Below and Wizards. She works for Zimroc Records Store and is later revealed to be a witch who works for Hex Tech.

=== Zong-Shi ===
Voiced by James Hong.

Zong-Shi was the regent of the TrollDragons.
