= List of black animated characters: 2000s =

This list of black animated characters lists fictional characters found on animated television series and in motion pictures, from 2000 to 2009. The Black people in this list include African American animated characters and other characters of Sub-Saharan African descent or populations characterized by dark skin color (a definition that also includes certain populations in Oceania, the southern West Asia, and the Siddi of southern South Asia).

The names are organized alphabetically by surname (i.e. last name), or by single name if the character does not have a surname.

== List ==
Character	Title	Duration	Voice actor	Creator	Ref.
Abasi	Wolverine and the X-Men	2009	Kevin Michael Richardson	Craig Kyle	
Abasi	Wolverine and the X-Men	2009	Kevin Michael Richardson	Greg Johnson	
Afro Samurai	Afro Samurai	2007	Crystal Scales	Takashi Okazaki	
Afro Samurai	Afro Samurai	2007	Phil LaMarr	Takashi Okazaki	
Afro Samurai	Afro Samurai	2007	Samuel L. Jackson	Takashi Okazaki	
Agni	Black Butler	2008-2010 (Note: Also in 2014)	Hiroki Yasumoto	Yana Toboso	
Agni	Black Butler	2008-2010	Patrick Seitz	Yana Toboso	
Love Aikawa	Bleach	2004-2012	Tetsu Inada	Noriyuki Abe	
Love Aikawa	Bleach	2004-2012	Travis Willingham	Noriyuki Abe	
Aisha (Note: Aisha's name is changed to Layla in most dubs until the Nickelodeon specials and season 5 revived the original name that remains for the rest of the Winx Club franchise.)	Winx Club	2004-2009	Lucinda Davis	Annita Romanelli	
Aisha	Winx Club	2004-2009	Alysha Deslorieux	Annita Romanelli	
Aisha	Winx Club	2004-2009	Vasthy Mompoint	Annita Romanelli	
Aisha	Winx Club	2004-2009	Keke Palmer	Annita Romanelli	
Aisha	Winx Club	2004-2009	Elinor Vanderburg	Iginio Straffi	
Aisha	Winx Club: The Secret of the Lost Kingdom	2007	Keke Palmer	Iginio Straffi	
Aisha	Winx Club: The Secret of the Lost Kingdom	2007	Mela Lee	Iginio Straffi	
Aisha	Winx Club: The Secret of the Lost Kingdom	2007	Laura Lenghi	Iginio Straffi	
A.J.	The Fairly OddParents	2001–2017	Gary LeRoi Gray	Butch Hartman	
Anansi	Static Shock	2000-2004	Carl Lumbly	Dwayne McDuffie	
Anansi	Static Shock	2000-2004	Carl Lumbly	Denys Cowan	
Anansi	Static Shock	2000-2004	Carl Lumbly	Michael Davis	
Anansi	Static Shock	2000-2004	Carl Lumbly	Derek Dingle	
Dr. Anokye	Static Shock	2000-2004	Roscoe Lee Browne	Dwayne McDuffie	
Dr. Anokye	Static Shock	2000-2004	Roscoe Lee Browne	Denys Cowan	
Dr. Anokye	Static Shock	2000-2004	Roscoe Lee Browne	Michael Davis	
Dr. Anokye	Static Shock	2000-2004	Roscoe Lee Browne	Derek Dingle	
April	Darker Than Black	2007	Takako Honda	Tensai Okamura	
April	Darker Than Black	2009	Nazia Chaudhry	Tensai Okamura	
Miyuki Ayukawa	Basquash!	2009	Masumi Asano	Shōji Kawamori	
Miyuki Ayukawa	Basquash!	2009	Masumi Asano	Thomas Romain	
Chief Barnsdale	Static Shock	2000-2004	Dennis Haysbert	Dwayne McDuffie	
Chief Barnsdale	Static Shock	2000-2004	Dennis Haysbert	Denys Cowan	
Chief Barnsdale	Static Shock	2000-2004	Dennis Haysbert	Michael Davis	
Chief Barnsdale	Static Shock	2000-2004	Dennis Haysbert	Derek Dingle	
Sid Barrett	Soul Eater	2008–2009	Masafumi Kimura	Atsushi Ōkubo	
Satoshi Batista	Michiko and Hatchin	2008-2009	Masaki Miura	Manglobe	
Satoshi Batista	Michiko and Hatchin	2008-2009	Akron Watson	Manglobe	
Bem	Humanoid Monster Bem	2006	Kazuhiko Inoue	Hiroshi Harada	
Detective Ethan Bennett / Clayface	The Batman	2004-2008	Michael Goguen	Steve Harris	
Detective Ethan Bennett / Clayface	The Batman	2004-2008	Duane Capizzi	Steve Harris	
Lucas Bishop	Wolverine and the X-Men	2009	Kevin Michael Richardson	Craig Kyle	
Lucas Bishop	Wolverine and the X-Men	2009	Kevin Michael Richardson	Greg Johnson	
Black Panther (T'Challa)	Ultimate Avengers 2	2006	Jeffrey D. Sams	Dong Woo Animation	
Black Vulcan	Harvey Birdman: Attorney at Law	2001-2007	Phil LaMarr	Michael Ouweleen	
Black Vulcan	Harvey Birdman: Attorney at Law	2001-2007	Phil LaMarr	Erik Richter	
Briar	Fairy Tail	2009–2019	Megumi Sato	Hiro Mashima	
Buford	The Princess and the Frog	2009	Michael Colyar	Peter Del Vecho	
Bumblebee	Teen Titans	2003-2006	T'Keyah Crystal Keymáh	Glen Murakami	
Bumblebee	Teen Titans	2003-2006	T'Keyah Crystal Keymáh	Sam Register	
Susanna "Susie" Carmichael	All Grown Up!	2003-2008	Cree Summer	Arlene Klasky	
Susanna "Susie" Carmichael	All Grown Up!	2003-2008	Cree Summer	Gábor Csupó	
Susanna "Susie" Carmichael	All Grown Up!	2003-2008	Cree Summer	Paul Germain	
Susanna "Susie" Carmichael	Rugrats Pre-School Daze	2008	Cree Summer	Paul Germain	
Trixie Carter	American Dragon: Jake Long	2005–2007	Kali Troy	Jeff Goode	
Chief	Buzz Lightyear of Star Command	2000-2004	Nichelle Nichols	Mark McCorkle	
Chief	Buzz Lightyear of Star Command	2000-2004	Nichelle Nichols	Bob Schooley	
Cobra Bubbles	Lilo & Stitch	2002	Ving Rhames	Clark Spencer	
Cobra Bubbles	Stitch! The Movie	2003	Ving Rhames	Tony Craig	
Cobra Bubbles	Stitch! The Movie	2003	Ving Rhames	Jess Winfield	
Cobra Bubbles	Stitch! The Movie	2003	Ving Rhames	Bobs Gannaway	
Cobra Bubbles	Lilo & Stitch: The Series	2003-2006	Ving Rhames	Chris Sanders	
Cobra Bubbles	Lilo & Stitch: The Series	2003-2006	Kevin Michael Richardson	Dean DeBlois	
Dr. Carver	The Proud Family Movie	2005	Arsenio Hall	Bruce W. Smith	
Michael Collins	The Proud Family	2001–2005	Phil LaMarr	Bruce W. Smith	
Taranee Cook	W.I.T.C.H.	2004-2006	Kali Troy	Andrew Nicholls	
Taranee Cook	W.I.T.C.H.	2004-2006	Kali Troy	Darrell Vickers	
Taranee Cook	W.I.T.C.H.	2004-2006	Kali Troy	Greg Weisman	
Cosmic Cleopatra	El Tigre: The Adventures of Manny Rivera	2007-2008	Erica Luttrell	Jorge R. Gutierrez	
Cosmic Cleopatra	El Tigre: The Adventures of Manny Rivera	2007-2008	Erica Luttrell	Sandra Equihua	
Cyborg (Stone)	Teen Titans	2003-2006	Khary Payton	Glen Murakami	
Cyborg (Stone)	Teen Titans	2003-2006	Khary Payton	Sam Register	
Cyborg 008 (Pyunma)	Cyborg 009: The Cyborg Soldier	2001–2002	Mitsuo Iwata	Shotaro Ishinomori	
Da Samurai	Samurai Jack	2001-2004 (Note: He also reappeared in the final season, in 2017, voiced by Keegan-Michael Key)	David Alan Grier	Genndy Tartakovsky	
Darui	Naruto: Shippuden	2007–2017	Ryota Takeuchi	Masashi Kishimoto	
Deed	Zoids: Fuzors	2003	Cusse Mankuma	Tomy	
Carver Descartes	The Weekenders	2000	Phil LaMarr	Doug Langdale	
Todd Descartes	The Weekenders	2000	Cree Summer	Doug Langdale	
Doc (Carl W. Greer)	G.I. Joe: Resolute	2009	Steve Blum	Hasbro	
Dorthy	Burst Angel	2004	Charlet DuPar	Koichi Ohata	
Dorthy	Burst Angel	2004	Kei Kobayashi	Koichi Ohata	
Jazmine DuBois	The Boondocks	2005-2014	Gabby Soleil	Aaron McGruder	
Jazmine DuBois	The Boondocks	2005-2014	Kiarah Pollas	Aaron McGruder	
Dutch	Black Lagoon	2006	Tsutomu Isobe	Rei Hiroe	
Dutch	Black Lagoon	2006	Dean Redman	Rei Hiroe	
Ebon / Ivan Evans	Static Shock	2000-2004	Gary Sturgis	Dwayne McDuffie	
Ebon / Ivan Evans	Static Shock	2000-2004	Gary Sturgis	Denys Cowan	
Ebon / Ivan Evans	Static Shock	2000-2004	Gary Sturgis	Michael Davis	
Ebon / Ivan Evans	Static Shock	2000-2004	Gary Sturgis	Derek Dingle	
Enok	Rahan: Son of the Dark Age	2008	Phil LaMarr	Roger Lécureux	
Eudora	The Princess and the Frog	2009	Oprah Winfrey	Peter Del Vecho	
Dr. Facilier	The Princess and the Frog	2009	Keith David	Peter Del Vecho	
Falcon (Sam Wilson)	The Super Hero Squad Show	2009–2011	Alimi Ballard	Stan Lee	
Fifteen Cent	The Proud Family Movie	2005	Omarion Grandberry	Bruce W. Smith	
Fillmore (Cornelius C. Fillmore)	Fillmore!	2002–2004	Orlando Brown	Scott M. Gimple	
Lenny Flynn-Boyle	Fanboy & Chum Chum	2009-2014	Jeff Bennett	Eric Robles	
Lenny Flynn-Boyle	Fanboy & Chum Chum	2009-2014	Wyatt Cenac	Eric Robles	
Tucker Foley	Danny Phantom	2004–2007	Rickey D'Shon Collins	Butch Hartman	
Libby Folfax	The Adventures of Jimmy Neutron, Boy Genius	2002–2006	Crystal Scales	John A. Davis	
Lucius Fox	The Batman	2004-2008	Michael Goguen	Louis Gossett Jr.	
Lucius Fox	The Batman	2004-2008	Duane Capizzi	Louis Gossett Jr.	
Lucius Fox	Batman: Gotham Knight	2008	Kevin Michael Richardson	Shōjirō Nishimi	
Lucius Fox	Batman: Gotham Knight	2008	Kevin Michael Richardson	Futoshi Higashide	
Lucius Fox	Batman: Gotham Knight	2008	Kevin Michael Richardson	Hiroshi Morioka	
Lucius Fox	Batman: Gotham Knight	2008	Kevin Michael Richardson	Yasuhiro Aoki	
Lucius Fox	Batman: Gotham Knight	2008	Kevin Michael Richardson	Toshiyuki Kubooka	
Lucius Fox	Batman: Gotham Knight	2008	Kevin Michael Richardson	Jong-Sik Nam	
Lucius Fox	Batman: Gotham Knight	2008	Kevin Michael Richardson	Yoshiaki Kawajiri	
Huey Freeman	The Boondocks	2005-2014	Regina King	Aaron MacGruder	
Riley Freeman	The Boondocks	2005-2014	Regina King	Aaron MacGruder	
Robert Jebediah Freeman	The Boondocks	2005-2014	John Witherspoon	Aaron MacGruder	
Frozone (Lucius Best)	The Incredibles	2004	Samuel L. Jackson	Brad Bird	
Lizzie Garland	Phantom: Requiem for the Phantom	2009	Akeno Watanabe	Nitroplus	
Lizzie Garland	Phantom: Requiem for the Phantom	2009	Kadokawa Shoten	Shay Moore	
Nurse George	Up	2009	Donald Fullilove	Jonas Rivera	
Georgia	The Princess and the Frog	2009	Danielle Moné Truitt	Peter Del Vecho	
Goo	Foster's Home for Imaginary Friends	2004–2009	Grey DeLisle-Griffin	Craig McCracken	
Valerie Gray	Danny Phantom	2004–2007	Cree Summer	Butch Hartman	
Nubia Gross	The Proud Family	2001–2005	Raquel Lee	Bruce W. Smith	
Boogie Gus	Totally Spies!	2001-	Joseph Motiki	Vincent Chalvon-Demersay	
Boogie Gus	Totally Spies!	2001-	Joseph Motiki	David Michel	
Robert Hawkins	Static Shock	2000-2004	Kevin Michael Richardson	Dwayne McDuffie	
Robert Hawkins	Static Shock	2000-2004	Kevin Michael Richardson	Denys Cowan	
Robert Hawkins	Static Shock	2000-2004	Kevin Michael Richardson	Michael Davis	
Robert Hawkins	Static Shock	2000-2004	Kevin Michael Richardson	Derek Dingle	
Sharon Hawkins	Static Shock	2000-2004	Michele Morgan	Dwayne McDuffie	
Sharon Hawkins	Static Shock	2000-2004	Michele Morgan	Denys Cowan	
Sharon Hawkins	Static Shock	2000-2004	Michele Morgan	Michael Davis	
Sharon Hawkins	Static Shock	2000-2004	Michele Morgan	Derek Dingle	
Herald	Teen Titans	2003-2006	Khary Payton	Glen Murakami	
Herald	Teen Titans	2003-2006	Khary Payton	Sam Register	
Agura Ibaden	Hot Wheels Battle Force 5	2009–2011	Kathleen Barr	Mattel	
Iridessa	Tinker Bell	2008	Raven-Symoné	Bradley Raymond	
Iridessa	Tinker Bell and the Lost Treasure	2009	Raven-Symoné	Klay Hall	
Marik Ishtar	Yu-Gi-Oh! Duel Monsters	2000-2004	Tetsuya Iwanaga	Kunihisa Sugishima	
Marik Ishtar	Yu-Gi-Oh! Duel Monsters	2000-2004	Jamieson Price	Kunihisa Sugishima	
Marik Ishtar	Yu-Gi-Oh! Duel Monsters	2000-2004	Akiko Kimura	Kunihisa Sugishima	
Marik Ishtar	Yu-Gi-Oh! Duel Monsters	2000-2004	Jonathan Todd Ross	Kunihisa Sugishima	
Atsuko Jackson	Michiko & Hatchin	2008–2009	Maki Sakai	Manglobe	
Jackie	Cyberchase	2002-	Novie Edwards	Larry Jacobs	
Jackie	Cyberchase	2002-	Yvette Kaplan	Larry Jacobs	
Jackie	Cyberchase	2002-	Jason Groh	Larry Jacobs	
Jackie	Cyberchase	2002-	Brandon Lloyd	Larry Jacobs	
Jackie	Cyberchase	2002-	J. Meeka Stuart	Larry Jacobs	
James	The Princess and the Frog	2009	Terrance Howard	Peter Del Vecho	
Mayor Thomasina Jefferson	Static Shock	2000-2004	CCH Pounder	Dwayne McDuffie	
Mayor Thomasina Jefferson	Static Shock	2000-2004	CCH Pounder	Denys Cowan	
Mayor Thomasina Jefferson	Static Shock	2000-2004	CCH Pounder	Michael Davis	
Mayor Thomasina Jefferson	Static Shock	2000-2004	CCH Pounder	Derek Dingle	
Jermaine	Xiaolin Showdown	2003–2006	Lee Thompson Young	Christy Hui	
Trina Jessup	Static Shock	2000-2004	Sheryl Lee Ralph	Dwayne McDuffie	
Trina Jessup	Static Shock	2000-2004	Sheryl Lee Ralph	Denys Cowan	
Trina Jessup	Static Shock	2000-2004	Sheryl Lee Ralph	Michael Davis	
Trina Jessup	Static Shock	2000-2004	Sheryl Lee Ralph	Derek Dingle	
Jinga	Time Warp Trio	2005–2006	Alison Sealy Smith	Jon Scieszka	
Dijonay Jones	The Proud Family	2001–2005	Karen Malina White	Bruce W. Smith	
Juice	Justice League Unlimited	2004–2006	CCH Pounder	Bruce Timm	
Kangor	Static Shock	2000-2004	Kevin Michael Richardson	Dwayne McDuffie	
Kangor	Static Shock	2000-2004	Kevin Michael Richardson	Denys Cowan	
Kangor	Static Shock	2000-2004	Kevin Michael Richardson	Michael Davis	
Kangor	Static Shock	2000-2004	Kevin Michael Richardson	Derek Dingle	
Wizard Kelly	The Proud Family	2001–2005	Aries Spears	Bruce W. Smith	
Miranda Killgallen	As Told By Ginger	2000–2006	Cree Summer	Emily Kapnek	
Kirikou	Kirikou and the Wild Beasts	2005	Pierre-Ndoffé Sarr	Michel Ocelot	
Wade Load	Kim Possible	2002-2007	Tahj Mowry	Bob Schooley	
Wade Load	Kim Possible	2002-2007	Tahj Mowry	Mark McCorkle	
Colonel Lemak	The Zeta Project	2001–2002	Michael Dorn	Robert Goodman	
Myron Lewinski	The Proud Family	2001–2005	Marcus T. Paulk	Bruce W. Smith	
Foxxy Love	Drawn Together	2004-2007	Cree Summer	Dave Jeser	
Foxxy Love	Drawn Together	2004-2007	Cree Summer	Matt Silverstein	
Michiko Malandro	Michiko & Hatchin	2008-2009	Yōko Maki	Sayo Yamamoto	
Michiko Malandro	Michiko & Hatchin	2008-2009	Rina Hidaka	Sayo Yamamoto	
Michiko Malandro	Michiko & Hatchin	2008-2009	Monica Rial	Sayo Yamamoto	
Bob Makihara	Tenjho Tenge	2004	Shinichiro Miki	Toshifumi Kawase	
Bob Makihara	Tenjho Tenge	2004	Jamieson Price	Toshifumi Kawase	
Max	Scooby-Doo and the Alien Invaders	2000	Kevin Michael Richardson	Jim Stenstrum	
Franceska Mila Rose	Bleach	2004-2012	Sayori Ishizuka	Noriyuki Abe	
Franceska Mila Rose	Bleach	2004-2012	Erin Fitzgerald	Noriyuki Abe	
Monique	Kim Possible	2002-2007	Raven-Symoné	Bob Schooley	
Monique	Kim Possible	2002-2007	Raven-Symoné	Mark McCorkle	
Murphy	Superman: Doomsday	2007	Kimberly Brooks	Bruce Timm	
Mira Naigus	Soul Eater	2008–2009	Shay Moore	Atsushi Ōkubo	
Queen Niobe	Winx Club	2004–2009	Kimberly Brooks	Iginio Straffi	
Noah	Rugrats Pre-School Daze,	2008	Kimberly Brooks	Arlene Klasky	
Noah	Rugrats Pre-School Daze,	2008	Kimberly Brooks	Gábor Csupó	
Nona	The Weekenders	2000	Grey DeLisle-Griffin	Doug Langdale	
Villetta Nu	Code Geass	2006-2009	Akeno Watanabe	Gorō Taniguchi	
Villetta Nu	Code Geass	2006-2009	Megan Hollingshead	Gorō Taniguchi	
Numbuh Five	Codename: Kids Next Door	2002–2008	Cree Summer	Mr. Warburton	
Mama Odie	The Princess and the Frog	2009	Jenifer Lewis	Peter Del Vecho	
Omoi	Naruto: Shippuden	2007–2017	Ogie Banks	Masashi Kishimoto	
Jason Ozuma	Hajime no Ippo	2000	Kobayashi Masahiro	George Morikawa	
Paninya	Fullmetal Alchemist	2003-2004	Cynthia Cranz	Seiji Mizushima	
Paninya	Fullmetal Alchemist	2003-2004	Kyoko Hikami	Seiji Mizushima	
Darren Patterson	As Told By Ginger	2000–2006	Kenn Michael	Emily Kapnek	
Doctor Payne	The Proud Family	2001–2005	Kevin Michael Richardson	Bruce W. Smith	
Peabo	The Proud Family	2001–2005	Cree Summer	Bruce W. Smith	
BeBe and CeCe Proud	The Proud Family	2001–2005	Tara Strong	Bruce W. Smith	
Bobby Proud	The Proud Family	2001–2005	Cedric the Entertainer	Bruce W. Smith	
Oscar Proud	The Proud Family	2001–2005	Tommy Davidson	Bruce W. Smith	
Penny Proud	The Proud Family	2001–2005	Kyla Pratt	Bruce W. Smith	
Suga Mama Proud	The Proud Family	2001–2005	Jo Marie Payton	Bruce W. Smith	
Trudy Proud	The Proud Family	2001–2005	Paula Jai Parker	Bruce W. Smith	
Puff	Static Shock	2000-2004	Kimberly Brooks	Dwayne McDuffie	
Puff	Static Shock	2000-2004	Kimberly Brooks	Denys Cowan	
Puff	Static Shock	2000-2004	Kimberly Brooks	Michael Davis	
Puff	Static Shock	2000-2004	Kimberly Brooks	Derek Dingle	
Quincy	Little Einsteins	2005–2009	Aiden Pompey	Douglas Wood	
Bernie Rast	Static Shock	2000-2004	Kevin Michael Richardson	Dwayne McDuffie	
Bernie Rast	Static Shock	2000-2004	Kevin Michael Richardson	Denys Cowan	
Bernie Rast	Static Shock	2000-2004	Kevin Michael Richardson	Michael Davis	
Bernie Rast	Static Shock	2000-2004	Kevin Michael Richardson	Derek Dingle	
Ed Reiss	Justice League	2001–2004	Phil LaMarr	Bruce Timm	
Robbie Robertson	The Spectacular Spider-Man	2008-2009	Phil LaMarr	Greg Weisman	
Robbie Robertson	The Spectacular Spider-Man	2008-2009	Phil LaMarr	Victor Cook	
Rubberband Man (Adam Evans)	Static Shock	2000-2004	Kadeem Hardison	Dwayne McDuffie	
Rubberband Man (Adam Evans)	Static Shock	2000-2004	Kadeem Hardison	Denys Cowan	
Rubberband Man (Adam Evans)	Static Shock	2000-2004	Kadeem Hardison	Michael Davis	
Rubberband Man (Adam Evans)	Static Shock	2000-2004	Kadeem Hardison	Derek Dingle	
Kilik Rung	Soul Eater	2008–2009	Kenichi Suzumura	Atsushi Ōkubo	
Agent Rush	The Zeta Project	2001-2002	Dominique Jennings	Robert Goodman	
Agent Rush	The Zeta Project	2001-2002	Erika Alexander	Robert Goodman	
Sasha	Bratz	2005-2008	Tia Mowry	Carter Bryant	
Sasha	Bratz	2005-2008	Dorian Bell	Carter Bryant	
Mrs. Saunders	Justice League	2001–2004	Kimberly Brooks	Bruce Timm	
Scar	Fullmetal Alchemist	2003-2004	Ryōtarō Okiayu	Seiji Mizushima	
Scar	Fullmetal Alchemist	2003-2004	Kenta Miyake	Seiji Mizushima	
Scar	Fullmetal Alchemist: Brotherhood	2009-2010	Yasuhiro Irie	Dameon Clarke	
Scar	Fullmetal Alchemist: Brotherhood	2009-2010	Yasuhiro Irie	J. Michael Tatum	
She-Bang (Shenice Vale)	Static Shock	2000-2004	Rosslynn Taylor Jordan	Dwayne McDuffie	
She-Bang (Shenice Vale)	Static Shock	2000-2004	Rosslynn Taylor Jordan	Denys Cowan	
She-Bang (Shenice Vale)	Static Shock	2000-2004	Rosslynn Taylor Jordan	Michael Davis	
She-Bang (Shenice Vale)	Static Shock	2000-2004	Rosslynn Taylor Jordan	Derek Dingle	
Madelyn Spaulding	Static Shock	2000-2004	Kimberly Brooks	Dwayne McDuffie	
Madelyn Spaulding	Static Shock	2000-2004	Kimberly Brooks	Denys Cowan	
Madelyn Spaulding	Static Shock	2000-2004	Kimberly Brooks	Michael Davis	
Madelyn Spaulding	Static Shock	2000-2004	Kimberly Brooks	Derek Dingle	
Yoruichi Shihōin	Bleach	2004-2012	Satsuki Yukino	Noriyuki Abe	
Yoruichi Shihōin	Bleach	2004-2012	Wendee Lee	Noriyuki Abe	
Shout	The Fresh Beat Band	2009-2013	Thomas Hobson	Nadine van der Velde	
Shout	The Fresh Beat Band	2009-2013	Thomas Hobson	Scott Kraft	
Silver Sentry	Teenage Mutant Ninja Turtles	2003–2009	Marc Diraison	Lloyd Goldfine	
Simone	As Told by Ginger	2000-2006	Erica Luttrell	Emily Kapnek	
Simone	The Wedding Frame	2000-2006	Erica Luttrell	2004	
Sita	The Secret Saturdays	2008–2010	Erica Luttrell	Jay Stephens	
Soul Power (Morris Grant)	Static Shock	2000-2004	Brock Peters	Dwayne McDuffie	
Soul Power (Morris Grant)	Static Shock	2000-2004	Brock Peters	Denys Cowan	
Soul Power (Morris Grant)	Static Shock	2000-2004	Brock Peters	Michael Davis	
Soul Power (Morris Grant)	Static Shock	2000-2004	Brock Peters	Derek Dingle	
Sparky (Phillip Rollins)	Static Shock	2000-2004	Rodney Saulsberry	Derek Dingle	
Spyke (Evan Daniels)	X-Men: Evolution	2000-2003	Neil Denis	John Bush	
Spyke (Evan Daniels)	X-Men: Evolution	2000-2003	Neil Denis	John W. Hyde	
Spyke (Evan Daniels)	X-Men: Evolution	2000-2003	Neil Denis	Jon Vein	
Static (Virgil Hawkins)	Static Shock	2000-2004	Phil LaMarr	Dwayne McDuffie	
Static (Virgil Hawkins)	Static Shock	2000-2004	Phil LaMarr	Denys Cowan	
Static (Virgil Hawkins)	Static Shock	2000-2004	Phil LaMarr	Michael Davis	
Static (Virgil Hawkins)	Static Shock	2000-2004	Phil LaMarr	Derek Dingle	
John Stewart (Green Lantern)	Static Shock	2000-2004	Phil LaMarr	Derek Dingle	
John Stewart (Green Lantern)	Justice League	2001–2004	Phil LaMarr	Bruce Timm	
John Stewart (Green Lantern)	Justice League Unlimited	2004–2006	Phil LaMarr	Bruce Timm	
Storm	X-Men: Evolution	2000-2003	Kirsten Williamson	Marty Isenberg	
Storm	X-Men: Evolution	2000-2003	Kirsten Williamson	Robert N. Skir	
Storm	X-Men: Evolution	2000-2003	Kirsten Williamson	David Wise	
Storm	The Super Hero Squad Show	2009–2011	Cree Summer	Stan Lee	
Storm	Wolverine And The X-Men	2009	Susan Dalian	Craig Kyle	
Storm	Wolverine And The X-Men	2009	Susan Dalian	Greg Johnson	
Dr. Joshua Strongbear Sweet	Atlantis: Milo's Return	2003	Phil Morris	Tad Stones	
Dr. Joshua Strongbear Sweet	Atlantis: The Lost Empire	2001	Phil Morris	Don Hahn	
King Teredor	Winx Club	2004–2009	Obba Babatunde	Iginio Straffi	
Mister Terrific	Justice League Unlimited	2004–2006	Bruce Timm	Michael Beach	
Tiana	The Princess and the Frog	2009	Elizabeth Dampier	Peter Del Vecho	
Tiana	The Princess and the Frog	2009	Anika Noni Rose	Peter Del Vecho	
Kaname Tosen	Bleach	2004–2012	Toshiyuki Morikawa	Noriyuki Abe	
Jackie Tristan	Bleach	2004–2012	Atsuko Yuya	Noriyuki Abe	
Jackie Tristan	Bleach	2004–2012	Julie Ann Taylor	Noriyuki Abe	
Donna Tubbs-Brown	The Cleveland Show	2009-2013	Sanaa Lathan	Seth MacFarlane	
Donna Tubbs-Brown	The Cleveland Show	2009-2013	Sanaa Lathan	Richard Appel	
Donna Tubbs-Brown	The Cleveland Show	2009-2013	Sanaa Lathan	Mike Henry	
Rallo Tubbs	The Cleveland Show	2009-2013	Mike Henry	Mike Henry	
Roberta Tubbs	The Cleveland Show	2009-2013	Nia Long	Mike Henry	
Roberta Tubbs	The Cleveland Show	2009-2013	Reagan Gomez-Preston	Mike Henry	
Jefferson Twilight	The Venture Bros.	2004–2018	Charles Parnell	Jackson Publick	
Dolores Vale	Static Shock	2000-2004	Pamela Tyson	Dwayne McDuffie	
Dolores Vale	Static Shock	2000-2004	Pamela Tyson	Denys Cowan	
Dolores Vale	Static Shock	2000-2004	Pamela Tyson	Michael Davis	
Dolores Vale	Static Shock	2000-2004	Pamela Tyson	Derek Dingle	
Jonathan Vale	Static Shock	2000-2004	Phil Morris	Dwayne McDuffie	
Jonathan Vale	Static Shock	2000-2004	Phil Morris	Denys Cowan	
Jonathan Vale	Static Shock	2000-2004	Phil Morris	Michael Davis	
Jonathan Vale	Static Shock	2000-2004	Phil Morris	Derek Dingle	
Mari McCabe (Vixen)	Justice League Unlimited	2004–2006	Gina Torres	Bruce Timm	
Mari McCabe (Vixen)	Batman: The Brave and the Bold	2008-2011	Cree Summer	James Tucker	
Mari McCabe (Vixen)	Batman: The Brave and the Bold	2008-2011	Cree Summer	Michael Jelenic	
Amanda Waller	Justice League Unlimited	2004–2006	CCH Pounder	Bruce Timm	
Amanda Waller	Superman/Batman: Public Enemies	2009	CCH Pounder	Sam Liu	
Warhawk (Rex Stewart)	Justice League Unlimited	2004–2009	Peter Onorati	Bruce Timm	
Sticky Webb	The Proud Family	2001–2005	Orlando Brown	Bruce W. Smith	
Kenny West	The Cleveland Show	2009-2013	Kanye West	Seth MacFarlane	
Kenny West	The Cleveland Show	2009-2013	Kanye West	Richard Appel	
Kenny West	The Cleveland Show	2009-2013	Kanye West	Mike Henry	
Mr. White	Johnny Test	2005–2014	Scott McNeil	Scott Fellows	
Abigail "Abbey" Wilson	The Replacements	2006-2009	Erica Hubbard	Dan Santat	
Abigail "Abbey" Wilson	The Replacements	2006-2009	Tempestt Bledsoe	Dan Santat	
Mace Windu	Star Wars: Clone Wars	2003–2005	Terrence C. Carson	Genndy Tartakovsky	
Mace Windu	Star Wars: The Clone Wars	2008-2014 (Note: the last season was in 2020.)	Terrence C. Carson	George Lucas	
Dr. Skippy Yamposki	The Weekenders	2000	Phil LaMarr	Doug Langdale	

== See also ==
- List of black animated characters: 1990s
- List of black animated characters: 2010s
- List of black animated characters: 2020s
- African characters in comics
- Ethnic stereotypes in comics
- List of black superheroes
- List of black video game characters
