= List of black animated characters: 2020s =

This list of black animated characters lists fictional characters found on animated television series and in motion pictures, from 2020 to present. The Black people in this list include African American animated characters and other characters of Sub-Saharan African descent or populations characterized by dark skin color (a definition that also includes certain populations in Oceania, the southern West Asia, and the Siddi of southern South Asia).

The names are organized alphabetically by surname (i.e. last name), or by single name if the character does not have a surname.

== List ==
| Character | Title | Duration | Voice actor | Creator | Ref. |
|---|---|---|---|---|---|
| Aika | Pretty Pretty Please I Don't Want to Be a Magical Girl | 2025-present | Anairis Quiñones | Kiana Khansmith | |
| Akeya | Eyes of Wakanda | 2025 | Patricia Belcher | Todd Harris | |
| Alanna | Ariel | 2025- | Jessica Mikayla Adams | Wild Canary Animation | |
| Elder Alapani | Iyanu: Child of Wonder | 2025- | Ike Ononye | Roye Okupe | |
| Andra | Masters of the Universe: Revelation | 2021-2024 | Tiffany Smith | Kevin Smith | |
| Andy | Invincible Fight Girl | 2024 | Sydney Mikayla | Juston Gordon-Montgomery | |
| Princess Ariel | Ariel | 2025- | Mykal-Michelle Harris | Wild Canary Animation | |
| Aunt P | Invincible Fight Girl | 2024 | Rolonda Watts | Juston Gordon-Montgomery | |
| Ayanna | Ariel | 2025- | Dana Heath | Wild Canary Animation | |
| B'Kai / Memnon | Eyes of Wakanda | 2025 | Larry Herron | Todd Harris | |
| Babaluaye | Tomb Raider: The Legend of Lara Croft | 2024-2025 | Elijah St. John | Tasha Huo | |
| Babu | Super Sema | 2021 | Unknown | Lupita Nyong'o | |
| Badger | My Adventures with Superman | 2023- | Darrell Brown | Jake Wyatt | |
| Badger | My Adventures with Superman | 2023- | Darrell Brown | Brendan Clougher | |
| Badger | My Adventures with Superman | 2023- | Darrell Brown | Josie Campbell | |
| Basha | Eyes of Wakanda | 2025 | Jacques Colimon | Todd Harris | |
| Jacques Beau | Velma | 2023-2024 | Karl-Anthony Towns | Charlie Grandy | |
| Bem | BEM: Become Human | 2020 | Katsuyuki Konishi | Hiroshi Ikehata | |
| Amber Justine Bennett | Invincible | 2021- | Zazie Beetz | Robert Kirkman | |
| Billy | My Adventures with Superman | 2023- | Riley Looc | Jake Wyatt | |
| Billy | My Adventures with Superman | 2023- | Riley Looc | Brendan Clougher | |
| Billy | My Adventures with Superman | 2023- | Riley Looc | Josie Campbell | |
| Biyi | Iyanu: Child of Wonder | 2025- | Okey Jude | Roye Okupe | |
| Black Panther / T'Challa | Spidey and His Amazing Friends | 2021- | Tru Valentino | Harrison Wilcox | |
| Black Panther / T'Challa | What If...? | 2021-2024 | Chadwick Boseman | A. C. Bradley | |
| Black Panther | Eyes of Wakanda | 2025 | Anika Noni Rose | Todd Harris | |
| Black Samson | Invincible | 2021- | Khary Payton | Robert Kirkman | |
| Blade Knight / Eric Brooks | Marvel Zombies | 2025- | Todd Williams | Zeb Wells | |
| Linda Blake | Velma | 2023-2024 | Wanda Sykes | Charlie Grandy | |
| Mark Bowman | The Mitchells vs. the Machines | 2021 | Eric Andre | Mike Rianda | |
| Bree | Inside Out 2 | 2024 | Sumayyah Nuriddin-Green | Kelsey Mann | |
| Sabo Brok / Terry | My Dad the Bounty Hunter | 2023-2024 | Laz Alonso | Everett Downing | |
| Sabo Brok / Terry | My Dad the Bounty Hunter | 2023-2024 | Laz Alonso | Patrick Harpin | |
| Brooklyn | Moon Girl and Devil Dinosaur | 2023-2025 | Indya Moore | Steve Loter | |
| Callie | My Father's Dragon | 2022 | Yara Shahidi | Nora Twomey | |
| Agent Capano | Common Side Effects | 2025- | Joseph Lee Anderson | Joseph Bennett | |
| Agent Capano | Common Side Effects | 2025- | Joseph Lee Anderson | Steve Hely | |
| Carla | Hailey's On It! | 2023-2024 | Natasha Rothwell | Devin Bunje | |
| Carla | Hailey's On It! | 2023-2024 | Natasha Rothwell | Nick Stanton | |
| Cecily | Common Side Effects | 2025- | Sydney Poitier | Joseph Bennett | |
| Cecily | Common Side Effects | 2025- | Sydney Poitier | Steve Hely | |
| Chalice | Pokémon Horizons: The Series | 2023-2024 | Shara Kirby | Daiki Tomiyasu | |
| Chalice | Pokémon Horizons – The Search for Laqua | 2024-2025 | Shara Kirby | Daiki Tomiyasu | |
| Chalice | Pokémon Horizons – Rising Hope | 2025-2026 | Shara Kirby | Daiki Tomiyasu | |
| Romy Chandler | Batman: Caped Crusader | 2024- | Kimberly Brooks | Bruce Timm | |
| Charlotte | Birdie Wing | 2022–2023 | Takayuki Inagaki | Yu Asakawa | |
| Chet | Jentry Chau vs. the Underworld | 2024 | Jonathan Melo | Echo Wu | |
| Clamp Champ | Masters of the Universe: Revelation | 2021-2024 | Method Man | Kevin Smith | |
| Tantie Chantale | Ariel | 2024- | Danni Washington | Wild Canary Animation | |
| Rocky Cocoa | Zuzubaland | 2020–2021 | Zeno Robinson | Unknown | |
| Michael Collins | The Proud Family: Louder and Prouder | 2022- | EJ Johnson | Bruce W. Smith | |
| Conner | Hoppers | 2026 | Sam Richardson | Daniel Chong | |
| Josephine "Joey" Coupet | Pantheon | 2022-2023 | Anika Noni Rose | Craig Silverstein | |
| Pasha Coupet | Pantheon | 2022-2023 | Anika Noni Rose | Craig Silverstein | |
| Curley | Soul | 2020 | Ahmir Khalib Thompson | Dana Murray | |
| Curtis | My Adventures with Superman | 2023- | Darrell Brown | Jake Wyatt | |
| Curtis | My Adventures with Superman | 2023- | Darrell Brown | Brendan Clougher | |
| Curtis | My Adventures with Superman | 2023- | Darrell Brown | Josie Campbell | |
| President Andre Curtis | President Curtis | 2026-present | Keith David | James Siciliano | |
| President Andre Curtis | President Curtis | 2026-present | Keith David | Dan Harmon | |
| Damian | My Dad the Bounty Hunter | 2023-2024 | Bevin Bright | Everett Downing | |
| Damian | My Dad the Bounty Hunter | 2023-2024 | Bevin Bright | Patrick Harpin | |
| Banth Dar | Green Lantern: Beware My Power | 2022 | Mara Junot | Jeff Wamester | |
| Alamzapam Davis | Nimona | 2023 | Indya Moore | Nick Bruno | |
| Alamzapam Davis | Nimona | 2023 | Indya Moore | Troy Quane | |
| Dax | RoboGobo | 2025- | Ja'Siah Young | Jeff "Swampy" Marsh | |
| Deadshot | Suicide Squad Isekai | 2024 | Jovan Jackson | Eri Osada | |
| Deadshot | Suicide Squad Isekai | 2024 | Reigo Yamaguchi | Eri Osada | |
| DeAndre | Hailey's On It! | 2023-2024 | John Eric Bentley | Devin Bunje | |
| DeAndre | Hailey's On It! | 2023-2024 | John Eric Bentley | Nick Stanton | |
| Denise | Marvel Zombies | 2025- | Debra Wilson | Zeb Wells | |
| Derwin | The Owl House | 2020–2023 | Zeno Robinson | Dana Terrace | |
| Dez | Soul | 2020 | Donnell Rawlings | Dana Murray | |
| Coco Diablo | Trick or Treat Scooby-Doo! | 2022 | Myrna Velasco | Audie Harrison | |
| Dianne | The Ghost and Molly McGee | 2021-2024 | Yvette Nicole Brown | Bill Motz | |
| Dianne | The Ghost and Molly McGee | 2021-2024 | Yvette Nicole Brown | Bob Roth | |
| Triplicate Girl (Luornu Durgo) | Legion of Super-Heroes | 2023 | Daisy Lightfoot | Jeff Wamester | |
| Triplicate Girl (Luornu Durgo) | Legion of Super-Heroes | 2023 | Daisy Lightfoot | Josie Campbell | |
| Dynamis | Food Wars!: Shokugeki no Soma | 2015-2020 | Melanie Burke | Yoshitomo Yonetani | |
| Dynamis | Food Wars!: Shokugeki no Soma | 2015-2020 | Natsumi Fujiwara | Yoshitomo Yonetani | |
| Ebo | Eyes of Wakanda | 2025 | Isaac Robinson-Smith | Todd Harris | |
| Ekko | Arcane | 2021-2024 | Miles Brown | Christian Linke | |
| Ekko | Arcane | 2021-2024 | Reed Shannon | Alex Yee | |
| Elise | Adventure Time: Distant Lands | 2020–2021 | Erica Luttrell | Adam Muto | |
| Emi | Iyanu: Child of Wonder | 2025- | Shaffy Bello | Roye Okupe | |
| Steven Erickson | Invincible: Atom Eve | 2023 | Lance Reddick | Robert Kirkman | |
| Eureka | Eureka! | 2022-2023 | Ruth Righi | Norton Virgien | |
| Eureka | Eureka! | 2022-2023 | Ruth Righi | Niamh Sharkey | |
| Eshu | Tomb Raider: The Legend of Lara Croft | 2024-2025 | O-T Fagbenle | Tasha Huo | |
| Fernie | Ariel | 2024- | Cruz Flateau | Wild Canary Animation | |
| Flare | Super Crooks | 2021 | Michael Scott | Mark Millar | |
| Flare | Super Crooks | 2021 | Michael Scott | Leinil Francis Yu | |
| Flare II | Super Crooks | 2021 | Kacie Rogers | Leinil Francis Yu | |
| Detective Arnold Flass | Batman: Caped Crusader | 2024- | Gary Anthony Williams | Bruce Timm | |
| Flora | High Guardian Spice | 2021 | Cindy Robinson | Raye Rodriguez | |
| Flo | Kid Cosmic | 2021–2022 | Kim Yarbrough | Craig McCracken | |
| Forecast | Super Crooks | 2021 | Zeno Robinson | Mark Millar | |
| Forecast | Super Crooks | 2021 | Zeno Robinson | Leinil Francis Yu | |
| Lucius Fox | Batman: The Doom That Came to Gotham | 2023 | Tim Russ | Christopher Berkeley | |
| Lucius Fox | Batman: The Doom That Came to Gotham | 2023 | Tim Russ | Sam Liu | |
| Lucius Fox | Batman: Caped Crusader | 2024- | Bumper Robinson | Bruce Timm | |
| Francis | StuGo | 2025 | Gabourey Sidibe | Ryan Gillis | |
| Franklin | The Snoopy Show | 2021-2023 | Caleb Bellavance | Charles M. Schulz | |
| Franklin | The Snoopy Show | 2021-2023 | Christian Dal Dosso | Charles M. Schulz | |
| Beckett Mariner Freeman | Star Trek: Lower Decks | 2020-2024 | Tawny Newsome | Mike McMahan | |
| Carol Freeman | Star Trek: Lower Decks | 2020-2024 | Dawnn Lewis | Mike McMahan | |
| Nick Fury | What If...? | 2021-2024 | Samuel L. Jackson | A. C. Bradley | |
| Joe Gardner | Soul | 2020 | Jamie Foxx | Dana Murray | |
| Libba Gardner | Soul | 2020 | Phylicia Rashad | Dana Murray | |
| Gazelle | Princess Principal: Crown Handler | 2021 | Melanie Burke | Masaki Tachibana | |
| Gazelle | Princess Principal: Crown Handler | 2021 | Yuko Iida | Masaki Tachibana | |
| Phee Genoa | Star Wars: The Bad Batch | 2021-2024 | Wanda Sykes | Dave Filoni | |
| Gerald | Lil Kev | 2025- | Cree Summer | Kevin Hart | |
| Gigi | Velma | 2022-2024 | Yvonne Orji | Charlie Grandy | |
| Sgt. Gigisdad | Velma | 2022-2024 | Gary Anthony Williams | Charlie Grandy | |
| Stephen Gold | Pantheon | 2022-2023 | Tunde Adebimpe | Craig Silverstein | |
| Stella Gonzales | Jentry Chau vs. the Underworld | 2024 | Cristina Milizia | Echo Wu | |
| Barbara Gordon | Batman: Caped Crusader | 2024- | Krystal Joy Brown | Bruce Timm | |
| Grandma | My Dad the Bounty Hunter | 2023-2024 | Leslie Uggams | Everett Downing | |
| Grandma | My Dad the Bounty Hunter | 2023-2024 | Leslie Uggams | Patrick Harpin | |
| Al Granger | Spirit Untamed | 2021 | Andre Braugher | Elaine Bogan | |
| Pru Granger | Spirit Untamed | 2021 | Marsai Martin | Elaine Bogan | |
| Conrad Grant | Karma's World | 2021-2022 | Chris "Ludacris" Bridges | Chris "Ludacris" Bridges | |
| Karma Grant | Karma's World | 2021-2022 | Asiahn Bryant | Chris "Ludacris" Bridges | |
| Keys Grant | Karma's World | 2021-2022 | Camden Coley | Chris "Ludacris" Bridges | |
| Lillie-Carter Grant | Karma's World | 2021-2022 | Danielle Brooks | Chris "Ludacris" Bridges | |
| Grayskull | Masters of the Universe: Revelation | 2021-2024 | Dennis Haysbert | Kevin Smith | |
| Gregory | Hailey's On It! | 2023-2024 | Devin Bunje | Phil LaMarr | |
| Gregory | Hailey's On It! | 2023-2024 | Nick Stanton | Phil LaMarr | |
| Eadwulf Grieve | The Mighty Nein | 2025- | RedChild | Tasha Huo | |
| Nubia Gross | The Proud Family: Louder and Prouder | 2022- | Raquel Lee Boulleau | Bruce W. Smith | |
| Douglas "Doug" Hadine | Lazarus | 2025 | Makoto Furukawa | Shinichirō Watanabe | |
| Douglas "Doug" Hadine | Lazarus | 2025 | Jovan Jackson | Shinichirō Watanabe | |
| Juha Hamilail | Birdie Wing | 2022–2023 | Takayuki Inagaki | Yu Asakawa | |
| Professor Harkone | High Guardian Spice | 2021 | Anthony Brandon Walker | Raye Rodriguez | |
| Heimdall | What If...? | 2021-2024 | Idris Elba | A. C. Bradley | |
| Henry | Lil Kev | 2025- | Gerald Johnson | Kevin Hart | |
| Marcus Holloway | Captain Laserhawk: A Blood Dragon Remix | 2023 | Mark Ebelue | Adi Shankar | |
| Kendra Hooper | Long Story Short | 2025 | Nicole Byer | Raphael Bob-Waksberg | |
| Oz Husaini | Quantum Heroes Dinoster | 2023- | Cenophia Mitchell | Nate Begle | |
| Idariji | Tomb Raider: The Legend of Lara Croft | 2024-2025 | Logan Alarcon-Poucel | Tasha Huo | |
| Iggy | Batman: Caped Crusader | 2024- | Gary Anthony Williams | Bruce Timm | |
| Ireti | Tomb Raider: The Legend of Lara Croft | 2024-2025 | Erica Luttrell | Tasha Huo | |
| Ironheart / Riri Williams | What If...? | 2021-2024 | Dominique Thorne | A. C. Bradley | |
| Ironheart / Riri Williams | Marvel Zombies | 2025 | Dominique Thorne | Zeb Wells | |
| Iyanu | Iyanu: Child of Wonder | 2025- | Serah Johnson | Roye Okupe | |
| Jabari | Entergalactic | 2022 | Kid Cudi | Kid Cudi | |
| Jackie | Action Pack | 2022 | Kimberly Brooks | William Harper | |
| Miss Jackson | Hailey's On It! | 2023-2024 | Cynthia McWilliams | Devin Bunje | |
| Miss Jackson | Hailey's On It! | 2023-2024 | Cynthia McWilliams | Nick Stanton | |
| Jade | The Mitchells vs. the Machines | 2021 | Sasheer Zamata | Mike Rianda | |
| Janie | Harriet the Spy | 2021-2023 | Kimberly Brooks | Will McRobb | |
| Captain Jarrett | The Legend of Vox Machina | 2022- | Eugene Byrd | Chris Prynoski | |
| Jenny | The Guava Juice Show | 2021- | Bethany Brown | Daniel Williams | |
| Jessica | Birdie Wing | 2022–2023 | Takayuki Inagaki | Yu Asakawa | |
| Big Jessica | Jessica's Big Little World | 2022-2023 | Ozioma Akagha | Matt Burnett | |
| Big Jessica | Jessica's Big Little World | 2022-2023 | Ozioma Akagha | Tiffany Ford | |
| Big Jessica | Jessica's Big Little World | 2022-2023 | Ozioma Akagha | Ben Levin | |
| Jewels | Ariel | 2024- | Amari McCoy | Wild Canary Animation | |
| Flip Johnson | My Adventures with Superman | 2023- | Azuri Hardy-Jones | Jake Wyatt | |
| Flip Johnson | My Adventures with Superman | 2023- | Azuri Hardy-Jones | Brendan Clougher | |
| Flip Johnson | My Adventures with Superman | 2023- | Azuri Hardy-Jones | Josie Campbell | |
| Tom Johnson | Shenmue | 2022 | Shannon Reed | Yu Suzuki | |
| Dijonay Jones | The Proud Family: Louder and Prouder | 2022- | Karen Malina White | Bruce W. Smith | |
| Jo | Kid Cosmic | 2021–2022 | Amanda Celine Miller | Craig McCracken | |
| JT | Hailey's On It! | 2023-2024 | Brandon Mychal Smith | Devin Bunje | |
| JT | Hailey's On It! | 2023-2024 | Brandon Mychal Smith | Nick Stanton | |
| Jules | Arcane | 2021-2024 | Mara Junot | Christian Linke | |
| Jules | Arcane | 2021-2024 | Mara Junot | Alex Yee | |
| Junree | Moon Girl and Devil Dinosaur | 2023-2025 | Myha'a Herrold | Steve Loter | |
| Kai | Win or Lose | 2025 | Chanel Stewart | Carrie Hobson | |
| Kai | Win or Lose | 2025 | Chanel Stewart | Michael Yates | |
| Kanfo | Iyanu: Child of Wonder | 2025- | Blossom Chukwujekwu | Roye Okupe | |
| Keeper Yennen | The Legend of Vox Machina | 2022- | Gina Torres | Chris Prynoski | |
| Kehinde | Tomb Raider: The Legend of Lara Croft | 2024-2025 | Erica Luttrell | Tasha Huo | |
| Kennedy | Hailey's On It! | 2023-2024 | Shara Kirby | Devin Bunje | |
| Kennedy | Hailey's On It! | 2023-2024 | Shara Kirby | Nick Stanton | |
| Kevin | Lil Kev | 2025- | Kevin Hart | Kevin Hart | |
| Killmonger | What If...? | 2021-2024 | Michael B. Jordan | A. C. Bradley | |
| Nate Knight | Nimona | 2023 | RuPaul | Nick Bruno | |
| Nate Knight | Nimona | 2023 | RuPaul | Troy Quane | |
| Korath | What If...? | 2021-2024 | Djimon Hounsou | A. C. Bradley | |
| Krash | Knights of Guinevere | 2025-present | Zeno Robinson | Dana Terrace | |
| Krash | Knights of Guinevere | 2025-present | Zeno Robinson | Zach Marcus | |
| Krash | Knights of Guinevere | 2025-present | Zeno Robinson | John Bailey Owen | |
| Kuda | Eyes of Wakanda | 2025 | Steve Toussaint | Todd Harris | |
| Ky | Entergalactic | 2022 | Ty Dolla Sign | Kid Cudi | |
| Ladi | Oh My God... Yes! | 2025 | Xosha Roquemore | Adele "Supreme" Williams | |
| Adria Lafayette | Moon Girl and Devil Dinosaur | 2023-2025 | Sasheer Zamata | Steve Loter | |
| James Lafayette Jr. | Moon Girl and Devil Dinosaur | 2023-2025 | Jermaine Fowler | Steve Loter | |
| James "Pops" Lafayette Sr. | Moon Girl and Devil Dinosaur | 2023-2025 | Gary Anthony Williams | Steve Loter | |
| Lunella Lafayette (Moon Girl) | Moon Girl and Devil Dinosaur | 2023-2025 | Diamond White | Steve Loter | |
| Miriam "Mimi" Lafayette | Moon Girl and Devil Dinosaur | 2023-2025 | Alfre Woodard | Steve Loter | |
| Laura | Jessica's Big Little World | 2022-2023 | Afi Ekulona | Matt Burnett | |
| Laura | Jessica's Big Little World | 2022-2023 | Afi Ekulona | Tiffany Ford | |
| Laura | Jessica's Big Little World | 2022-2023 | Afi Ekulona | Ben Levin | |
| Francis "KG" Leibowitz-Jenkins | The Proud Family: Louder and Prouder | 2022- | Artist "A Boogie" Dubose | Bruce W. Smith | |
| Maya Leibowitz-Jenkins | The Proud Family: Louder and Prouder | 2022- | Keke Palmer | Bruce W. Smith | |
| Randall Leibowitz-Jenkins | The Proud Family: Louder and Prouder | 2022- | Billy Porter | Bruce W. Smith | |
| Myron Lewinski | The Proud Family: Louder and Prouder | 2022- | Marcus T. Paulk | Bruce W. Smith | |
| Lisa | My Dad the Bounty Hunter | 2023-2024 | Priah Ferguson | Everett Downing | |
| Lisa | My Dad the Bounty Hunter | 2023-2024 | Priah Ferguson | Patrick Harpin | |
| Lonnie Lincoln | Your Friendly Neighborhood Spider-Man | 2025- | Eugene Byrd | Jeff Trammell | |
| Lotus | Pantheon | 2022-2023 | Toks Olagundoye | Craig Silverstein | |
| Stephen Love | Young Love | 2023 | Scott Mescudi | Matthew A. Cherry | |
| Zuri Young Love | Young Love | 2023 | Brooke Monroe Conaway | Matthew A. Cherry | |
| Dr. Lullah | StuGo | 2025 | Lorraine Toussaint | Ryan Gillis | |
| Lulu | Soul | 2020 | Rhodessa Jones | Dana Murray | |
| Lex Luthor | Kite Man: Hell Yeah! | 2024 | Lance Reddick, Amuche Chukudebelu | Patrick Schumacker | |
| Lex Luthor | Kite Man: Hell Yeah! | 2024 | Lance Reddick, Amuche Chukudebelu | Justin Halpern | |
| Lex Luthor | Kite Man: Hell Yeah! | 2024 | Lance Reddick, Amuche Chukudebelu | Dean Lorey | |
| Jonah Maiava | Tomb Raider: The Legend of Lara Croft | 2024-2025 | Earl Babylon | Tasha Huo | |
| Marisol | Lil Kev | 2025- | Anjelah Nicole Johnson | Kevin Hart | |
| Uncle Marty | Hailey's On It! | 2023-2024 | John Eric Bentley | Devin Bunje | |
| Uncle Marty | Hailey's On It! | 2023-2024 | John Eric Bentley | Nick Stanton | |
| Marty | Hey A.J.! | 2026- | Martellus Bennett | Leo Wilson | |
| MB | Super Sema | 2021 | Seth Prewitt | Lupita Nyong'o | |
| Mari Jiwe McCabe / Vixen | Green Lantern: Beware My Power | 2022 | Keesha Sharp | Jeff Wamester | |
| Mari Jiwe McCabe / Vixen | Justice League x RWBY: Super Heroes & Huntsmen | 2023 | Ozioma Akagha | Kerry Shawcross | |
| Mari Jiwe McCabe / Vixen | Justice League: Crisis on Infinite Earths | 2024 | Keesha Sharp | Jeff Wamester | |
| Meadow | Entergalactic | 2022 | Jessica Williams | Kid Cudi | |
| Mel Medarda | Arcane | 2021-2024 | Toks Olagundoye | Christian Linke | |
| Mel Medarda | Arcane | 2021-2024 | Imogen Faires | Alex Yee | |
| Benson Mekler | Kipo and the Age of Wonderbeasts | 2020 | Coy Stewart | Radford Sechrist | |
| Melanie | Fe@rLeSS_ | 2020 | Yara Shahidi | Cory Edwards | |
| Melba | Soul | 2020 | Margo Hal | Dana Murray | |
| Ambessa Merdarda | Arcane | 2021-2024 | Ellen Thomas | Christian Linke | |
| Ambessa Merdarda | Arcane | 2021-2024 | Ellen Thomas | Alex Yee | |
| Mia | Duncanville | 2020-2022 | Rashida Jones | Mike Scully | |
| Mia | Duncanville | 2020-2022 | Rashida Jones | Julie Thacker | |
| Mia | Duncanville | 2020-2022 | Rashida Jones | Amy Poehler | |
| Linton Midnite | Batman: Caped Crusader | 2024- | Cedric Yarbrough | Bruce Timm | |
| Mika | Lycoris Recoil | 2022 | Kosuke Sakaki | Shingo Adachi | |
| Milo | Dragon Striker | 2026- | Yeukayi Ushe | Sylvain Dos Santos | |
| Milo | Dragon Striker | 2026- | Yeukayi Ushe | Charles Lefebvre | |
| Mr. Mitch | Duncanville | 2020–2022 | Wiz Khalifa | Amy Poehler | |
| Lucy Morgan | Hailey's On It! | 2023-2024 | Devin Bunje | Sydney Mikayla | |
| Lucy Morgan | Hailey's On It! | 2023-2024 | Nick Stanton | Sydney Mikayla | |
| Tammy Myers | The Ghost and Molly McGee | 2021-2024 | Chandler Kinney | Bill Motz | |
| Tammy Myers | The Ghost and Molly McGee | 2021-2024 | Chandler Kinney | Bob Roth | |
| Nancy | Lil Kev | 2025- | Wanda Sykes | Kevin Hart | |
| Nelly | Action Pack | 2022 | Kimberly Brooks | William Harper | |
| Nessa | Pokémon: Twilight Wings | 2020 | Anairis Quiñones | Studio Colorido | |
| Nessa | Pokémon: Twilight Wings | 2020 | Sora Amamiya | Studio Colorido | |
| Nicole | Pantheon | 2022-2023 | Anika Noni Rose | Craig Silverstein | |
| Nkati / The Lion | Eyes of Wakanda | 2025 | Cress Williams | Todd Harris | |
| Noni | Eyes of Wakanda | 2025 | Winnie Harlow | Todd Harris | |
| Noni (Older) | Eyes of Wakanda | 2025 | Lynn Whitfield | Todd Harris | |
| Chancellor Nuro | Iyanu: Child of Wonder | 2025- | Femi Sowooli | Roye Okupe | |
| Lio Oak | Kipo and the Age of Wonderbeasts | 2020 | Sterling K. Brown | Radford Sechrist | |
| King Oba Adeyinka | Iyanu: Child of Wonder | 2025- | Paul Utomi | Roye Okupe | |
| O'Bengh | What If...? | 2021-2024 | Ike Amadi | A. C. Bradley | |
| Oko | Tomb Raider: The Legend of Lara Croft | 2024-2025 | Ike Amadi | Tasha Huo | |
| Michael Olé | Jentry Chau vs. the Underworld | 2024 | AJ Beckles | Echo Wu | |
| Olodumare | Tomb Raider: The Legend of Lara Croft | 2024-2025 | Gabe Kunda | Tasha Huo | |
| Olori | Iyanu: Child of Wonder | 2025- | Adesua Etomi-Wellington | Roye Okupe | |
| Jalana Olsen | My Adventures with Superman | 2023- | Kimberly Brooks | Jake Wyatt | |
| Jalana Olsen | My Adventures with Superman | 2023- | Kimberly Brooks | Brendan Clougher | |
| Jalana Olsen | My Adventures with Superman | 2023- | Kimberly Brooks | Josie Campbell | |
| Jimmy Olsen | My Adventures with Superman | 2023- | Ishmael Sahid | Jake Wyatt | |
| Jimmy Olsen | My Adventures with Superman | 2023- | Ishmael Sahid | Brendan Clougher | |
| Jimmy Olsen | My Adventures with Superman | 2023- | Ishmael Sahid | Josie Campbell | |
| Pam | The Ghost and Molly McGee | 2021-2024 | Erica Luttrell | Bill Motz | |
| Pam | The Ghost and Molly McGee | 2021-2024 | Erica Luttrell | Bob Roth | |
| Peggy | The Addams Family 2 | 2021 | Kyla Pratt | Greg Tiernan | |
| Peggy | The Addams Family 2 | 2021 | Kyla Pratt | Conrad Vernon | |
| Pocoloco | Steel Ball Run: JoJo's Bizarre Adventure | 2026- | Kenichirou Matsuda | Hirohiko Araki | |
| Pocoloco | Steel Ball Run: JoJo's Bizarre Adventure | 2026- | Cedric L. Williams | Hirohiko Araki | |
| Poppy | Jessica's Big Little World | 2022-2023 | Olivia Bynum | Matt Burnett | |
| Poppy | Jessica's Big Little World | 2022-2023 | Olivia Bynum | Tiffany Ford | |
| Poppy | Jessica's Big Little World | 2022-2023 | Olivia Bynum | Ben Levin | |
| Jim Posey | The Mitchells vs. the Machines | 2021 | John Legend | Mike Rianda | |
| Priestess | Masters of the Universe: Revelation | 2021-2024 | Cree Summer | Kevin Smith | |
| Enrico Pucci | JoJo's Bizarre Adventure: Stone Ocean | 2021–2022 | Tomokazu Seki | Hirohiko Araki | |
| Principal O'Connor | The Ghost and Molly McGee | 2021-2024 | Eugene Byrd | Bill Motz | |
| Principal O'Connor | The Ghost and Molly McGee | 2021-2024 | Eugene Byrd | Bob Roth | |
| Okoye | What If...? | 2021-2024 | Danai Gurira | A. C. Bradley | |
| Harry Osborn | Your Friendly Neighborhood Spider-Man | 2025- | Zeno Robinson | Jeff Trammell | |
| Norman Osborn | Your Friendly Neighborhood Spider-Man | 2025- | Colman Domingo | Jeff Trammell | |
| Paul | Soul | 2020 | Daveed Diggs | Dana Murray | |
| Parnelle | High Guardian Spice | 2021 | Barbara Goodson | Raye Rodriguez | |
| Patty | The Ghost and Molly McGee | 2021-2024 | Jenifer Lewis | Bill Motz | |
| Patty | The Ghost and Molly McGee | 2021-2024 | Jenifer Lewis | Bob Roth | |
| Doctor Payne | The Proud Family: Louder and Prouder | 2022- | Kevin Michael Richardson | Bruce W. Smith | |
| Peabo | The Proud Family: Louder and Prouder | 2022- | Cree Summer | Bruce W. Smith | |
| Augustus "Gus" Porter | The Owl House | 2020-2023 | Isaac Ryan Brown | Dana Terrace | |
| Perry Porter | The Owl House | 2020-2023 | Gary Anthony Williams | Dana Terrace | |
| BeBe Proud | The Proud Family: Louder and Prouder | 2022- | Aiden Dodson | Bruce W. Smith | |
| Bobby Proud | The Proud Family: Louder and Prouder | 2022- | Cedric the Entertainer | Bruce W. Smith | |
| CeCe Proud | The Proud Family: Louder and Prouder | 2022- | Bresha Webb | Bruce W. Smith | |
| Oscar Proud | The Proud Family: Louder and Prouder | 2022- | Tommy Davidson | Bruce W. Smith | |
| Penny Proud | The Proud Family: Louder and Prouder | 2022- | Kyla Pratt | Bruce W. Smith | |
| Suga Mama Proud | The Proud Family: Louder and Prouder | 2022- | Jo Marie Payton | Bruce W. Smith | |
| Trudy Proud | The Proud Family: Louder and Prouder | 2022- | Paula Jai Parker | Bruce W. Smith | |
| Rakim | Eyes of Wakanda | 2025 | Gary Anthony Williams | Todd Harris | |
| Queen Ramonda | What If...? | 2021-2024 | Angela Bassett | A. C. Bradley | |
| Bass Reeves | Bass X Machina | 2026 | Brian Tyree Henry | LeSean Thomas | |
| Glory Reeves | Bass X Machina | 2026 | Janelle Monáe | LeSean Thomas | |
| Joslin Reyes | Tomb Raider: The Legend of Lara Croft | 2024-2025 | Mara Junot | Tasha Huo | |
| Jim "Rhodey" Rhodes | What If...? | 2021-2024 | Don Cheadle | A. C. Bradley | |
| Uncle Richard Jr. | Lil Kev | 2025- | Deon Cole | Kevin Hart | |
| Robert | Lil Kev | 2025- | Jamar Neighbors | Kevin Hart | |
| Barbara "Brooklyn Barbie" Millicent Roberts | Barbie: Big City, Big Dreams | 2021 | Amber May | Mattel | |
| Barbara "Brooklyn Barbie" Millicent Roberts | Barbie: A Touch of Magic | 2023 | Tatiana Varria | Mattel | |
| Barbara "Brooklyn Barbie" Millicent Roberts | Barbie Mysteries: The Great Horse Chase | 2024 | Diamond White | Mattel | |
| Barbara "Brooklyn Barbie" Millicent Roberts | Barbie & Teresa: Recipe for Friendship | 2025 | Tatiana Varria | Mattel | |
| Coach Roberts | Inside Out 2 | 2024 | Yvette Nicole Brown | Kelsey Mann | |
| Rochelle | Win or Lose | 2025 | Milan Ray | Carrie Hobson | |
| Rochelle | Win or Lose | 2025 | Milan Ray | Michael Yates | |
| Bylthe Rogers | Velma | 2023-2024 | Nicole Byer | Charlie Grandy | |
| Norville Rogers / Shaggy | Velma | 2023-2024 | Sam Richardson | Charlie Grandy | |
| Sam Rutherford | Star Trek: Lower Decks | 2020-2024 | Eugene Cordero | Mike McMahan | |
| Deidre Ryan | Pantheon | 2022-2023 | Nyima Funk | Craig Silverstein | |
| Sean | My Dad the Bounty Hunter | 2023-2024 | Jecobi Swain | Everett Downing | |
| Sean | My Dad the Bounty Hunter | 2023-2024 | Jecobi Swain | Patrick Harpin | |
| Sema | Super Sema | 2021 | Lupita Nyong'o | Lupita Nyong'o | |
| Mama Sewa | Iyanu: Child of Wonder | 2025- | Stella Damasus | Roye Okupe | |
| Shoola | Arcane | 2021-2024 | Mara Junot | Christian Linke | |
| Shoola | Arcane | 2021-2024 | Mara Junot | Alex Yee | |
| Shuri | What If...? | 2021-2024 | Ozioma Akagha | A. C. Bradley | |
| Side-Pony | Pantheon | 2022-2023 | Anika Noni Rose | Craig Silverstein | |
| Siggi | Hey A.J.! | 2026- | Jhene Aiko | Leo Wilson | |
| Skara | The Owl House | 2020–2023 | Kimberly Brooks | Dana Terrace | |
| Spark | Hot Wheels Let's Race | 2024-2025 | Amari McCoy | Rob David | |
| Spark | Hot Wheels Let's Race | 2024-2025 | Jordan Gershowitz | | |
| Spark | Hot Wheels Let's Race | 2024-2025 | Melanie Shannon | | |
| Star | Young Love | 2023 | Tamar Braxton | Matthew A. Cherry | |
| Steel / John Henry Irons | My Adventures with Superman | 2023- | Byron Marc Newsome | Jake Wyatt | |
| Steel / John Henry Irons | My Adventures with Superman | 2023- | Byron Marc Newsome | Brendan Clougher | |
| Steel / John Henry Irons | My Adventures with Superman | 2023- | Byron Marc Newsome | Josie Campbell | |
| John Stewart / Green Lantern | Green Lantern: Beware My Power | 2022 | Aldis Hodge | Jeff Wamester | |
| Penelope Stone | Tomb Raider: The Legend of Lara Croft | 2024-2025 | Toks Olagundoye | Tasha Huo | |
| Silas Stone | My Adventures with Superman | 2023- | Byron Marc Newsome | Jake Wyatt | |
| Silas Stone | My Adventures with Superman | 2023- | Byron Marc Newsome | Brendan Clougher | |
| Silas Stone | My Adventures with Superman | 2023- | Byron Marc Newsome | Josie Campbell | |
| Victor Stone / Cyborg | Justice League x RWBY: Super Heroes & Huntsmen | 2023 | Tru Valentino | Kerry Shawcross | |
| Victor Stone / Cyborg | Justice League x RWBY: Super Heroes & Huntsmen | 2023 | Tru Valentino | Dustin Matthews | |
| Victor Stone / Cyborg | Justice League x RWBY: Super Heroes & Huntsmen | 2023 | Tru Valentino | Yssa Badiola | |
| Sunny | Oh My God... Yes! | 2025 | Adele "Supreme" Williams | Adele "Supreme" Williams | |
| T'Chaka | What If...? | 2021-2024 | John Kani | A. C. Bradley | |
| Tafari | Eyes of Wakanda | 2025 | Zeke Alton | Todd Harris | |
| Taiwo | Tomb Raider: The Legend of Lara Croft | 2024-2025 | Toks Olagundoye | Tasha Huo | |
| Sovereign Uriel Tal'Dorei | The Legend of Vox Machina | 2022- | Khary Payton | Chris Prynoski | |
| Teela / Sorceress | He-Man and the Masters of the Universe | 2021-2022 | Kimberly Brooks | Rob David | |
| Teela Na / Eldress | He-Man and the Masters of the Universe | 2021-2022 | Kimberly Brooks | Rob David | |
| Teeny | Goldie | 2025- | Amari McCoy | Emily Brundige | |
| Mister Terrific | Injustice | 2021 | Matt Peters | Edwin Hodge | |
| Mister Terrific | Justice League: Crisis on Infinite Earths - Part One | 2024 | Jeff Wamester | Ato Essandoh | . |
| Mister Terrific | Justice League: Crisis on Infinite Earths - Part Two | 2024 | Jeff Wamester | Ato Essandoh | . |
| Mister Terrific | Justice League: Crisis on Infinite Earths - Part Three | 2024 | Jeff Wamester | Ato Essandoh | . |
| Tess | My Dad the Bounty Hunter | 2023-2024 | Yvonne Orji | Everett Downing | |
| Tess | My Dad the Bounty Hunter | 2023-2024 | Yvonne Orji | Patrick Harpin | |
| Thyme | High Guardian Spice | 2021 | Michelle Deco | Raye Rodriguez | |
| Tiki | Lil Kev | 2025- | Ms. Pat | Kevin Hart | |
| Cole Tillerman | Central Park | 2020-2022 | Tituss Burgess | Josh Gad | |
| Cole Tillerman | Central Park | 2020-2022 | Tituss Burgess | Loren Bouchard | |
| Cole Tillerman | Central Park | 2020-2022 | Tituss Burgess | Nora Smith | |
| Molly Tillerman | Central Park | 2020-2022 | Kristen Bell | Nora Smith | |
| Molly Tillerman | Central Park | 2020-2022 | Emmy Raver-Lampman | Nora Smith | |
| Owen Tillerman | Central Park | 2020-2022 | Emmy Raver-Lampman | Nora Smith | |
| Toye | Iyanu: Child of Wonder | 2025- | Samuel Kugbiyi | Roye Okupe | |
| King Triton | Ariel | 2024- | Taye Diggs | Wild Canary Animation | |
| King Triton | Ariel | 2024- | Taye Diggs | Jeremiah Felder | |
| Ron Troupe | Superman: Man of Tomorrow | 2020 | Eugene Byrd | Jim Krieg | |
| Ron Troupe | Superman: Man of Tomorrow | 2020 | Eugene Byrd | Kimberly S. Moreau | |
| Ronnie Troup | My Adventures with Superman | 2023- | Kenna Ramsey | Jake Wyatt | |
| Ronnie Troup | My Adventures with Superman | 2023- | Kenna Ramsey | Brendan Clougher | |
| Ronnie Troup | My Adventures with Superman | 2023- | Kenna Ramsey | Josie Campbell | |
| Tulip | Oh My God... Yes! | 2025 | DomiNque Perry | Adele "Supreme" Williams | |
| Ursula | Ariel | 2024- | Amber Riley | Wild Canary Animation | |
| Uwa | Iyanu: Child of Wonder | 2025- | Femi "Bakes" Olugbade | Roye Okupe | |
| Queen Valerin | Nimona | 2023 | Lorraine Toussaint | Nick Bruno | |
| Queen Valerin | Nimona | 2023 | Lorraine Toussaint | Troy Quane | |
| Valkyrie | What If...? | 2021-2024 | Tessa Thompson | A. C. Bradley | |
| Valkyrie | Marvel Zombies | 2025 | Tessa Thompson | Zeb Wells | |
| Amanda Waller | My Adventures with Superman | 2023- | Debra Wilson | Jake Wyatt | |
| Amanda Waller | My Adventures with Superman | 2023- | Debra Wilson | Brendan Clougher | |
| Amanda Waller | My Adventures with Superman | 2023- | Debra Wilson | Josie Campbell | |
| Amanda Waller | Suicide Squad Isekai | 2024 | Jasmine Renee Thomas | Eri Osada | |
| Amanda Waller | Suicide Squad Isekai | 2024 | Kujira | Eri Osada | |
| Amanda Waller | Creature Commandos | 2024- | Viola Davis | James Gunn | |
| Weather Report | JoJo's Bizarre Adventure: Stone Ocean | 2021-2022 | Stephen Fu | Hirohiko Araki | |
| Weather Report | JoJo's Bizarre Adventure: Stone Ocean | 2021-2022 | Yuichiro Umehara | Hirohiko Araki | |
| A.J. Whether | Hey A.J.! | 2026- | Amari McCoy | Leo Wilson | |
| Mr. White | Johnny Test | 2021-2022 | Deven Mack | Scott Fellows | |
| Perry White | My Adventures with Superman | 2023- | Darrell Brown | Jake Wyatt | |
| Perry White | My Adventures with Superman | 2023- | Darrell Brown | Brendan Clougher | |
| Perry White | My Adventures with Superman | 2023- | Darrell Brown | Josie Campbell | |
| Bernard Williams | Jessica's Big Little World | 2022-2023 | Phil LaMarr | Matt Burnett | |
| Bernard Williams | Jessica's Big Little World | 2022-2023 | Phil LaMarr | Tiffany Ford | |
| Bernard Williams | Jessica's Big Little World | 2022-2023 | Phil LaMarr | Ben Levin | |
| Bernard Williams | Craig Before the Creek | 2023 | Phil LaMarr | Ben Levin | |
| Craig Williams | Jessica's Big Little World | 2022-2023 | Philip Solomon | Matt Burnett | |
| Craig Williams | Jessica's Big Little World | 2022-2023 | Philip Solomon | Tiffany Ford | |
| Craig Williams | Jessica's Big Little World | 2022-2023 | Philip Solomon | Ben Levin | |
| Craig Williams | Craig Before the Creek | 2023 | Philip Solomon | Ben Levin | |
| Dorothea Williams | Soul | 2020 | Angela Bassett | Dana Murray | |
| Duane Williams | Jessica's Big Little World | 2022-2023 | Byron Marc Newsome | Matt Burnett | |
| Duane Williams | Jessica's Big Little World | 2022-2023 | Byron Marc Newsome | Tiffany Ford | |
| Duane Williams | Jessica's Big Little World | 2022-2023 | Byron Marc Newsome | Ben Levin | |
| Duane Williams | Craig Before the Creek | 2023 | Byron Marc Newsome | Ben Levin | |
| Jessica Williams | Jessica's Big Little World | 2022-2023 | Lucia Cunningham | Matt Burnett | |
| Jessica Williams | Jessica's Big Little World | 2022-2023 | Lucia Cunningham | Tiffany Ford | |
| Jessica Williams | Jessica's Big Little World | 2022-2023 | Lucia Cunningham | Ben Levin | |
| Jessica Williams | Craig Before the Creek | 2023 | Lucia Cunningham | Ben Levin | |
| Mitch Williams | Glitch Techs | 2020 | Luke Youngblood | Kevin Smith | |
| Mr. Williams | Hailey's On It! | 2023-2024 | Devin Bunje | Gary Anthony Williams | |
| Mr. Williams | Hailey's On It! | 2023-2024 | Nick Stanton | Gary Anthony Williams | |
| Nicole Williams | Jessica's Big Little World | 2022-2023 | Kimberly Hebert Gregory | Matt Burnett | |
| Nicole Williams | Jessica's Big Little World | 2022-2023 | Kimberly Hebert Gregory | Tiffany Ford | |
| Nicole Williams | Jessica's Big Little World | 2022-2023 | Kimberly Hebert Gregory | Ben Levin | |
| Nicole Williams | Craig Before the Creek | 2023 | Kimberly Hebert Gregory | Ben Levin | |
| Kendra Wilson | Paw Patrol: The Movie | 2021 | Yara Shahidi | Cal Brunker | |
| Wolf | Kipo and the Age of Wonderbeasts | 2020 | Sydney Mikayla | Radford Sechrist | |
| Yangzi | Duncanville | 2020-2022 | Yassir Lester | Mike Scully | |
| Yangzi | Duncanville | 2020-2022 | Yassir Lester | Julie Thacker Scully | |
| Yangzi | Duncanville | 2020-2022 | Yassir Lester | Amy Poehler | |
| Yemeja | Tomb Raider: The Legend of Lara Croft | 2024-2025 | Yetide Badaki | Tasha Huo | |
| Angela Young | Young Love | 2023 | Issa Rae | Matthew A. Cherry | |
| Gigi Young | Young Love | 2023 | Loretta Devine | Matthew A. Cherry | |
| Russell Young | Young Love | 2023 | Harry Lennix | Matthew A. Cherry | |
| Sky Young | Arcane | 2021-2024 | Kimberly Brooks | Christian Linke | |
| Sky Young | Arcane | 2021-2024 | Kimberly Brooks | Alex Yee | |
| Zip | Tomb Raider: The Legend of Lara Croft | 2024-2025 | Allen Maldonado | Tasha Huo | |
| Zira | Pretty Pretty Please I Don't Want to Be a Magical Girl | 2025-present | Bennett Abara | Kiana Khansmith | |

== See also ==
- List of black animated characters: 1990s
- List of black animated characters: 2000s
- List of black animated characters: 2010s
- African characters in comics
- Ethnic stereotypes in comics
- List of black superheroes
- List of black video game characters
