= List of black animated characters: 1990s =

This list of black animated characters lists fictional characters found on animated television series and in motion pictures, from 1990 to 1999. The Black people in this list include African American animated characters and other characters of Sub-Saharan African descent or populations characterized by dark skin color (a definition that also includes certain populations in Oceania, the southern West Asia, and the Siddi of southern South Asia).

The names are organized alphabetically by surname (i.e. last name), or by single name if the character does not have a surname.

== List ==
Character	Title	Duration	Voice actor	Creator	Ref.
Action Hank	Dexter's Laboratory	1996-2003	Greg Eagles	Genndy Tartakovsky	
Action Hank	Dexter's Laboratory	1996-2003	John Garry	Genndy Tartakovsky	
Action Hank	Dexter's Laboratory	1996-2003	Michael Armstrong	Genndy Tartakovsky	
Action Hank	Dexter's Laboratory	1996-2003	Kevin Michael Richardson	Genndy Tartakovsky	
Big Chill	C Bear and Jamal	1996-1997	Aries Spears	Earl Richey Jones	
Big Chill	C Bear and Jamal	1996-1997	Aries Spears	Todd R. Jones	
Lucas Bishop	X-Men	1992-1997	Philip Akin	Eric Lewald	
Lucas Bishop	X-Men	1992-1997	Philip Akin	Sidney Iwanter	
Lucas Bishop	X-Men	1992-1997	Philip Akin	Mark Edens	
Tolkien Black	South Park	1997-	Adrien Beard	Trey Parker	
Tolkien Black	South Park	1997-	Adrien Beard	Matt Stone	
Dana Blessing	Batman: The Animated Series	1992-1995	Vernee Watson Johnson	Eric Radomski	
Dana Blessing	Batman: The Animated Series	1992-1995	Vernee Watson Johnson	Bruce Timm	
Brock	Pokémon	1997-	Eric Stuart	The Pokémon Company	
Brock	Pokémon	1997-	Bill Rogers	The Pokémon Company	
Cleveland Brown	Family Guy	1999-	Mike Henry	Seth MacFarlane	
Cleveland Brown	Family Guy	1999-	Arif Zahir	Seth MacFarlane	
Cleveland Brown Jr.	Family Guy	1999-	Mike Henry	Seth MacFarlane	
Loretta Brown	Family Guy	1999-	Alex Borstein	Seth MacFarlane	
Calliope	Hercules	1997	Lillias White	Ron Clements	
Calliope	Hercules	1997	Lillias White	Alice Dewey	
Calliope	Hercules	1997	Lillias White	John Musker	
Canary	Hunter x Hunter	1999-2001	Reiko Kiuchi	Yoshihiro Togashi	
Canary	Hunter x Hunter	1999-2001	Rocio Barahona	Yoshihiro Togashi	
Capital G	Dexter's Laboratory	1996-2003	Tom Kenny	Genndy Tartakovsky	
Capital G	Dexter's Laboratory	1996-2003	Greg Eagles	Genndy Tartakovsky	
Susanna "Susie" Carmichael	Rugrats	1991-2004	Cree Summer	Arlene Klasky	
Susanna "Susie" Carmichael	Rugrats	1991-2004	Cree Summer	Gábor Csupó	
Susanna "Susie" Carmichael	Rugrats	1991-2004	Cree Summer	Paul Germain	
Carter	Midnight Patrol: Adventures in the Dream Zone	1990	George Lemore	Martin Powell	
Carter	Midnight Patrol: Adventures in the Dream Zone	1990	George Lemore	Vivien Schrager-Powell	
Casca	Berserk	1997-1998	Yūko Miyamura	Kentaro Miura	
Casca	Berserk	1997-1998	Carrie Keranen	Kentaro Miura	
Chef (Jerome McElroy)	South Park	1997-	Isaac Hayes	Trey Parker	
Chef (Jerome McElroy)	South Park	1997-	Isaac Hayes	Matt Stone	
Clementine	Caillou	1997-2010	Brigid Tierney	Hélène Desputeaux	
Clementine	Caillou	1997-2010	Brigid Tierney	Christine L'Heureux	
Clio	Hercules	1997	Vaneese Y. Thomas	Ron Clements	
Clio	Hercules	1997	Vaneese Y. Thomas	Alice Dewey	
Clio	Hercules	1997	Vaneese Y. Thomas	John Musker	
Coffee	Cowboy Bebop	1998-1999	Atsuko Tanaka	Shinichirō Watanabe	
Dwight Conrad	Futurama	1999-2003 (Note: Also aired 2008-2013, 2023-)	Bumper Robinson	Matt Groening	
Hermes Conrad	Futurama	1999-2003	Phil LaMarr	Matt Groening	
LaBarbara Conrad	Futurama	1999-2003	Dawnn Lewis	Matt Groening	
Earl Cooper	Batman: The Animated Series	1992-1995	Paul Winfield	Eric Radomski	
Earl Cooper	Batman: The Animated Series	1992-1995	Paul Winfield	Bruce Timm	
Nichole Daniels	South Park	1997-	Laylo Incognegro	Trey Parker	
Nichole Daniels	South Park	1997-	Laylo Incognegro	Matt Stone	
Danitra	Superman: The Animated Series	1996-2000	Miracle Vincent	Bruce Timm	
Danitra	Superman: The Animated Series	1996-2000	Miracle Vincent	Alan Burnett	
Delilah	Gargoyles	1994-1997	Salli Richardson	Greg Weisman	
Sweet "Clyde" Dixon	Futurama	1999-2003 (Note: Also aired 2008-2013, 2023-)	David Herman	Matt Groening	
DJ Tech	Station Zero	1999	Scratch	Tramp Daly	
Fallon	Princess Gwenevere and the Jewel Riders	1995-1996	Deborah Allison	Robert Mandell	
Falcon (Sam Wilson)	The Avengers: United They Stand	1999-2000	Martin Roach	Stan Lee	
Bobby Felix	Superman: The Animated Series	1996-2000	Hassan Nicholas	Bruce Timm	
Bobby Felix	Superman: The Animated Series	1996-2000	Hassan Nicholas	Alan Burnett	
Professor Felix	Superman: The Animated Series	1996-2000	Ernie Hudson	Bruce Timm	
Professor Felix	Superman: The Animated Series	1996-2000	Ernie Hudson	Alan Burnett	
Keesha Franklin	The Magic School Bus	1994-1997	Erica Luttrell	Alison Blank	
Keesha Franklin	The Magic School Bus	1994-1997	Erica Luttrell	Kristin Laskas Martin	
Keesha Franklin	The Magic School Bus	1994-1997	Erica Luttrell	Jane Startz	
Lucius Fox	Batman: The Animated Series	1992-1995	Brock Peters	Eric Radomski	
Lucius Fox	Batman: The Animated Series	1992-1995	Brock Peters	Bruce Timm	
Lucius Fox	The New Batman Adventures	1997-1999	Mel Winkler	Bruce Timm	
Lucius Fox	The New Batman Adventures	1997-1999	Mel Winkler	Paul Dini	
Lucius Fox	The New Batman Adventures	1997-1999	Mel Winkler	Alan Burnett	
Hammerman	Hammerman	1991-1992	MC Hammer	MC Hammer	
Hanes	Superman: The Animated Series	1996-2000	John Garry	Bruce Timm	
Hanes	Superman: The Animated Series	1996-2000	John Garry	Alan Burnett	
Commissioner Henderson	Superman: The Animated Series	1996-2000	Mel Winkler	Bruce Timm	
Commissioner Henderson	Superman: The Animated Series	1996-2000	Mel Winkler	Alan Burnett	
Russel Hobbs	Gorillaz	1998-	Remi Kabaka Jr.	Damon Albarn	
Russel Hobbs	Gorillaz	1998-	Remi Kabaka Jr.	Jamie Hewlett	
Natasha Irons	Superman: The Animated Series	1996-2000	Cree Summer	Bruce Timm	
Natasha Irons	Superman: The Animated Series	1996-2000	Cree Summer	Alan Burnett	
Jett Jackson	The Famous Jett Jackson	1998-2001	Lee Thompson Young	Fracaswell Hyman	
Jerome	Family Guy	1999-	Kevin Michael Richardson	Seth MacFarlane	
Gerald Johanssen	Hey Arnold!	1996-2004	Jamil Walker Smith	Craig Bartlett	
Karaz	Station Zero	1999	Riggs Morales	Tramp Daly	
Kirikou	Kirikou and the Sorceress	1998	Doudou Gueye Thiaw	Michel Ocelot	
Kwame	Captain Planet and the Planeteers	1990-1996	LeVar Burton	Ted Turner	
Kwame	Captain Planet and the Planeteers	1990-1996	LeVar Burton	Barbara Pyle	
Kwame	Captain Planet and the Planeteers	1990-1996	LeVar Burton	Robert Larkin III	
Kwame	C Bear and Jamal	1996-1997	Aries Spears	Earl Richey Jones	
Kwame	C Bear and Jamal	1996-1997	Aries Spears	Todd R. Jones	
Jodie Landon	Daria	1997-2002	Jessica Cydnee Jackson	Glenn Eichler	
Jodie Landon	Daria	1997-2002	Jessica Cydnee Jackson	Susie Lewis Lynn	
Little Bill	Little Bill	1999-2004	Xavier Pritchett	Bill Cosby	
Luna	Scooby-Doo! and the Witch's Ghost	1999	Kimberly Brooks	Jim Stenstrum	
Makai	The Wild Thornberrys	1998-2004	Steve Harris	Arlene Klasky	
Makai	The Wild Thornberrys	1998-2004	Courtney B. Vance	Gábor Csupó	
Makai	The Wild Thornberrys	1998-2004	Courtney B. Vance	Steve Pepoon	
Makai	The Wild Thornberrys	1998-2004	Courtney B. Vance	David Silverman	
Makai	The Wild Thornberrys	1998-2004	Courtney B. Vance	Stephen Sustarsic	
Marva	Batman: The Animated Series	1992-1995	Candy Ann Brown	Eric Radomski	
Marva	Batman: The Animated Series	1992-1995	Candy Ann Brown	Bruce Timm	
Marvin	Waynehead	1996-1997	Tico Wells	Damon Wayans	
Diane Marza	Gargoyles	1994-1997	Nichelle Nichols	Greg Weisman	
Maya	C Bear and Jamal	1996-1997	Kim Fields	Earl Richey Jones	
Maya	C Bear and Jamal	1996-1997	Kim Fields	Todd R. Jones	
Elisa Maza	Gargoyles	1994-1997	Salli Richardson	Greg Weisman	
MC Jackie Potato	AKA Cult Toons	1999-2000	Unknown	Cartoon Network	
Mee Mee	Dexter's Laboratory	1996-2003	Kimberly Brooks	Genndy Tartakovsky	
Melpomene	Hercules	1997	Cheryl Freeman	Ron Clements	
Melpomene	Hercules	1997	Cheryl Freeman	Alice Dewey	
Melpomene	Hercules	1997	Cheryl Freeman	John Musker	
Micron	Batman Beyond	1999-2001	Wayne Brady	Bruce Timm	
Micron	Batman Beyond	1999-2001	Wayne Brady	Paul Dini	
Micron	Batman Beyond	1999-2001	Wayne Brady	Alan Burnett	
Miles	Cowboy Bebop	1998-1999	Yoku Shioya	Shinichirō Watanabe	
Mo' Money	Waynehead	1996-1997	Jamil Walker Smith	Damon Wayans	
Officer Black	Dragon Ball: The Path to Power	1996	Christopher Sabat	Akira Toriyama	
Kiddy Phenil	Silent Möbius	1998	Hiromi Tsuru	Kia Asamiya	
Prowler (Hobie Brown)	Spider-Man	1994-1998	Tim Russ	Marvel Films Animation	
Psycho P	One Piece	1999-	Hiroyuki Yoshino	Eiichiro Oda	
Dan Riley	Batman: The Animated Series	1992-1995	Dorian Harewood	Eric Radomski	
Dan Riley	Batman: The Animated Series	1992-1995	Dorian Harewood	Bruce Timm	
Robbie Robertson	Spider-Man	1994-1998	Rodney Saulsberry	Marvel Films Animation	
Roz	Waynehead	1996-1997	T'Keyah Crystal Keymáh	Damon Wayans	
Scooter	Station Zero	1999	Quan Zilla	Tramp Daly	
Shaft	Cowboy Bebop	1998-1999	Hōchū Ōtsuka	Shinichirō Watanabe	
Barbados Slim	Futurama	1999-2003 (Note: Also aired 2008-2013, 2023-)	John DiMaggio	Matt Groening	
Hayden Sloane	Batman: The Animated Series	1992-1995	LeVar Burton	Eric Radomski	
Hayden Sloane	Batman: The Animated Series	1992-1995	LeVar Burton	Bruce Timm	
Steel (John Henry Irons)	Superman: The Animated Series	1996-2000	Michael Dorn	Bruce Timm	
Steel (John Henry Irons)	Superman: The Animated Series	1996-2000	Michael Dorn	Alan Burnett	
Storm	Spider-Man	1994-1998	Iona Morris	Marvel Films Animation	
Storm	Spider-Man	1994-1998	Alison Sealy-Smith	Marvel Films Animation	
Storm	X-Men: The Animated Series	1992-1997	Alison Sealy-Smith	Philip Akin	
Storm	X-Men: The Animated Series	1992-1997	Alison Sealy-Smith	Sidney Iwanter	
Storm	X-Men: The Animated Series	1992-1997	Alison Sealy-Smith	Mark Edens	
Talon (Derek Maza)	Gargoyles	1994-1997	Rocky Carroll	Greg Weisman	
Ethan "Bubblegum" Tate	Futurama	1999-2003 (Note: Also aired 2008-2013, 2023-)	Phil LaMarr	Matt Groening	
Terpsichore	Hercules	1997	LaChanze	Ron Clements	
Terpsichore	Hercules	1997	LaChanze	Alice Dewey	
Terpsichore	Hercules	1997	LaChanze	John Musker	
Thalia	Hercules	1997	Roz Ryan	John Musker	
Toof	Waynehead	1996-1997	Shawn Wayans	Damon Wayans	
Ron Troupe	Superman: The Animated Series	1996-2000	Dorian Harewood	Bruce Timm	
Ron Troupe	Superman: The Animated Series	1996-2000	Dorian Harewood	Alan Burnett	
Mosquito "Skeeter" Valentine	Doug	1991-1994	Fred Newman	Jim Jinkins	
Mosquito "Skeeter" Valentine	Doug	1996-1999	Fred Newman	Jim Jinkins	
Vampire Queen (Miriam)	Spider-Man	1994-1998	Nichelle Nichols	Marvel Films Animation	
Domino Walker	Cowboy Bebop	1998-1999	Tessho Genda	Shinichirō Watanabe	
Ernest Walker	Superman: The Animated Series	1996-2000	Paul Colbert	Bruce Timm	
Ernest Walker	Superman: The Animated Series	1996-2000	Paul Colbert	Alan Burnett	
Warhawk (Rex Stewart)	Batman Beyond	1999-2001	Peter Onorati	Bruce Timm	
Warhawk (Rex Stewart)	Batman Beyond	1999-2001	Peter Onorati	Paul Dini	
Warhawk (Rex Stewart)	Batman Beyond	1999-2001	Peter Onorati	Alan Burnett	
Damey "Waynehead" Wayne	Waynehead	1996-1997	Orlando Brown	Damon Wayans	
Ollie Williams	Family Guy	1999-	Phil LaMarr	Seth MacFarlane	
Grandma Bernice Wingo	C Bear and Jamal	1996-1997	Dawnn Lewis	Earl Richey Jones	
Jamal Harrison Wingo	C Bear and Jamal	1996-1997	Arthur Reggie III	Todd R. Jones	
Hawthorne Wingo	C Bear and Jamal	1996-1997	George Wallace	Todd R. Jones	
Vincent "Vince" Pierre LaSalle	Recess	1997-2001	Rickey D'Shon Collins	Paul Germain	
Vincent "Vince" Pierre LaSalle	Recess	1997-2001	Rickey D'Shon Collins	Joe Ansolabehere	

== See also ==
- List of black animated characters: 2000s
- List of black animated characters: 2010s
- List of black animated characters: 2020s
- African characters in comics
- Ethnic stereotypes in comics
- List of black superheroes
- List of black video game characters
