= Nessa (Pokémon) =

Pokémon gym leader

- Pokémon character
- Nessa from Pokémon Sword and Shield
- First appearance: Pokémon Sword and Shield (2019)
- Designed by: Take Oekaki
- Voiced by: English: Anairis Quinones (Pokémon: Twilight Wings) Tiana Camacho (Pokémon Masters); Japanese: Sora Amamiya

Nessa, known in Japan as Rurina (Japanese: ルリナ), is a fictional character in Nintendo and Game Freak's Pokémon franchise. Designed by illustrator Take Oekaki and introduced in the 2019 video games Pokémon Sword and Shield, she is a model that also acts as a Gym Leader, specializing in Water-type Pokémon. Since her initial appearance she has appeared in additional media related to the franchise, including Pokémon Masters EX and anime Pokémon: Twilight Wings. In Japanese she is voiced by Sora Amamiya, while in English she has been voiced by Anairis Quinones and Tiana Camacho.

Debuting at E3 2019's Nintendo Direct, she was immediately popular, with several pieces of fan art and cosplay appearing on social media outlets, and various publications offering their own praise. A significant amount of praise came from her representation of diversity within the series as a woman with dark-skin amongst a predominantly white cast, with some seeing her as an example of a strong black character in video games. Controversy arose however after artists were criticized on social media for how they depicted her skin color, with some claiming it to be whitewashing, which further escalated when internet trolls created racist depictions or mods in response. This led online publications to examine the backlash, while discussing the importance of skin color in character portrayal.

== Conception and design ==
Nessa's concept art emphasized her flexibility and athleticism.

Developed by Game Freak and published by Nintendo, the Pokémon franchise began in Japan in 1996 with the release of the video games Pokémon Red and Blue for the Game Boy. In these games, the player assumes the role of a Pokémon Trainer whose goal is to capture and train creatures called Pokémon. Players use the creatures' special abilities to combat other Pokémon, both in the wild as well as those used by other Trainers. Created for the 2019 sequels Pokémon Sword and Shield, Nessa is a "Gym Leader", a type of Trainer that acts as a boss players must defeat to proceed.

Designed by illustrator Take Oekaki, Nessa is a dark skinned woman with long black hair that has blue streaks in it, and a spherical pin in the back. Her outfit consists of a wetsuit top, feminine hot pants, and sandals with small life preservers on the sides. She wears black eyeliner with blue eye shadow and a variety of jewelry, including hoop earrings, arm bracelets, and a glass choker around her neck. Nessa's uniform number is "049", which can be read in Japanese goroawase for oyogu (泳ぐ; lit. "to swim"). While Nessa's name is a reference to Scotland's Loch Ness lake, her Japanese name Rurina is a combination of "ruri", the Japanese name for blue gemstone lapis lazuli, and "marina".

== Appearances ==
As introduced in Pokémon Sword and Shield, Nessa is a model, and acts as the game's second Gym Leader. Specializing in Water-type Pokémon, she notably utilizes a Drednaw amongst her lineup. She also appears in the mobile game Pokémon Masters EX paired with Drednaw, as well as on several cards for the Pokémon Trading Card Game. While she was unvoiced in the original game, for Pokémon Masters EX she is voiced by Sora Amamiya in Japanese, and Tiana Camacho in English.

Outside of games, Nessa has appeared in the fourth episode of original net animation anime series Pokémon: Twilight Wings. In it, Nessa is faced with a choice whether or not to pursue her modelling career full time, at the cost of giving up on Pokémon training. While reminiscing about a Feebas Pokémon she met in the past, a group of Water-type Pokémon approach the ship she's currently doing a photo shoot on. She dives in the water to see them, and sees a Milotic, recognizing it evolved from the Feebas she knew. Reinvigorated, she decides to continue pursuing both careers. While Amamiya reprised her role in Japan for Twilight Wings, in English she was voiced by Anairis Quiñones.

In literature, she appears in serial manga Pokémon Adventures's adaptation of Sword and Shield.

== Promotion and reception ==
Nessa was first unveiled at the Nintendo Direct for E3 2019, highlighted in footage showcasing Pokémon Sword and Shield. She was later featured in a playable demo, acting as its final boss and showcasing the title's new features. Several pieces of merchandise have also been released, including a plush toy and a statue, the latter of which was released as part of Bandai's "Bandai Spirits" toyline and featured a separate Drednaw statue alongside her. In 2020, a Nessa-themed boxed set was released for the Pokémon Trading Card Game, featuring the character's image on the included card holder and sleeve protectors.

Since her debut, the character has been met with positive reception. She quickly became the subject of numerous pieces of fan art on social media websites, and was featured in several examples of cosplay such as that by professional wrestler Zelina Vega. Ana Diaz of Polygon praised how well her design elements worked together, calling it "fire", while also stressing how important she felt it was for the game to showcase a dark-skinned character amongst a predominantly white cast. Echoing the last sentiment, Junkee writer Amanda Yeo also praised the character's sense of style, and described her as "beautiful, self-assured and powerful enough to kick the arses of you and your entire extended family", feeling both elements contributed to her popularity with fans. Kotaku's Gita Jackson meanwhile cited how her athletic attire helped emphasize the game's themes of the series maturing, illustrating Pokémon battling as a competitive sport. While her appearance in Twilight Wings also received praise, Tom Steel of Comic Book Resources expressed disappointment in Nessa's absence from the Pokémon anime.

Despite not being stated as such by Game Freak, several media outlets have examined Nessa as an example of a black character in video games. Eurogamer's Calypso Mellor described Nintendo's highlighting of her in the Sword and Shield demo at E3 was "fantastic", and felt it was a positive step in diversity for the series. Junae Benne of Game Industry News described her as "gentle, tough, competitive, and a good sport", and cited her as an example of black representation she wanted to see more of in gaming. Princess Weekes of The Mary Sue stated she was excited by the diversity Nessa brought to the game's world, emphasizing what it meant to her in terms of representation while citing fan excitement on social media at seeing such a character.

In 2019, a controversy arose where fan artists received backlash and accusations of whitewashing for depicting her with a lighter skin tone. While some arguments claimed Nessa was actually tan, others countered with discussions of how to properly illustrate darker skin colors, which many fans saw instead as attempts at "policing" art. Others tried to argue it instead as an example of "racebending". Internet trolls escalated matters further, depicting her as a racial stereotype of a monkey in artwork, or changing her to be white in a mod for Sword and Shield, using the argument that she was actually just "very tan".

Several media outlets examined the event, with Kiara Halls of Comic Book Resources arguing that cultural depictions of tan and black characters may differ between countries, but also the lack of representation in gaming may play a role in how such characters are perceived. Meanwhile, The Mary Sue's Weekes felt that historically negative perceptions regarding race may play a factor in how some visualized or depicted characters like Nessa, and felt that even if unintentional, the lightening of Nessa's skin color sends a message that "darker women aren’t as beautiful". Anthony Gramuglia in an article for Comic Book Resources questioned what enjoyment could be gained from such mods that remove a character's racial identity, feeling it existed solely to attack perceived "social justice warriors" and was "evidence of an unwillingness to accept people exist outside of a bubble you craft for yourself and choose [...] where you won't encounter people different from yourself."
