= List of Static Shock characters =

This is a list of characters appearing in the TV series Static Shock.

== Main characters ==
=== Virgil Hawkins ===
Virgil Ovid Hawkins, also known as Static (voiced by Phil LaMarr), is an African-American high school student from Dakota City who, as a result of being accidentally exposed to an experimental mutagen in an event called the "Big Bang", gained the ability to control and manipulate electromagnetism. After discovering others like himself, nicknamed "Bang Babies", using their powers for criminal pursuits, Virgil becomes a hero to stop them. Virgil is an intelligent young man with a strong sense of justice, but grapples with self-doubt. Over the course of the series, he gradually becomes more mature and responsible with his powers.

=== Richie Foley ===
Richard "Richie" Osgood Foley (voiced by Jason Marsden) is Virgil Hawkins' best friend who supports the latter as Static by developing gadgets for him during the first and second seasons. In the latter season episode "Power Play", Richie encounters Ragtag, who grants him the power to repel or deflect objects via purple energy. Taking the name "Push", he becomes addicted and begins stealing for Ragtag in exchange for him maintaining his powers, but eventually sees the error of his ways and helps Virgil defeat Ragtag. In the third season, due to prolonged exposure to Virgil, Richie becomes a Bang Baby with superhuman intelligence and low-level technopathy. Using his newfound powers, he builds advanced technology, such as the robot "Back-Pack", and joins Virgil in fighting crime as the superhero Gear.

According to the series' creators, Richie is based on Rick Stone, Virgil's best friend in the comics, who is gay. Since his sexual orientation could not be explored within the context of a children's television series at the time of the show's original run, it was never addressed if Richie was gay as well, though series creator Dwayne McDuffie did consider him gay and subtly hinted at such throughout the series. Elements of Richie, including his Gear identity, were incorporated into Rick beginning in 2023 with the Milestone 30th Anniversary Special.

=== Robert Hawkins ===
Robert Hawkins (voiced by Kevin Michael Richardson) is the widowed father of Virgil and Sharon. A strict yet caring social worker and head counselor of the Freeman Community Center who served in the Marines, he strongly dislikes gangs and the destructive attitudes of most Bang Babies, which motivates him to counteract bad influences on young people. Throughout most of the series, he is unaware of his son's actions as Static until he is kidnapped by Puff and Onyx on Omnara's behalf and deduces his secret identity near the end of the series, though he agrees to keep it secret.

=== Sharon Hawkins ===
Sharon Hawkins (voiced by Michele Morgan) is Virgil's strong-willed and caring older sister who attends college, but still lives at home, and remains unaware of her brother's activities as Static throughout the series. Additionally, she volunteers at a hospital and works as counselor at the Freeman Community Center. Despite frequently arguing with Virgil, she still cares for him.

== Recurring characters ==
=== Edwin Alva ===
Edwin Alva Sr. (voiced by Kerrigan Mahan) is a businessman and head of Alva Industries who neglects and holds contempt for his son, Edwin Alva Jr., which would lead to the latter becoming a supervillain and being turned to stone while seeking his attention. In response, a guilt-ridden Alva Sr. focuses his efforts on saving his son, which he eventually succeeds in with Static, Gear, and Hot-Streak's help.

Series creator Dwayne McDuffie has said that Alva Sr. was supposed to have been "more Peter O'Toole than Peter Fonda".

=== Frieda Goren ===
Frieda Goren (voiced by Danica McKellar) is a friend of Virgil's and his initial crush. Though lively and popular at Dakota Union High School, being an active participant and the driving force behind the school's newspaper, she tends to be short-tempered and impulsive, earning her the nickname "Hurricane Frieda".

=== Francis Stone ===
Hot-Streak as he appears in Static Shock

Francis "F-Stop" Stone (voiced by Danny Cooksey) is a hot-headed and wisecracking bully at Dakota Union High School and the leader of one of the gangs that took part in the gang war against Wade's gang that would later erupt into the "Big Bang", during which he acquired pyrokinetic powers. Taking the name "Hot-Streak", he serves as Static's first rival and maintains this rivalry with him throughout the series due in part to their prior history before the Big Bang.

After Dr. Todd creates and disperses a Bang Baby cure in the series finale, Stone takes part in Ebon's plot to steal a canister of the mutagen used in the original Big Bang and stage a larger one to restore their powers along with those of their allies. After Static and Gear foil their plot, Ebon and Stone fight over the mutagen canister, but become exposed to a large quantity of the gas and fuse together into a giant monster with both of their powers called "Ebon-Streak". Static and Gear eventually defeat them, though their fates following this are left unknown.

Stone is based on comic book character Martin "Biz Money B" Scaponi / Hot-Streak, an Italian American gang member who acquired super-speed and friction-based pyrokinesis during the Big Bang. Stone serves as inspiration for the version of Hot-Streak who appears in the comic series Static: Season One.

=== The Meta-Breed ===
The Meta-Breed is a criminal group of Bang Babies.

==== Ebon ====
Ivan Evans, also known as Ebon (voiced by Gary Anthony Sturgis), is a Bang Baby criminal, leader of the Meta-Breed, and older brother of Rubberband Man who resembles an anthropomorphic shadow and possesses powerful umbrakinetic abilities that allow him to create portals to teleport himself or others and control and manipulate darkness and other shadows, though he is vulnerable to strong sources of light. Throughout the series, he attempts to recruit new and powerful Bang Babies into the Meta-Breed, only to continually face opposition from Static, among others.

After Dr. Todd creates and disperses a Bang Baby cure, Ebon launches a plot to steal a canister of the mutagen used in the original Big Bang and stage a larger one to restore his and other like-minded Bang Babies' powers, despite the risk of creating hundreds more. After Static and Gear foil their plot, Ebon and Hot-Streak fight over the mutagen canister, but become exposed to a large quantity of the gas that fuses them together into a giant monster with both of their powers called "Ebon-Streak". Static and Gear eventually defeat them, though their fates following this are left unknown.

A series original character, Ebon was later incorporated into the comics in Static: Season One.

==== Shiv ====
Shiv (voiced by Brian Tochi) is an eccentric and immature member of the Meta-Breed with the ability to form "light energy" constructs from his arms, which he can form into blades and other weapons.

A series original character, Shiv was later incorporated into the comics in 2021's Milestone Comics relaunch, Static: Season One.

==== Talon ====
Teresa, also known as Talon (voiced by Tia Texada), is a teenage Hispanic member of the Meta-Breed who resembles an anthropomorphic bird that possesses wings and a hypersonic shriek. Embittered over her transformation, she aids Ebon and the Meta-Breed throughout the series until Dr. Todd creates and disperses a Bang Baby cure in the series finale. Talon quits the Meta-Breed and tells Static and Gear about Ebon's plot to stage a new Big Bang to restore his powers. Ebon kidnaps her to restore her powers as well, but Static and Gear rescue her while foiling Ebon's plot.

A series original character, Talon was incorporated into the comics in 2021's Milestone Comics relaunch, Static: Season One.

=== Rubberband Man ===
Adam Evans, also known as Rubberband Man (voiced by Kadeem Hardison), is a dyslexic yet talented musician, younger brother of Ebon, and a Bang Baby whose body structure consists of living rubber, which he can shape into a variety of forms and use to disguise himself as others. Prior to becoming a Bang Baby, Rubberband Man worked as a stock clerk at a music store before he joined Ebon's gang in taking part in the gang war that would later erupt into the Big Bang. In the first season, Rubberband Man seeks revenge on a record producer who stole one of his songs. Despite being defeated by Static and arrested by authorities, Rubberband Man breaks out of prison and disguises himself as a musician named "Stringer". After entering a relationship with Sharon Hawkins, he becomes inspired to reform and become a superhero in the second season. He initially clashes with Static, but eventually serves as an older brother figure to him.

Rubberband Man is based on comic book character Karmon Stringer, a former gang member who acquired elastic superpowers during the Big Bang.

=== Daisy Watkins ===
Daisy Watkins (voiced by Crystal Scales) is a student of the Vanmoor Institute, through which she meets Virgil, before transferring to Dakota Union High School.

=== Puff ===
Puff (voiced by Kimberly Brooks) is a volatile and hot-tempered Bang Baby bounty hunter and partner of Onyx with the ability to transform into a gaseous form, which grants flight capabilities and semi-intangibility, but renders her vulnerable to water and powerful gusts of wind. Additionally, she can exhale different forms of vapor such as acidic gas, knockout gas, and flammable gas.

A series original character, Puff was later incorporated into the comics in 2021's Milestone Comics relaunch, Static: Season One.

==== Onyx ====
Onyx (voiced by Kevin Michael Richardson) is a calm and cool-headed Bang Baby bounty hunter and partner of Puff with a purple stone-like body that grants superhuman strength and durability, but slows his movements.

A series original character, Onyx was incorporated into the comics in 2021's Milestone Comics relaunch, Static: Season One.

== Guest characters ==
- Wade (voiced by Omar Gooding): A gang leader and Francis Stone's rival who convinces Virgil to take part in the gang war that would later erupt into the Big Bang.
  - Duke (voiced by Gary Anthony Sturgis): A member of Wade's gang who serves as a lookout and takes part in the gang war that would erupt into the Big Bang.
- Derek Barnett / D-Struct (voiced by Bumper Robinson): A track athlete who suffered a delayed reaction following the Big Bang and was cloaked in a shroud of compressed ionic energy, causing him to resemble a monster. Believing he had no other choice, he joins Ebon's Meta-Breed, but Static persuades him to quit the gang and return to his mother. Following this, he volunteers to become a test subject in Bang Baby research. D-Struct originally appeared in the comic series Static and was redesigned to resemble his animated counterpart in Static: Season One.
- Carmen Dillo (voiced by Matt Ballard in seasons 1–2, Jason Marsden in seasons 2–4): A Bang Baby resembling an anthropomorphic armadillo who possesses a durable carapace and the ability to curl up into a ball and roll at high speeds. He lives in garbage cans and primarily steals food. While he prefers to work alone, he temporarily allies with Ebon's Meta-Breed and Puff's short-lived Meta-Men.
  - Chompus: A dog-like Bang Baby who appears as an associate of Carmen Dillo in the episode "Sons of the Father".
- Bacteria Monster: A bacteria who was affected by the Big Bang and grew to a large size. It is destroyed by Static using disinfectant.
- Leon (voiced by Jonathan Floyd): A student at Dakota Union High School who works in the school newspaper.
- Kim (voiced by Karen Maruyama): A student at Dakota Union High School who works in the school newspaper.
- Omar Harmozi (voiced by Richard Tatum in "Grounded", "Winds of Change", and "Now You See Him...", understudied by Kevin Michael Richardson in "Attack of the Living Brain Puppets"): A student at Dakota Union High School who works in the school newspaper.
- Mr. Janus (voiced by Steve Franken): A janitor at Dakota Union High School.
- "Specs and Trapper" / Spectral and Speed-Trap (voiced by Patton Oswalt and Michael Rosenbaum respectively): Two self-centered students of the Vanmoor Institute who consider themselves smarter than everyone else. Edwin Alva Sr. hires them to capture Static and cure his son Edwin Alva Jr., who had been petrified into a stone statue. After being defeated by Static in their first encounter however, Specs and Trapper build a visor capable of firing colorful energy blasts of varying effects and speed-manipulating gauntlets respectively to become supervillains and seek revenge on Static instead. Ultimately, they are fired by Alva Sr. and defeated by Static once more, after which they are arrested. Sometime later, having broken out of prison and become independent, Specs and Trapper hire Tarmack to steal a cold fusion engine from Alva Industries so they can seek revenge on Alva Sr. and ransom Dakota. After Tarmack steals the engine for himself, Static and Gear defeat Specs and Trapper once again while Rubberband Man subdues Tarmack and disables the engine.
- Barnsdale (voiced by Dennis Haysbert): The Dakota Police Department's chief of police.
- Dwayne McCall (voiced by Blayn Barbosa): A shy, misguided young boy who possesses reality-warping powers, which he primarily uses to conjure his favorite characters into reality. After his stepbrother Aron Price discovers his abilities, he manipulates him into helping him commit crimes until Static discovers them and convinces Dwayne of the truth.
- Aron Price (voiced by R.J. Knoll): A teenage boy who hangs out with unruly crowds and refuses to spend time with his stepbrother Dwayne McCall. Due to being in reform school during the Big Bang and after discovering Dwayne has powers, Aron manipulates him into helping him commit crimes until Static discovers and reveals Aron's true feelings towards Dwayne. Upon learning the truth, Dwayne stops aiding Aron, who is subsequently pinned to a wall by Static and left for the police.
- Sean Foley (voiced by Dan Lauria): Richie's tough, blue-collar father who is racist towards African-Americans, though he resolves to change his ways upon realizing his attitude was hurting his relationship with his son.
- Maggie Foley (voiced by Jean Smart): Richie's soft-spoken yet open-minded mother.
- "Heavy-C" / Slipstream (voiced by Bumper Robinson): A heavy-set teenage bully who steals others' food and suffered a delayed reaction to the Big Bang. Upon gaining aerokinesis, he becomes a supervillain until Static defeats him. After Dr. Todd creates and disperses a Bang Baby cure, Slipstream joins Ebon and other Bang Babies in a failed attempt at regaining their powers.
- Edwin Alva Jr. / Omnifarious (voiced by Matt Ballard in the first appearance, an uncredited Jason Marsden in the second appearance): The scientifically gifted son of Edwin Alva Sr. who, in the hopes of gaining his father's attention and respect, steals a canister of the mutagen used in the Big Bang and invents a suit capable of controlling it to grant himself a variety of different powers. Alva Jr. attacks Alva Industries properties and discovers Static's secret identity along the way, but fails to gain his father's respect. Outraged by this, Alva Jr. attempts to destroy Alva Industries' corporate headquarters using all of his powers at once, but is overloaded by them and petrified. Alva Sr. goes to great lengths to revive his son, which he eventually succeeds in with Static, Gear, and Hot-Streak's help.
- Johnny Morrow / Replay (voiced by Neil Patrick Harris): A washed-up child star who acquired the ability to replicate himself following the Big Bang. He goes on a crime spree until an encounter with Static leads to him accidentally creating a clone of the hero. With the clone Static's assistance, Replay frames the original and attempts to become famous again, but Static and Richie clear the former's name and defeat Replay.
- Thomas Kim / Tantrum (voiced by John Cho): An intelligent, weak-willed teenage Bang Baby who transforms into a purple-skinned, muscular, and violent monster whenever he gets angry. Due to varying circumstances, he transforms into Tantrum and attacks people who angered him. Recalling his mother's advice of letting people work through their anger, Static leads Kim to an abandoned amusement park to let him rampage without hurting anyone until he tires out and turns back. Following this, Static tells Kim's over-demanding parents what happened to help him work out his problems.
- Jean Hawkins (voiced by Alfre Woodard): A paramedic, Robert Hawkins' wife, and Virgil and Sharon's mother who was killed during the Dakota Riots five years prior to the series. After being accidentally sent back in time to the Dakota Riots, Static attempts to save her, but she expresses how proud she is of him before she is killed while resuming her duties.
- Shaquille O'Neal (voiced by himself): An American professional basketball player and old friend of Robert Hawkins who helps Static defeat the Rough Pack.
- Hyde (voiced by Tone Loc): A Bang Baby with thick folded skin that renders him tougher and stronger than regular humans and leader of the short-lived Rough Pack. After Static foils one of their crimes, Hyde leads the gang in seeking revenge on him, only to be defeated by him and Shaquille O'Neal.
- Kangor (voiced by Kevin Michael Richardson): A Bang Baby who gained enhanced lower body strength and increased bone and muscle mass in his feet, granting superhuman jumping and kicking capabilities. Throughout the series, he allies himself with Hyde's short-lived Rough Pack and Joker. He was cured in the series finale.
- Ferret (voiced by Chick Vennera): A Bang Baby with an elongated muzzle that grants an enhanced olfactory system and clawed digits. Due to his lack of combat prowess and offensive abilities, he allies himself with more powerful individuals such as Hyde's short-lived Rough Pack, the Joker, and Ebon's Meta-Breed throughout the series. He was cured in the series finale.
- The Joker (voiced by Mark Hamill): A clown-esque supervillain from Gotham City who comes to Dakota to recruit Bang Babies.
- Bruce Wayne / Batman (voiced by Kevin Conroy): A superhero from Gotham City and a member of the Justice League who pursues the Joker to Dakota to stop him, working with Static along the way. In subsequent appearances, Batman joins forces with Static to defeat Harley Quinn, Poison Ivy, Brainiac, and Timecode.
  - Tim Drake / Robin (voiced by Eli Marienthal in "The Big Leagues", Shane Sweet in "Future Shock"): Batman's sidekick who joins him in traveling to Dakota to stop the Joker.
- Ragtag (voiced by Richard Libertini): A Fagin-esque, homeless old man and Bang Baby who gained the ability to temporarily grant others powers, along with an addictive desire after they wear off, and steal other metahumans' powers. He forces the people he empowers to steal for him in exchange for him "recharging" them until Static and Richie Foley defeat him.
  - Run and Jump (voiced by Philip Tanzini and Kenny Blank respectively): Teenagers that Ragtag granted super-speed and teleportation to respectively who serve him to maintain their powers.
- Byron / Boom (voiced by Rickey D'Shon Collins): A teenage boy who, along with his younger sister Miranda, were taken in by their grandmother after their parents died. After being exposed to spilled mutagen amidst a clean-up effort following the Big Bang, Byron gained a loudspeaker in his chest that allows him to fire powerful sound waves and became more aggressive. He coerces Miranda into helping him commit robberies so he can relive the wealthy lifestyle he previously lived by claiming they are supporting their grandmother. However, Miranda helps Static defeat Byron. After Dr. Todd creates and disperses a Bang Baby cure, Byron joins Ebon and other Bang Babies in a failed attempt at regaining their powers.
- Miranda / Mirage (voiced by Gavin Turek): A young girl who, along with her older brother Byron, were taken in by their grandmother after their parents died. After being exposed to spilled mutagen amidst a clean-up effort following the Big Bang, Miranda gained photokinesis, which allows her to create illusions. Byron coerces her into helping him commit robberies, claiming it is to support their grandmother. Seeing that the mutagen had corrupted him, Miranda joins forces with Static to defeat him. As she is taken away by child protective services, she returns the favor by creating an illusion of Static to convince Sharon that he and Virgil are not the same person.
- Reverend Anderson (voiced by Michael Dorn): The reverend of a Dakota church.
- Maureen Connor / Permafrost (voiced by Hynden Walch): A mentally-ill, cryokinetic preteen Bang Baby who was left homeless following her mother's death and her step-father's desertion. She inadvertently causes trouble with her powers during Christmas until Static learns of her past and reaches out to her. Following this, she is taken in by Reverend Anderson's homeless program.
- Royce Axelrod (voiced by Bumper Robinson): An aggressive and arrogant juvenile delinquent with kleptomania. He and his acquaintance Frankie steal a briefcase, only to find three vials of mutagen previously used in the Big Bang. Hoping to sell them off, Royce keeps it hidden while Frankie uses the accompanying papers to unlock the vials. Once the latter does so, Royce inhales some of the gas. The next day, having grown larger and stronger, he abandons Frankie to drink the mutagen and enhance himself further. Before he can drink it, Royce spontaneously mutates into a monster with reduced intelligence. He attacks anyone who gets too close until Static eventually restrains him.
- Frankie (voiced by Rel Hunt): A student at Dakota Union High School and juvenile delinquent who clings onto Royce Axelrod.
- Trina Jessup (voiced by Sheryl Lee Ralph): A police officer of the Dakota Police Department and Robert Hawkins' girlfriend.
- Maria / Aquamaria (voiced by Erika Velez in "Bad Stretch", Yeni Álvarez in "Wet and Wild"): A Hispanic Bang Baby who was transformed into a hydrokinetic being of living water, though she lacks the ability to change back into her human form. Due to her transformation, she left her family to join Ebon's Meta-Breed, only to be defeated by Static and arrested by the authorities. Eventually, she is chosen by a team of scientists to become the first test subject for a Bang Baby cure, regaining her human form in the process.
- Madelyn Spaulding (voiced by Kimberly Brooks): A self-centered, opinionated, controlling, and unpopular student at Dakota Union High School with no sense of self-examination. After getting caught in the Big Bang, she gained telepathy and mind control, which she uses to turn most of Dakota into "brain puppets" and discover Static's identity. She attempts to brainwash him as well, but his powers hospitalize her, negate her powers, and erase her memory of being a Bang Baby. After eventually being released from the hospital, she is barred from school, reluctantly finds work in a comic book store, and partially regains her memory of fighting Static. Upon gaining telekinesis, she takes over the Meta-Breed, but Static subdues her once more and defeats the Meta-Breed with Gear and She-Bang's help.
- AJ McLean (voiced by himself): A former member of the Backstreet Boys who assists Rubberband Man in getting a record deal.
- Marvin Roper / Replikon (voiced by Coolio): A musically untalented Bang Baby shapeshifter capable of disguising himself as others and altering his molecular structure. Jealous of his former coworker, Rubberband Man's, talent for music and rising success, Replikon seeks revenge by capturing and posing as AJ McLean to steal a record deal from Rubberband Man. However, Replikon is exposed and defeated by Static.
- Jimmy Osgood (voiced by Richard Steven Horvitz): A shy, troubled student at Dakota Union High School and friend of Virgil and Richie's who is constantly bullied by Nick Connor and his friends, Kevin and Ray. Growing tired of Connor, Jimmy steals his father's gun and threatens Connor with it. Frieda and Richie calm Jimmy down, but Kevin and Ray tackle him, causing the gun to go off and shoot Richie in the leg. Aghast at the scene, Jimmy suffers a mental breakdown and is taken to receive treatment at a youth detention center.
- Nick Connor (voiced by Mikey Kelley): A school bully who targets the sheepish Jimmy Osgood, along with his friends, Kevin and Ray. After stuffing Jimmy into a locker, Nick is confronted the next day by Jimmy, who had stolen his father's gun. While Frieda and Richie talk Jimmy out of his rage, he is tackled by Kevin and Ray, causing the gun to go off and shoot Richie in the leg. Following the incident, Nick and his cohorts are suspended from school and sentenced to community service.
- Allie Langford / Nails (voiced by T'Keyah Crystal Keymáh): A teenage Bang Baby who experienced a delayed reaction to the Big Bang and was transmuted into an organic metal form that grants superhuman strength and resilience as well the ability to extend, discharge, and regenerate her sharpened fingernails. While hiding her condition from her peers and loved ones, she desperately searches for a cure on the internet and learns of a supposed Bang Baby clinic in Gotham City. She travels there, only to be manipulated by Harley Quinn and Poison Ivy into helping them hijack a ship containing gold bars in exchange for a cure the pair later reveal is fake. After Batman and Static defeat the villains, Langford tries to take revenge on them, but Static talks her out of it. She later reunites with her family, receives sponsorship for a treatment program established by Bruce Wayne, and gains control over her powers.
- Dr. Harleen Quinzel / Harley Quinn and Dr. Pamela Isley / Poison Ivy (voiced by Arleen Sorkin and Diane Pershing respectively): A pair of supervillains from Gotham City who manipulate Nails into helping them hijack a ship carrying gold bars before they are foiled by Batman and Static.
- Anansi the Spider (voiced by Carl Lumbly): A superhero from Ghana inspired by his mythological namesake who possesses an ancient, golden spider talisman that grants illusionary powers and the ability to cling to and walk on walls and ceilings. A series original character, Anansi was later incorporated into the comics in 2023's Static Team-Up: Anansi.
- Osebo (voiced by Michael Jai White): A leopard-like man with a metal fist and enemy of Anansi who takes inspiration from his mythological namesake.
- Shenice Vale / She-Bang (voiced by Rosslynn Taylor-Jordan): A genetically engineered teenager with superhuman strength, stamina, agility, reflexes, and endurance who was created by her scientist parents, Jonathan and Dolores. Fearing that the company they worked for, Ashton Biotechnics, would abuse her, the Vales went into hiding in Dakota where Shenice joins Static and Gear in fighting crime.
- Jonathan Vale (voiced by Phil Morris): A scientist, former worker at Ashton Biotechnics, and husband of Dolores Vale who created Shenice, who they raised as their own.
- Dolores Vale (voiced by Pamela Tyson in "She-Bang", Kimberly Brooks in "The Parent Trap"): A scientist, former worker at Ashton Biotechnics, and wife of Jonathan who created Shenice, who they raised as their own.
- Crewcut (voiced by Charles Rocket): A mercenary hired by Ashton Biotechnics to capture Jonathan and Dolores Vale, only to be defeated by Static and Gear and arrested by the FBI.
- Tamara Lawrence (voiced by Ariyan A. Johnson): A teenager who was caught in the Big Bang and gained the ability to transform into a monster (voiced by Dee Bradley Baker) with superhuman strength coupled with increased sensitivity to loud noises. She seeks revenge on her ex-boyfriend, Marcus Reed, for breaking up with her by framing him for her monster attacks. However, Static eventually discovers the truth and incapacitates her before she is taken into custody. After Dr. Todd creates and disperses a Bang Baby cure, Lawrence joins Ebon and other Bang Babies in a failed attempt at regaining their powers.
- The Justice League: A group of superheroes, of which Batman and Superman are members, who join forces with Static and Gear to defeat Brainiac.
  - John Stewart / Green Lantern (voiced by Phil LaMarr): A Leaguer and member of the Green Lantern Corps with a power ring that allows him to create hard-light constructs. In a later appearance, he seeks out Static's help in clearing his name after Sinestro steals his Power Battery and frames him for several crimes.
  - Wally West / Flash (voiced by Michael Rosenbaum): A Leaguer with super-speed.
  - J'onn J'onzz / Martian Manhunter (voiced by Carl Lumbly): A Martian Leaguer with numerous powers.
  - Shayera Hol / Hawkgirl (voiced by Maria Canals-Barrera): A Thanagarian Leaguer with bird-like wings and a Nth metal mace.
- Brainiac (voiced by Corey Burton): An alien supercomputer and enemy of Superman and the Justice League.
- Bernie Rast (voiced by Kevin Michael Richardson): A sleazy, loudmouthed TV producer who is always on the look out for a big hit to promote his clients and himself.
- Brandon / Starburst (voiced by David Faustino): A disgruntled employee of Bernie Rast. After learning Rast is making a TV series about Static and Gear, Brandon uses his technological expertise to create a suit capable of absorbing electricity to humiliate Static and steal money to produce his screenplay, though Static and Gear eventually defeat Brandon.
- Lil' Romeo (voiced by himself): A young rapper and actor who comes to Dakota to film a music video about Static.
- The Leech (voiced by David Arquette): A green-skinned metahuman capable of temporarily siphoning the powers and weaknesses of other metahumans. He kidnaps Ebon, Hot-Streak, Talon, and Static for their powers, but Static and Lil' Romeo defeat him.
- Winslow Schott Jr. / Toyman (voiced by Bud Cort): A toy-themed supervillain from Metropolis and enemy of Superman who comes to Dakota to create a new body for his android, Darci.
- Kal-El / Clark Kent / Superman (voiced by George Newbern): A Kryptonian superhero from Metropolis and member of the Justice League who pursues Toyman to Dakota and joins forces with Static to stop him.
- Dr. Koenig / Heavyman (voiced by Ron Perlman): A former scientist at Ashton Biotechnics who worked with Jonathan and Dolores Vale on a project involving more efficient cellular metabolism until the project was cancelled. Though the Vales moved on, Koenig refused to and used himself as a test subject, gaining superhuman strength and durability and the ability to absorb inorganic matter to strengthen himself. In the present, he kidnaps the Vales and threatens to kill them unless they create an antidote for his condition. However, the antidote fails due to his powers increasing his skin's density. While fighting Static, Gear, and She-Bang, Koenig is eventually rendered immobile and arrested by government officials.
- Nina Crocker / Time-Zone (voiced by Rachael MacFarlane): A Bang Baby with uncontrollable chronokinetic powers. After seeking out Static and Gear's help in escaping from Ebon and becoming a superhero, Gear creates a remote and belt to help her control her powers. However, an encounter with Ebon makes Nina realize the dangers of her powers, so she travels back in time to stop herself from being present at the Big Bang. As a result, she now lives a happy, ordinary life with no memory of being a Bang Baby.
- Morris Grant / Soul Power (voiced by Brock Peters): An elderly, retired superhero who protected Dakota in the 1960s after gaining similar powers to Static during an accident at the Hoover Dam. After his arch-nemesis, Professor Menace, resurfaces in the present, Soul Power reunites with his sidekick Sparky and joins forces with Static to defeat him.
  - Phillip Rollins / Sparky (voiced by Rodney Saulsberry): Soul Power's sidekick who invented a suit to mimic his abilities and joined him in fighting crime in the 1970s before becoming a defense satellite developer in the present. After Soul Power's arch-nemesis, Professor Menace, resurfaces, Sparky reluctantly joins forces with Soul Power and Static to defeat him.
- Dennis / Professor Menace (voiced by Terence Stamp): An elderly mad scientist and archenemy of Soul Power who disappeared in 1963 before resurfacing in the present to seek revenge, only to be defeated by Soul Power, Sparky, and Static.
- Timecode: A physicist who became a time-traveling villain. He plotted to help wanted criminals escape into the future only to be defeated by Static, Batman, and Robin and arrested by the Gotham City Police Department.
- Terry McGinnis / Batman (voiced by Will Friedle): Bruce Wayne's successor from 40 years in the future who joins forces with Static and the latter's adult self to defeat Kobra.
- Kobra Leader (voiced by Lance Henriksen): The unnamed leader of the terrorist organization Kobra, which has had several encounters with Terry McGinnis.
- The Jokerz: A street gang and enemies of Batman that modeled themselves off of Joker. Virgil had an encounter with members of J'Man's Jokerz branch when helping Terry. The Jokers were defeated by Virgil and Terry.
  - Coe (voiced by Marc Worden): A member of J'Man's Jokerz branch.
  - Dottie: A member of J'Man's Jokerz branch.
  - Scab: A member of J'Man's Jokerz branch.
  - Smirk: A member of J'Man's Jokerz branch.
  - Spike: A member of J'Man's Jokerz branch.
  - Top Hat Joker: A membr of J'Man's Jokerz branch.
- Mmoboro (voiced by Phil LaMarr): A giant green hornet who can turn into a swarm of smaller wasps and enemy of Anansi who takes inspiration from his mythological namesake.
- Onini (voiced by Kevin Michael Richardson): A giant black python and enemy of Anansi who takes inspiration from his mythological namesake.
- Sinestro (voiced by Ted Levine): An enemy of the Green Lantern Corps who possesses his own power ring. He steals Green Lantern's Power Battery and frames him for several crimes until he is exposed and defeated by Static and Green Lantern.
- Night-Breed: A group of yellow-eyed, photosensitive Bang Babies who are forced to live underground during the day. Ebon recruits them to plunge Dakota into darkness, but Static and Gear convince some of the Night-Breed to help them stop him.
  - Gail / Nightingale (voiced by Colleen O'Shaughnessey): A Bang Baby who can generate and manipulate dark matter, which she uses to protect herself and her fellow Night-Breed. After reluctantly taking part in Ebon's plot, she helps Static and Gear defeat him.
  - Brickhouse (voiced by Dawnn Lewis): Nightingale's best friend who gained the ability to transmute her body into a living brick-like state. After Gail turns against Ebon, Brickhouse joins her in doing the same. Brickhouse was later incorporated into Static: Season One.
  - Tech (voiced by Freddy Rodriguez): A Bang Baby with superhuman intelligence. He willingly helps Ebon in his plot until Static and Gear thwart the latter, after which Tech decides to work on a cure for the Night-Breed's photosensitivity.
  - Fade (voiced by Freddy Rodriguez): A Bang Baby who can turn intangible. He sides with Ebon until the latter is foiled.
- Hoop Squad: A group of NBA players who secretly operate as superheroes using bio-enhancer super-suits.
  - Karl Malone / Pulverizer (voiced by himself): A member of the Hoop Squad whose suit allows him to increase the size of his hands.
  - Tracy McGrady / Spin Drive (voiced by Phil LaMarr): A member of the Hoop Squad whose suit allows him to rotate his body at super-speed and create vortexes.
  - Yao Ming / Centerforce (voiced by Jen Sung Outerbridge): A member of the Hoop Squad whose suit allows him to extend his limbs.
  - Steve Nash / Point Man (voiced by Chris Cox): A member of the Hoop Squad whose suit allows him to fire various types of projectiles from his fingers.
  - Mason Andrews (voiced by David Paymer): A scientist who works for the National Biotech Authority and created the Hoop Squad's suits.
  - La Gata (voiced by Kath Soucie): Andrews' robot assistant.
- Doctor Odium (voiced by David Ogden Stiers): A mad scientist, expert in bio-tactical artificial intelligence and robotics, and enemy of the Hoop Squad. He used to work for the NBA (National Biotech Authority) until he turned traitor when the government refused to let him test his nanites on humans. After perfecting his nanites, they trapped him in cryogenic stasis, formed a construct resembling him, and mount an effort to extort the NBA. After capturing Gear, the nanites attempt to recruit him, but are defeated by Static and the Hoop Squad.
- Eddie Felson / Speedwarp (voiced by James Arnold Taylor): A nerdy teenager who was known as "Weird Eddie" and developed an obsessive crush on Daisy. After stealing a "Time Gauntlet", which allows the wearer to move at super-speed, from the laboratory he interns at, he steals gifts for and later stalks Daisy, discovers Static and Gear's secret identities, and makes a failed attempt on his boss, Dr. McDonald's, life. Gear later acquires McDonald's notes and uses them to create a one-use-only "Time Belt" for Static so he can stop Felson. In the ensuing battle, the former causes the Time Gauntlet to malfunction and leave Felson moving in slow-motion.
- Dr. McDonald (voiced by Alan Young): A scientist and inventor of the Time Gauntlet that Eddie Felson worked for.
- Tarmack (voiced by John DiMaggio): A dimwitted Bang Baby resembling anthropomorphic tarmac who is as strong and tough as tar and able to melt obstacles, though he is vulnerable to water. Specs and Trapper recruit him to steal a cold fusion engine for them, but Tarmack steals it for himself until Static, Gear, and Rubberband Man defeat the villains.
- Dulé Jones (voiced by Marshall Jones): A former gang member and Bang Baby with retractable metal tentacles on his back. Following the Big Bang, he gave up his gang lifestyle to pursue professional football. However, his partner Chainlink extorts him, threatening to reveal his secret. In their ensuing fight, Dulé goes public and receives help from Static, Gear, and several football players to defeat Chainlink.
- Troy / Chainlink (voiced by Bumper Robinson): A former gang member, Bang Baby, and partner of Dulé Jones who also acquired metal tentacles on his back, though he is unable to retract them and gained the additional ability to absorb metal as he was exposed to more gas than Dulé. Jealous of Dulé's successful career, Chainlink attempts to extort him, only to be defeated by him, Static, Gear, and several football players and arrested by the police.
- Dr. Donald Todd (voiced by Ed Begley Jr.): A scientist at GenomaTech who works on a cure for Bang Babies.
- Dr. Karen Roberts / Omnara (voiced by Wendie Malick): A scientist for Alva Industries who was in charge of a project meant to find and expose Static's secret identity before Edwin Alva Sr. cut off her funding following his son, Edwin Alva Jr.'s, revival. Angry at Alva Sr. for this, she discovers Static's identity for herself and hires Puff and Onyx to kidnap Robert Hawkins to blackmail Static into stealing components necessary for her plot to control every computer in the world. However, Gear develops an anti-virus to stop Omnara, who suffers brain damage and is taken away by paramedics.
