= List of Darker than Black episodes =

Darker than Black is a Japanese anime television series created and directed by Tensai Okamura and animated by Bones. The series was broadcast for twenty-five episodes on MBS, TBS and their affiliated stations from April 6 to September 28, 2007. (Note: MBS listed the air dates for the series on Thursday at 25:25, which is Friday at 1:25 a.m. JST.)

A sequel, titled Darker than Black: Gemini of the Meteor was broadcast for twelve episodes from October 9 to December 25, 2009. (Note: MBS listed the air dates for the series on Thursday at 25:25, which is Friday at 1:25 a.m. JST.)

A sidesequel to Darker than Black and a prequel to Darker than Black: Gemini of the Meteor, titled Darker than Black: Gaiden, was included on the second, fourth, sixth and eighth collected Blu-ray and DVD sets of Darker than Black: Gemini of the Meteor released from January 27 to July 21, 2010.

== Series overview ==
Season	Episodes	Originally released		
Season	Episodes	First released	Last released	Network
1	25 + 1	April 6, 2007	September 28, 2007	MBS
2	12	October 9, 2009	December 25, 2009	MBS

== Episode list ==
=== Darker than Black (2007) ===
No.	Title	Directed by	Written by	Original release date	English air date
1	"The Fallen Star of a Contract (Part 1)"; Transliteration: "Keiyaku no Hoshi wa Nagareta (Zenpen)" (Japanese: 契約の星は流れた(前編))	Tensai Okamura	Tensai Okamura	April 6, 2007	June 16, 2010
2	"The Fallen Star of a Contract (Part 2)"; Transliteration: "Keiyaku no Hoshi wa Nagareta (Kōhen)" (Japanese: 契約の星は流れた(後編))	Takefumi Anzai	Tensai Okamura	April 13, 2007	June 17, 2010
3	"A New Star Shines in the Dawn Sky (Part 1)"; Transliteration: "Shinsei wa Shinonome no Sora ni Kirameku (Zenpen)" (Japanese: 新星は東雲の空に煌く(前編))	Shingo Kaneko	Yuuichi Nomura	April 20, 2007	June 18, 2010
4	"A New Star Shines in the Dawn Sky (Part 2)"; Transliteration: "Shinsei wa Shinonome no Sora ni Kirameku (Kōhen)" (Japanese: 新星は東雲の空に煌く(後編))	Tomoko Hiramuki	Yuuichi Nomura	April 30, 2007	June 21, 2010
5	"Red Giant over Eastern Europe (Part 1)"; Transliteration: "Saiyaku no Akaki Yume wa Tōō ni Kiete (Zenpen)" (Japanese: 災厄の紅き夢は東欧に消えて(前編))	Takefumi Anzai	Shōtarō Suga	May 4, 2007	June 22, 2010
6	"Red Giant over Eastern Europe (Part 2)"; Transliteration: "Saiyaku no Akaki Yume wa Tōō ni Kiete (Kōhen)" (Japanese: 災厄の紅き夢は東欧に消えて(後編))	Hideyo Yamamoto	Shōtarō Suga	May 11, 2007	June 23, 2010
7	"The Scent of Gardenias Lingers in the Summer Rain (Part 1)"; Transliteration: "Samidare ni Kuchinashi wa Kaori o Hanachi (Zenpen)" (Japanese: 五月雨にクチナシは香りを放ち(前編))	Shingo Kaneko	Shinsuke Onishi	May 18, 2007	June 24, 2010
8	"The Scent of Gardenias Lingers in the Summer Rain (Part 2)"; Transliteration: "Samidare ni Kuchinashi wa Kaori o Hanachi (Kōhen)" (Japanese: 五月雨にクチナシは香りを放ち(後編))	Kei Tsunematsu	Shinsuke Onishi	May 25, 2007	June 25, 2010
9	"The White Dress, Stained with the Girl's Dreams and Blood (Part 1)"; Transliteration: "Junpaku no Doresu wa Shōjo no Yume to Chi ni Somaru (Zenpen)" (Japanese: 純白のドレスは少女の夢と血に染まる(前編))	Takefumi Anzai	Kurasumi Sunayama	June 1, 2007	June 28, 2010
10	"The White Dress, Stained with the Girl's Dreams and Blood (Part 2)"; Transliteration: "Junpaku no Doresu wa Shōjo no Yume to Chi ni Somaru (Kōhen)" (Japanese: 純白のドレスは少女の夢と血に染まる(後編))	Shingo Kaneko	Kurasumi Sunayama	June 8, 2007	June 29, 2010
11	"When One Takes Back What Was Lost Within the Wall (Part 1)"; Transliteration: "Kabe no Naka, Nakushita Mono o Torimodosu Toki (Zenpen)" (Japanese: 壁の中、なくしたものを取り戻すとき(前編))	Daisuke Chiba	Shōtarō Suga	June 15, 2007	June 30, 2010
12	"When One Takes Back What Was Lost Within the Wall (Part 2)"; Transliteration: "Kabe no Naka, Nakushita Mono o Torimodosu Toki (Kōhen)" (Japanese: 壁の中、なくしたものを取り戻すとき(後編))	Hideyo Yamamoto	Shōtarō Suga	June 22, 2007	July 1, 2010
13	"A Heart Unswaying on the Water's Surface (Part 1)"; Transliteration: "Gin'iro no Yoru, Kokoro wa Suimen ni Yureru Koto Naku (Zenpen)" (Japanese: 銀色の夜、心は水面に揺れることなく(前編))	Takefumi Anzai	Shinsuke Onishi	June 29, 2007	July 2, 2010
14	"A Heart Unswaying on the Water's Surface (Part 2)"; Transliteration: "Gin'iro no Yoru, Kokoro wa Suimen ni Yureru Koto Naku (Kōhen)" (Japanese: 銀色の夜、心は水面に揺れることなく(後編))	Shingo Kaneko	Shinsuke Onishi	July 6, 2007	July 5, 2010
15	"Memories of Betrayal in an Amber Smile (Part 1)"; Transliteration: "Uragiri no Kioku wa Kohakuiro no Hohoemi (Zenpen)" (Japanese: 裏切りの記憶は琥珀色の微笑み(前編))	Satoshi Toba	Yuuichi Nomura	July 13, 2007	July 6, 2010
16	"Memories of Betrayal in an Amber Smile (Part 2)"; Transliteration: "Uragiri no Kioku wa Kohakuiro no Hohoemi (Kōhen)" (Japanese: 裏切りの記憶は琥珀色の微笑み(後編))	Daisuke Chiba	Yuuichi Nomura	July 20, 2007	July 7, 2010
17	"A Love Song Sung from a Trash Heap (Part 1)"; Transliteration: "Hakidame de Rabu Songu o Utau (Zenpen)" (Japanese: 掃きだめでラブソングを歌う(前編))	Takefumi Anzai	Kurasumi Sunayama	July 27, 2007	July 8, 2010
18	"A Love Song Sung from a Trash Heap (Part 2)"; Transliteration: "Hakidame de Rabu Songu o Utau (Kōhen)" (Japanese: 掃きだめでラブソングを歌う(後編))	Eiichi Kuboyama	Kurasumi Sunayama	August 3, 2007	July 9, 2010
19	"Dreaming Shallow, Uninebriated (Part 1)"; Transliteration: "Asaki Yumemishi, Yoi mo Sezu (Zenpen)" (Japanese: あさき夢見し、酔いもせず(前編))	Shingo Kaneko	Shinsuke Onishi	August 10, 2007	July 12, 2010
20	"Dreaming Shallow, Uninebriated (Part 2)"; Transliteration: "Asaki Yumemishi, Yoi mo Sezu (Kōhen)" (Japanese: あさき夢見し、酔いもせず(後編))	Daisuke Chiba	Shinsuke Onishi	August 17, 2007	July 13, 2010
21	"City Under Crackdown, Moist with Tears (Part 1)"; Transliteration: "Shukusei no Machi wa Namida ni Nurete (Zenpen)" (Japanese: 粛正の街は涙に濡れて(前編))	Satoshi Toba	Shōtarō Suga	August 31, 2007	July 14, 2010
22	"City Under Crackdown, Moist with Tears (Part 2)"; Transliteration: "Shukusei no Machi wa Namida ni Nurete (Kōhen)" (Japanese: 粛正の街は涙に濡れて(後編))	Hideyo Yamamoto	Shōtarō Suga	September 7, 2007	July 15, 2010
23	"God is In His Heaven"; Transliteration: "Kami wa Ten ni Imashi" (Japanese: 神は天にいまし)	Takefumi Anzai	Shinsuke Onishi	September 14, 2007	July 16, 2010
24	"Meteor Shower"; Transliteration: "Ryūseiu" (Japanese: 流星雨)	Daisuke Chiba	Kurasumi Sunayama	September 21, 2007	July 19, 2010
25	"Does the Reaper Dream of Darkness Darker than Black?"; Transliteration: "Shinigami no Miru Yume wa, Kuro yori Kurai Kurayami ka?" (Japanese: 死神の見る夢は、黒より暗い暗闇か?)	Tensai Okamura	Shōtarō Suga	September 28, 2007	July 20, 2010
26–OVA	"Beneath Cherry Blossoms in Full Bloom"; Transliteration: "Sakura no Hana no Mankai no Shita" (Japanese: 桜の花の満開の下)	Tensai Okamura	Shōtarō Suga	March 26, 2008	July 30, 2010

=== Darker than Black: Gemini of the Meteor (2009) ===
No. overall	No. in season	Title	Directed by	Written by	Original air date	English air date
27	1	"Black Cats Do Not Dream of Stars"; Transliteration: "Kuroneko wa Hoshi no Yume o Minai" (Japanese: 黒猫は星の夢を見ない)	Tensai Okamura	Tensai Okamura	October 9, 2009	August 6, 2010
28	2	"Fallen Meteor"; Transliteration: "Ochita Ryūsei" (Japanese: 堕ちた流星)	Daisuke Chiba	Hiroyuki Yoshino	October 16, 2009	August 13, 2010
29	3	"Vanishing in a Sea of Ice"; Transliteration: "Hyōgen ni Kieru" (Japanese: 氷原に消える)	Koichi Hatsumi	Hiroyuki Yoshino	October 23, 2009	August 20, 2010
30	4	"The Ark Adrift on the Lake"; Transliteration: "Hakobune wa Kosui ni Tayutau" (Japanese: 方舟は湖水に揺蕩う)	Tarou Iwasaki	Mari Okada	October 30, 2009	August 27, 2010
31	5	"Gunsmoke Blows, Life Flows"; Transliteration: "Shōen wa Nagare, Inochi wa Nagare" (Japanese: 硝煙は流れ、命は流れ)	Hideyo Yamamoto	Mari Okada	November 6, 2009	September 3, 2010
32	6	"An Aroma Sweet, a Heart Bitter"; Transliteration: "Kaori wa Amaku, Kokoro wa Nigaku" (Japanese: 香りは甘く、心は苦く)	Yuriko Sugaya	Mari Okada	November 13, 2009	September 10, 2010
33	7	"The Doll Sings in the Winter Wind"; Transliteration: "Kazabana ni ningyou wa utau" (Japanese: 風花に人形は唄う)	Shingo Kaneko	Shinsuke Onishi	November 20, 2009	September 17, 2010
34	8	"Twinkling Sun on a Summer Day"; Transliteration: "Natsu no Hi, Taiyō wa Yurete" (Japanese: 夏の日、太陽はゆれて)	Hideki Ito	Shinsuke Onishi	November 27, 2009	September 24, 2010
35	9	"They Met One Day, Unexpectedly"; Transliteration: "Deai wa Aru Hi Totsuzen ni" (Japanese: 出会いはある日突然に)	Keisuke Onishi	Shinsuke Onishi	December 4, 2009	October 1, 2010
36	10	"Your Smile on a False Street Corner"; Transliteration: "Itsuwari no Machikado ni Kimi no Hohoemi o" (Japanese: 偽りの街角に君の微笑みを)	Nao Higa	Mari Okada	December 11, 2009	October 8, 2010
37	11	"The Sea Floor Dries Up, and the Moon Grows Full"; Transliteration: "Suitei wa Kawaki, Tsuki wa Michiru" (Japanese: 水底は乾き、月は満ちる)	Hideyo Yamamoto	Shōtarō Suga	December 18, 2009	October 15, 2010
38	12	"Ark of Stars"; Transliteration: "Hoshi no Hakobune" (Japanese: 星の方舟)	Tensai Okamura	Shōtarō Suga	December 25, 2009	October 22, 2010
