= Nika Futterman =

American actress and singer (born 1969)

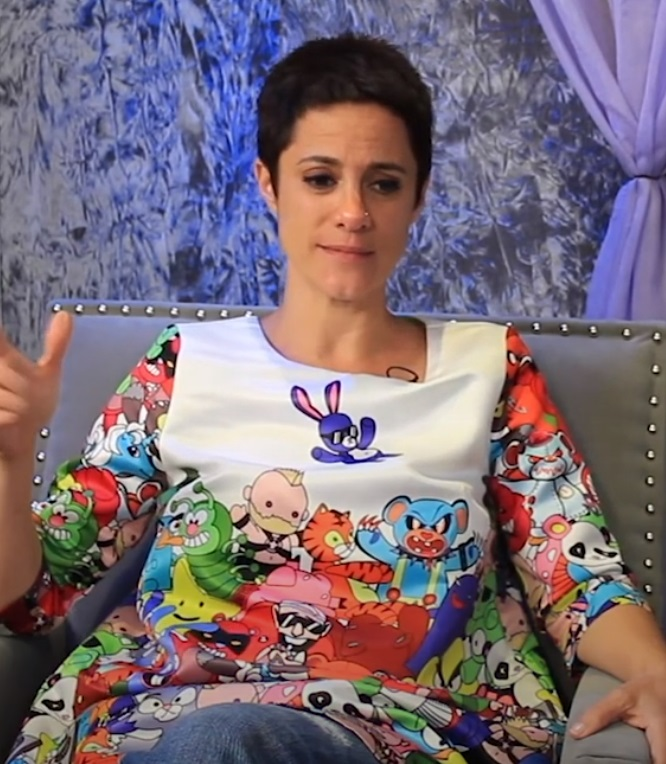
- Futterman in 2021
- Born: October 25, 1969 (age 57); New York City, U.S.
- Occupations: Actress; voice actress; comedian; singer
- Years active: 1995–present
- Spouse: Teddy Xentaras
- Children: 1
- Website: nika-futterman.com

Nika Futterman (born October 25, 1969) is an American actress, voice actress, comedian and singer. She is known for her many roles in various animated series, including Mike in Mike, Lu & Og, Asajj Ventress in Star Wars: The Clone Wars, Stretch and Squeeze in Handy Manny, Cuckoo-Loca in Minnie's Bow-Toons, Miguel in Maya & Miguel, and Adam Lyon in My Gym Partner's a Monkey. She has voiced many characters for Nickelodeon, including Omnia in the Nickelodeon version of Winx Club, Chum Chum in Fanboy and Chum Chum, Olga Pataki in Hey Arnold!, Belle Pepper in Sanjay and Craig, and Luna Loud in The Loud House.

== Personal life ==
Futterman was born on October 25, 1969, in New York City. Her father was a record producer. She initially had wanted to become a sketch comedian prior to becoming a voice actor.

== Career ==
Among her first professional acting roles were single episode appearances on Chicago Hope and Murphy Brown.

=== Voice acting ===
Futterman has provided her voice in many cartoons, including recurring roles on animated adventure and superhero series such as G.I. Joe: Renegades, Batman: The Brave and the Bold, and The Avengers: Earth's Mightiest Heroes.

Futterman is the voice of Asajj Ventress in the 2008 animated film The Clone Wars and its subsequent TV series as well as several related video games. She has provided the voice for Sy Snootles among other characters. She attended her first Star Wars Weekend on the last weekend of June 2012. She was on the show Behind the Force along with her cast members Ashley Eckstein and James Arnold Taylor with Supervising Director Dave Filoni. Futterman also voices Sticks the Badger in the Sonic Boom TV series and its associated video games, Sonic Boom: Shattered Crystal and Sonic Boom: Rise of Lyric.

Futterman also voiced Shaeeah Lawquane and Asajj Ventress in Star Wars: The Bad Batch.

=== Singing career ===
Futterman performed the vocals "Give it to me, baby" in The Offspring's hit single "Pretty Fly (For a White Guy)" and cameo backup vocals for a performance of Wham!'s "Careless Whisper" on an episode of Kids Incorporated. Some of Futterman's animated characters sing songs within the soundtrack of a show, as well. She sings the theme song of My Gym Partner's a Monkey in-character as Adam Lyon, Sandy of Bubble Guppies sings a song about coconut water several times in the episode she is featured in, Kip Ling of Histeria! usually only shows up in the songs on the show, the second title character of Fanboy & Chum Chum sings many times (Futterman is also often accompanied on lead vocals during the FB&CC songs by David Hornsby, who voices Fanboy), Stretch and Squeeze of Handy Manny sing two songs called "We Work Together" and "Hop Up, Jump In" alongside the other tools, and Luna Loud of The Loud House is a musician, and frequently sings. Futterman also performed the vocals as Catwoman for the song, "Birds of Prey" in the Batman: The Brave and the Bold episode, "The Mask of Matches Malone," along with Grey DeLisle and Tara Strong, who voiced Black Canary and Huntress respectively.

== Filmography ==
=== Animated television ===
- The Adventures of Kid Danger - Junior, College Girl, Additional voices
- Adventure Time – Gridface Princess, Additional voices
- American Dad! – Additional voices
- Archer – Barbie Zissner, Brigitte, Dr. Gertrude Rilsa, Sia
- Avatar: The Last Airbender – Smellerbee
- Avengers Assemble – Gamora
- The Avengers: Earth's Mightiest Heroes – Sif, Hela
- Back at the Barnyard – Stamps
- Batman: The Brave and the Bold – Catwoman, Lashina
- Blaze and the Monster Machines – Paulina, Crab 3
- Bubble Guppies – Sandy
- Bob and Margaret – Additional voices
- The Casagrandes – Alexis Flores (Season 1), Luna Loud
- CatDog – Lola Caricola
- ChalkZone – Veronica Sanchez
- Chowder – Additional voices
- Clarence – Sammy, additional voices
- The Cleveland Show – Additional voices
- Costume Quest – Kimberly Butterwear
- Danger Rangers – Cancun Reporter, Raccoon Kid #1
- DC Super Hero Girls – Hawkgirl
- Dexter's Laboratory – Additional voices
- Doc McStuffins – Rosie the Rescuer
- El Tigre: The Adventures of Manny Rivera – Additional voices
- The Family Chronicles Time – Runa
- Fanboy & Chum Chum – Chum Chum, additional voices
- Futurama – Additional voices
- Generator Rex – Additional voices
- G.I. Joe: Renegades – Lady Jaye, Female Reporter, Sheriff's Clerk
- The Grim Adventures of Billy & Mandy – Dora
- Guardians of the Galaxy – Angela
- Hanazuki: Full of Treasures – Flochis
- Handy Manny – Stretch, Squeeze & Gabriela (Season 1)
- Hardboiled Eggheads – Pilar Escobar
- Harvey Birdman, Attorney at Law – Debbie, Newscaster 1
- Hey Arnold! – Olga Pataki
- Histeria! – Kip Ling, additional voices
- Hulk and the Agents of S.M.A.S.H. – Gamora, Lilandra Neramani
- If You Give a Mouse a Cookie – Bright Shirt Girl
- It's Pony – Candle Lady, Woman, Old Woman
- Jake and the Never Land Pirates – Additional voices
- Jakers! The Adventures of Piggley Winks – Seamus, Sean
- Johnny Bravo – Additional voices
- Kick Buttowski: Suburban Daredevil – Additional voices
- Kim Possible – Zita Flores
- Kung Fu Panda: Legends of Awesomeness – Additional voices
- The Land Before Time – Ruby's Mother, Ali
- The Legend of Korra – Ahnah
- The Lion Guard – Zira
- Lost in Oz – West, Triplet #1, Triplet #2, Triplet #3
- The Loud House – Luna Loud, Boris, Mrs. Salter, Additional voices
- Maya & Miguel – Miguel Santos
- The Mighty B! – Additional voices
- Mike, Lu & Og – Mike Mazinsky
- Miles from Tomorrowland – Additional voices
- Mickey Mouse Clubhouse – Singing Lock
- Mickey Mouse Clubhouse+ – Cuckoo-Loca
- Mickey Mouse Funhouse – Cuckoo-Loca
- Mickey Mouse Mixed-Up Adventures – Cuckoo-Loca, Mrs. Thunderboom, Cuckoo La-La, Additional voices
- Minnie's Bow-Toons – Cuckoo-Loca
- My Gym Partner's a Monkey – Adam Lyon, Ms. Chameleon, Margaret Rhino, Donna Dorsal, various voices
- The New Woody Woodpecker Show – Splinter
- NFL Rush Zone – Ash Reynolds (Seasons 2–3)
- Paranormal Action Squad – PAD
- The Penguins of Madagascar – Automated Female Voice, Female Ad Executive, additional voices
- Pig Goat Banana Cricket – Junior Ranger, Fan on Bus
- Pound Puppies – Additional voices (uncredited)
- The Powerpuff Girls – Additional voices
- The Problem Solverz – Stratch
- Random! Cartoons – Lulu, Cathy
- Randy Cunningham: 9th Grade Ninja – Additional voices
- Regular Show – Additional voices
- Rugrats – Additional voices
- Rugrats Pre-School Daze – Matthew
- Rolling with the Ronks! – Mila (pilot)
- Sanjay and Craig – Belle Pepper, additional voices
- Scooby-Doo! Mystery Incorporated – Additional voices
- The 7D – Additional voices
- Shimmer and Shine – Dalia
- The Simpsons – Additional voices
- Sofia the First – Fortune Teller
- Sonic Boom – Sticks
- Squirrel Boy – Wanda Finkster
- Star vs. the Forces of Evil – Additional voices
- Star Wars Rebels – Presence
- Star Wars: Tales of the Underworld – Asajj Ventress
- Star Wars: The Bad Batch – Fauja, Shaeeah, Asajj Ventress
- Star Wars: The Clone Wars – Asajj Ventress, Sy Snootles, TC-70, Shaeeah, Dono, Gardulla the Hutt
- Stroker & Hoop – Keith, Danny, Goldie Hawn, Secretary, Kid 2
- The Super Hero Squad Show – Captain Brazil
- Teacher's Pet – Margarita Ratoncita
- Teen Titans Go! – Sonia Conchita Hernández
- Tenkai Knights – Beni / Venetta (English version)
- The Tom and Jerry Show – Polly
- Turbo Fast – Additional voices
- Ultimate Spider-Man – Gamora, Kid
- Vampirina – Buttons
- The Wacky Adventures of Ronald McDonald: Scared Silly – Fry Kid #3
- The Wingfeather Saga – Orble
- Winx Club (Nickelodeon version) – Omnia
- Woody Woodpecker – Knothead
- Xyber 9: New Dawn – Anakonda
- Young Justice – Female Forager
- The Zula Patrol – Wigg

=== Animated films ===
List of voice performances in direct-to-video and television films
Year	Title	Role	Notes
1998	The Wacky Adventures of Ronald McDonald: Scared Silly	Fry Kid #3	
2003	Charlotte's Web 2: Wilbur's Great Adventure	Baby Rats	
2005	The Land Before Time XI: Invasion of the Tinysauruses	Rocky	
2006	The Land Before Time XII: The Great Day of the Flyers	Petrie's Brothers and Sisters, Tricia	
2008	Dragonlance: Dragons of Autumn Twilight	Takhisis, Slave #3	
2008	Dead Space: Downfall	Alissa Vincent	
2011	LEGO Star Wars: The Padawan Menace	Jempa, Asajj Ventress	
2013	Scooby-Doo! Mask of the Blue Falcon	Jennifer Severin	
2016	DC Super Hero Girls: Super Hero High	Hawkgirl	
2016	DC Super Hero Girls: Hero of the Year	Hawkgirl	
2016	Only Yesterday	Granny	
2017	DC Super Hero Girls: Intergalactic Games	Hawkgirl	
2017	Hey Arnold!: The Jungle Movie	Olga Pataki	
2018	Scooby-Doo! & Batman: The Brave and the Bold	Catwoman	
2018	DC Super Hero Girls: Legends of Atlantis	Hawkgirl	
2021	The Loud House Movie	Luna Loud	
2021	Mickey's Tale of Two Witches	Cuckoo-Loca, Spooky-Loca	
2021	Mickey and Minnie Wish Upon a Christmas	Cuckoo-Loca	
2022	Marmaduke	Juan Pedro	
2022	Rise of the Teenage Mutant Ninja Turtles: The Movie	News Anchor Tanya, Various voices	
2024	No Time to Spy: A Loud House Movie	Luna Loud	
2025	A Loud House Christmas Movie: Naughty or Nice	Luna Loud	

Theatrical animated films

- Alpha and Omega – Porcupines
- The Ant Bully – Ant #1, Ant #7
- Barnyard – Additional voices
- The Boxtrolls – Oil Can, Knickers
- Casper's Scare School – Monaco
- Delgo – Elder Jaspin
- Fall Down a School – Ana Julia, Yasmin
- Geppetto's Secret – Magic Wood, Pinocchio
- The Loud House: Slice of Life – Luna Loud
- The Marvel Experience – Madame Hydra/Viper
- Open Season – Rosie
- Open Season 2 – Rosie
- Open Season 3 – Rosie
- Rango – Akiano
- Star Wars: The Clone Wars – TC-70, Asajj Ventress
- The Wild – Dung Beetle #1

=== Live-action television ===
- A Stranger Among Us – Narrator (voice)
- Calls – 911 LA
- Chicago Hope – Nikki Hodge
- Diagnosis: Murder – Ragna Clark
- The Huntress – Olivia
- Murphy Brown – Laura
- Shasta McNasty – Photographer
- Shushybye – Dreamsters PJ, Starbright, Snore (voices)
- The Wayans Bros. – Assistant

=== Video games ===
- Army Men: Air Attack 2 – Bombshell
- Army Men: Sarge's Heroes 2 – Bridgette Bleu
- Blue Dragon – Marumaro, Kelaso Village Old Woman
- Blur – Narrator
- Brütal Legend – Mombat, Daughterbat
- Castle of Illusion – Mizrabel
- Crimson Skies: High Road to Revenge – Maria "Bloody Mary" Sanchez, Matilda, Multiplayer Voice
- Destiny – Eva Levante, Roni 55–30, Kadi 55–30, City Vendor Frame, City P.A.
- Destiny 2: Lightfall – Eva Levante, Kadi 55–30, Female Vendor Frame
- Destroy All Humans! – Silhouette
- Disney Infinity 3.0 – Gamora
- Doom Eternal – Khan Maykr, Dr. Elena Richardson
- Doom: The Dark Ages – Revelations – Khan Maykr
- Dune Awakening - Zoe, Ajani Kassa, Lady Ilith Richese
- Evil Dead: Regeneration – Sally Bowline
- Evolve – Sunny
- Fast & Furious: Showdown – Letty Ortiz
- Final Fantasy XIII – Cocoon Inhabitants
- For Honor – Runa
- Grand Theft Auto: San Andreas – Pedestrian
- Guild Wars Factions – Vizu
- Guild Wars 2 – Aurene
- Halo 3 – Marines
- Halo 3: ODST – Marines
- Halo Wars 2 – Alice-130
- Heroes of the Storm – Zagara
- inFAMOUS 2 – Nix
- Jurassic Park: The Game – Nima Cruz
- Justice League Heroes – Killer Frost
- Kid Icarus: Uprising – Pandora (English dub)
- Kinect Star Wars – Shu Mai
- Kingdom of Paradise – Yui Min
- Law & Order: Dead on the Money – Eva Stanton, Lucy Traine
- Lego Star Wars III: The Clone Wars – Asajj Ventress
- Lost Odyssey – Mack
- Mad Max – Additional voices
- Marathon - Recon
- Mato Anomalies – Lady Edelweiss
- Mario & Sonic at the Rio 2016 Olympic Games – Sticks
- Marvel Rivals – Hela
- Marvel: Ultimate Alliance – Black Widow, Deathbird, Volla, Valkyrie
- Marvel: Ultimate Alliance 2 – Black Widow
- Marvel Ultimate Alliance 3: The Black Order – Hela
- Master of Orion: Conquer the Stars – Darlok Advisor, Mrrshan Advisor
- Metal Gear Solid 4: Guns of the Patriots – Additional voices (English dub) Raging Raven (Beauty Voice)
- Neopets: Petpet Adventures: The Wand of Wishing – Dark Faerie Guardian
- Nicktoons MLB – Chum Chum
- Pirates of the Caribbean: The Legend of Jack Sparrow – Madame Tang, Nassau Village Female #2, Scarlett
- Psychonauts – Dogen Boole, Whispering Rocket Lady, First Rainbow Squirt
- Rage 2 – Screaming Death, Oni Mega, Abadon Rusher, Lagooney Civilian
- Ratchet: Deadlocked – Juanita Alvaro, Hydro Girl, Janice, Kid B, Baby Seal
- Ratchet & Clank: Into the Nexus – Vendra Prog, Zurkon Jr.
- Resident Evil: Operation Raccoon City – Lupo
- Saints Row – Stilwater's Resident
- Shark Tale – Mrs. Sanchez
- Skylanders: SuperChargers – Nightfall
- Spider-Man 3 – Dr. Stillwell
- Star Wars: The Clone Wars – Republic Heroes – Asajj Ventress
- Star Wars: The Old Republic – Treek, Agent Halloway, Chemish Or, Danla Zin, Doctor Senessa, Labine, Lady Muriel Corwin, Lady of Pain, Melarra, Promised One Baral, Rehanna Rist, Sraja
- StarCraft series
  - StarCraft II: Wings of Liberty – Jessica Hall, Queen
  - StarCraft II: Heart of the Swarm – Zagara, Zerg Queen
  - StarCraft II: Legacy of the Void – Zagara, Zerg Queen
- Sonic the Hedgehog series
  - Fire & Ice – Sticks
  - Rise of Lyric – Sticks, Doc Ginger
  - Shattered Crystal – Sticks
  - Sonic Dash 2 – Sticks
- Tales of Symphonia – Undine, Yutis
- Tenkai Knights: Brave Battle – Beni / Venetta
- The Matrix: Path of Neo – Switch, Witch Boss
- The Punisher – Lieutenant Molly Von Richthofen
- Tom Clancy's EndWar – Captain Ilaria Cimino
- Tribes: Vengeance – Esther
- Vader Immortal: A Star Wars VR Series – Episode III – Wannek
- Vampire: The Masquerade – Bloodlines – Velvet Velour, additional voices
- XCOM: Chimera Squad - Mayor Nightingale
