= Sonic Boom =

A sonic boom is a shockwave caused by an aircraft or other object travelling faster than sound.

Sonic Boom may also refer to:

== Sonic the Hedgehog ==
- Sonic Boom (TV series), a 2014 animated TV series based on the Sonic the Hedgehog video game franchise
  - Sonic Boom: Rise of Lyric, a 2014 video game for the Wii U
  - Sonic Boom: Shattered Crystal, a 2014 video game for the Nintendo 3DS
  - Sonic Boom: Fire & Ice, a 2016 sequel to Shattered Crystal for the 3DS
- Sonic the Hedgehog Boom: The Music from Sonic CD and Sonic Spinball, a 1994 video game soundtrack album
- "Sonic Boom", the theme tune in the American release of the 1993 video game Sonic the Hedgehog CD

== Music ==
- Sonic Boom (Kiss album), a 2009 album by hard rock-band Kiss
- Sonic Boom (Lee Morgan album), a 1979 album by jazz trumpeter Lee Morgan
- "Sonic Boom" (song), a 2021 single by Lead
- "Sonic Boom", a song by Roy Woods, from the album Waking at Dawn
- "Sonic Boom", a song by the rock band Gear Daddies from their 1990 album Billy's Live Bait
- Sonic Boom Six, a UK rock band
- Peter Kember, a British musician more commonly known as Sonic Boom
- Sonic Boom, a 2012 album by pianist Uri Caine
- Sonic Boom Records, an independent record store in Seattle, Washington

== Other ==
- Sonic Boom (1987 video game), a scrolling shooter released for various platforms
- Sonic Boom, an attack move by Guile from the Street Fighter franchise
- Sonic Boom, a music store and frequent meeting place for characters of the TV series Austin & Ally
- Sonic Boom, a playable griffin character in the Skylanders video game franchise
