= DCI =

DCI may be an abbreviation for:

== Technology ==
- D-chiro-inositol, an isomer of inositol
- Data, context and interaction, an architectural pattern in computer software development
- Data center interconnect, a connection between data centers
- Digitally controlled impedance, a control function in FPGAs
- Display Control Interface, a computer graphics device driver standard developed using code from San Francisco Canyon Company
- Ductile cast iron, or ductile iron, a more flexible type of cast iron
- dCi (direct Common-rail Injection), Renault/Nissan's common rail fuel injection technology for diesel engines

== Businesses ==
- Digital Cinema Initiatives, a consortium to establish a specification for a standard digital cinema architecture
- Discovery Communications, an American global media and entertainment company
- Dynamic Cassette International, a Boston, Lincolnshire, UK company that produces products under the Jet Tec brand name
- DCI Cheese Company
- Dolphin Capital Investors, a real estate investment company
- Diners Club International, a global charge card
- Défense Conseil International, a French international services company in the field of defense and security

== Organizations ==
- Duelists' Convocation International, former name of Wizards Play Network, the tournament sanctioning body for various games including Magic: The Gathering
- Defence for Children International, a children's rights organization
- Dental Council of India, an organisation regulating dental education
- Dialysis Clinic, Inc, a nonprofit medical organization
- Drum Corps International, the nonprofit organization governing modern junior drum and bugle corps
- DCI Global Partnerships, a Christian charity organization
- Distressed Children & Infants International, a nonprofit organization
- Directorate of Criminal Investigations, a department within the Kenya Police

== Other ==
- Dade Correctional Institution, a prison in Florida
- Development Cooperation Instrument, a financial construct of the European Union
- Director of Central Intelligence, formerly the head of the U.S. Intelligence Community and Central Intelligence Agency
- Detective chief inspector, a police rank in the United Kingdom
- Decompression illness, brought on by rapid decompression
- Defence Capabilities Initiative, a 1999 NATO plan to ensure the effectiveness of multinational operations
- DCI, the number 601 in Roman numerals
- District of Columbia International School, a charter school in the District of Columbia
