= Zip World =

Outdoor adventure company based in Wales

- Zip wire launching point, Penrhyn Quarry
- Type: Private limited
- Industry: Outdoor amusement parks
- Predecessor: Tree Top Adventure
- Founded: 1 March 2013
- Headquarters: Denbigh Street, Llanrwst, Wales, LL26 0LL
- Number of locations: 4 (2022)
- Area served: United Kingdom
- Key people: Sean Taylor (owner)
- Owner: Dolphin Capital (majority)
- Website: zipworld.co.uk

Zip World is a Welsh outdoor adventure activity company based in Llanrwst, Wales, United Kingdom. The company operates four sites in Wales, primarily focused on zip lines and outdoor adventure activity courses. Since 2025, it is majority owned by Dolphin Capital.

== History ==
Passenger on a zip line at the original Zip World, Penrhyn Quarry

Zip World was created by Sean Taylor, an ex-Royal Marines commando from the Conwy Valley, based on his military experiences using zip lines and sky-diving. Taylor focused on converting heritage industrial sites into adventure playgrounds, making North Wales into an important adventure activity centre in Europe. Taylor launched 'Treetop Adventures' in 2007 (now Zip World Fforest).

Zip World was launched on the 1 March 2013 with 8 staff, with the opening of Velocity at Penrhyn Quarry. In 2014, Titan and Bounce Below at Llechwedd Slate Caverns opened, followed by Caverns at the same location in 2015. Zip World Fforest, a redevelopment of Treetop Adventures, opened in 2016.

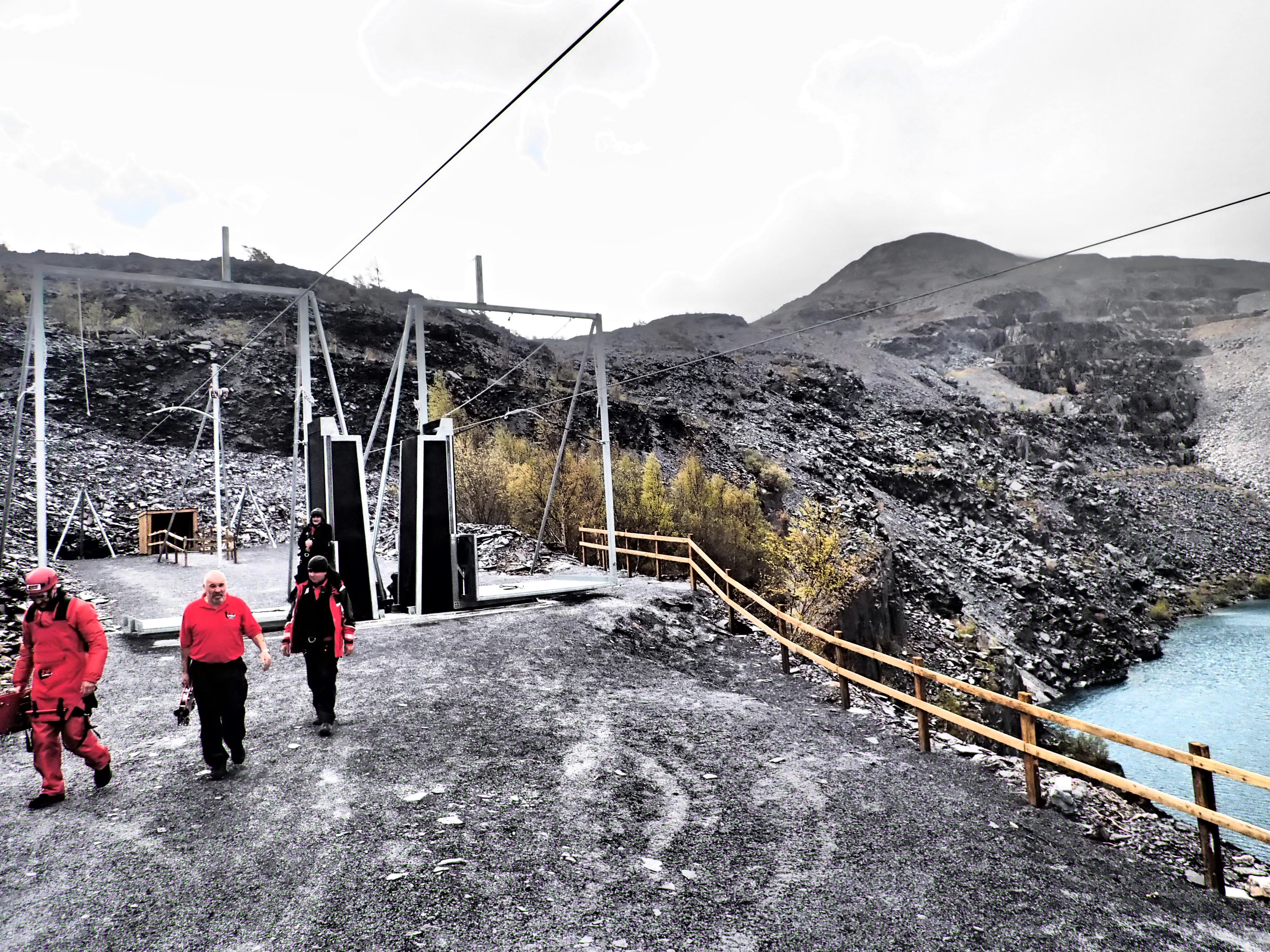
Penrhyn Quarry

In August 2017, it became sponsors of Eirias Stadium in Colwyn Bay, branding it as Stadiwm Zip World, which was retained as the brand name until a new sponsor took over in June 2022.

In 2021, the company had 250 staff, with up to 3,500 visitors per day during the peak holiday periods. The company stated it was set to report a turnover of £10 million for 2021, with a profit of £5.5 million.

The company is said to be valued at almost £100 million by September 2022, and has ambitions to expand further, but remaining based in Wales and being regarded as a Welsh company. The company bought out a business operating in the Lake District and Manchester and is looking to the accommodation and sustainable transport sectors, while considering a rebrand by the end of 2022, potentially "ZW" to address their increasingly non-Zip line business.

In January 2025, it was majority sold to Dolphin Capital, with Taylor retaining a minority stake. The deal was valued at £100 million.

== Sites ==
Zip World operates four sites, three in North Wales and one in South Wales. Three northern sites are in close proximity to each other and comprises sites at Penrhyn quarry, Llechwedd Slate Caverns, and Betws-y-Coed (Fforest). It also operates the Zip World Tower in Rhondda Cynon Taf in south Wales. Zip World was scheduled to open the Skyflyer airship in Rhyl, north Wales in July, then August 2022, however the launch was postponed to early 2023 due to bad weather and engineering issues.

=== Penrhyn Quarry ===
Zip line at Penrhyn Quarry

Zip World Penrhyn Quarry is home to Velocity 2, the world's fastest and Europe's longest zip line. The four parallel lines stretch nearly 1 mile (1.6 km) across the quarry and 500 feet (150 m) above its lake, reaching speeds of over 100 miles per hour (160 km/h).

=== Llechwedd ===
Zip World Llechwedd Adventures, based around the Llechwedd slate mines, offers a Deep Mine Tour of the caverns, an underground trampoline park known as Bounce Below, the world's largest underground zip wire course, and multiple stand-alone zip lines termed "Titan", including Europe's first four-person zip line as well as a shorter 98 feet (30 m) zip line. The site opened the world's first underground golf course in the site's caverns in 2022.

=== Betws-y-Coed ===
Zip World Betws-y-Coed ropes course

Zip World Betws-y-Coed (Fforest) houses the UK's only alpine coaster, Europe's largest net walkway 60 feet (18 m) above the ground, and Zip Safari 2, a hanging zip-line and obstacle course 60 feet (18 m) above ground. It also houses, a 'Tree Hoppers' beginner assault course, the 100 feet (30 m) Plummet 2 tandem drop high tower, Europe's highest giant swing Skyride 2, and a 1 kilometre (0.62 mi) Fforest Coaster through woodlands.

=== Tower Colliery ===
Zip World Tower Colliery entrance

Zip World Tower Colliery, near Aberdare in the Rhigos mountain range in South Wales, is situated at the former Tower Colliery coal mining site, housing Phoenix and Tower Flyer.

=== Proposed sites ===
The company was initially granted permission to set up a 450-foot (140 m) attraction between St John's Beacon and the Liverpool Central Library in 2020, but was scrapped following local opposition.

In 2021, Taylor also announced his ambitions to search for new sites, including one in Scotland, in three national parks in England, and one south of Dublin in Ireland. Although Taylor stated his preference for 8–10 sites in the UK, across key UK regions. Devon was stated at the time as being a leading contender for the company's next site and the first site outside Wales.

Potential sites for Zip World in the Lake District and Manchester have been proposed following the company's purchase of a business with operations in those locations in 2022, bringing the company's site count to potentially seven. In July 2022, a local partnership for the Lake District National Park, opened a survey over potential plans by Burlington Stone, proposing partnering with Zip World, for an "adventure tourism experience" at Elterwater quarry, Langdale, in the Lake District. 30,000 people signed an E-petition against the proposal.

In 2025, it plans to open a site at the Queen Elizabeth Olympic Park in London and the Elterwater site.
