= Richard Jacques =

English composer (born 1973)

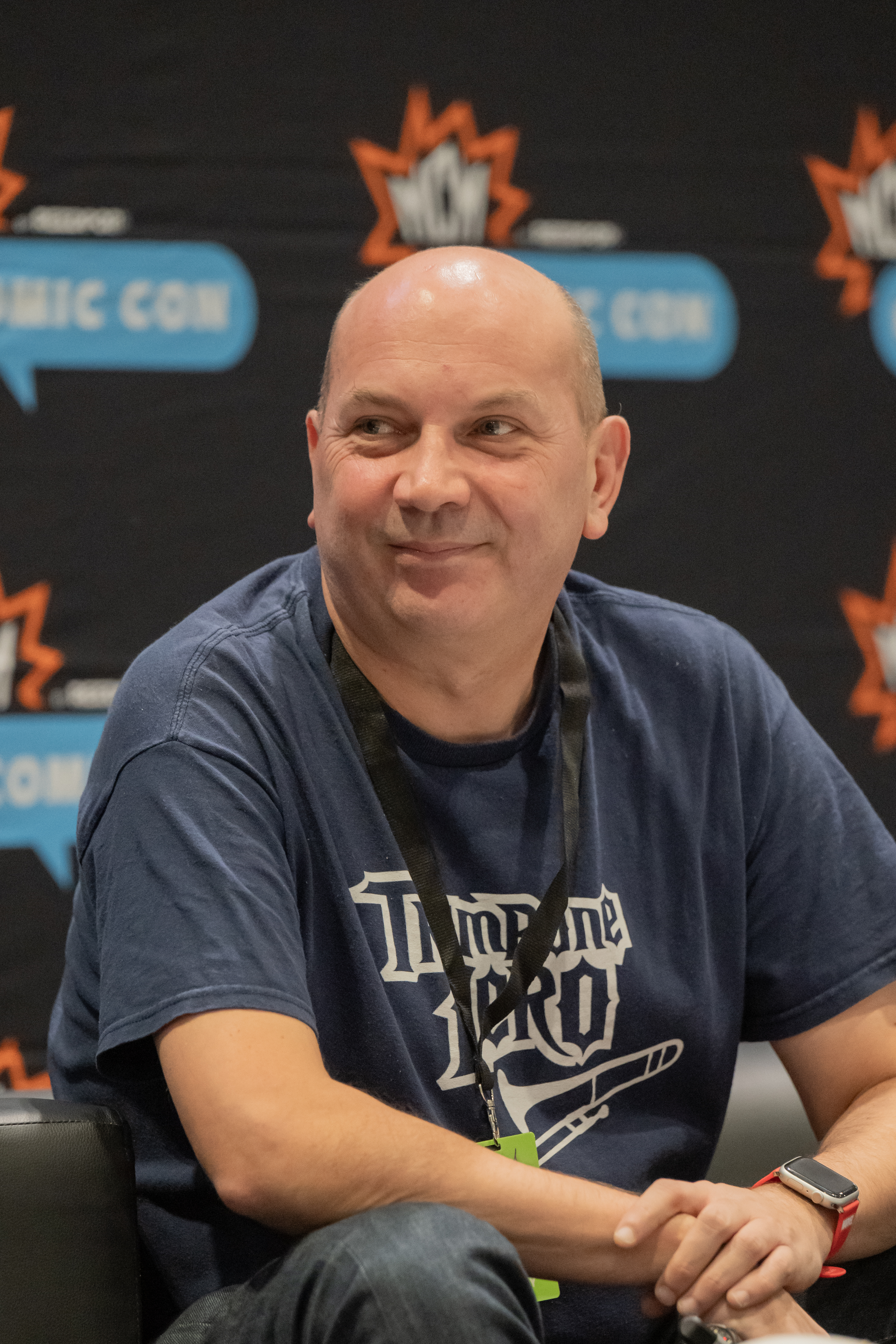
- At MCM London Comic Con, 24 October 2025

Background information
- Born: Richard Adrian Jacques; 1973 (age 52–53)
- Genres: Video game music; jazz; orchestral; pop; film score; electronica; EDM
- Occupations: Composer; musician
- Years active: 1994–present
- Labels: Sumthing Else Music Works; West One Music

Richard Adrian Jacques (/dʒeɪks/; born 1973) is an English composer of film, television and video game music. He is best known for his scores for games such as Sonic R, Headhunter, Jet Set Radio Future, Mass Effect, James Bond 007: Blood Stone, LittleBigPlanet 2, and Guardians of the Galaxy.

== Early life ==
Jacques was interested in composing music from an early age. He was awarded a scholarship to attend the Royal Academy of Music in London, studying trombone and piano, and showed a keen interest in composition in multiple styles including orchestral, jazz and popular music genres. He then attended Wells Cathedral School aged 16 as a Specialist Musician, where he also took up Percussion. In 1994 Jacques graduated with a Bachelor of Arts degree in music from Colchester Institute / University of Essex. He was immediately hired as an in-house composer at Sega Europe.

== Career ==
At Sega Europe, Jacques began by composing soundtracks for a number of Sega Saturn, Dreamcast, and Xbox games such as Daytona CCE, Sonic R, Sonic 3D Blast, Jet Set Radio, Metropolis Street Racer and Jet Set Radio Future.

Jacques's most accomplished work at Sega, 2001's Headhunter, was the first video game soundtrack to be recorded with A-list musicians at Abbey Road Studios' Studio One. The soundtrack was well received, and won multiple awards including Game Audio Network Guild 'Recognition Award', and was performed at the first Symphonic Game Music Concert at The Gewandhaus in Leipzig and Video Games Live events including the inaugural concert at the Hollywood Bowl in 2005. Jacques left Sega Europe shortly after Jet Set Radio Future's release and became a freelance composer, continuing his relationship with Sega by scoring Headhunter Redemption in 2004.

Jacques went on to compose the BAFTA and Ivor Novello nominated original music for James Bond 007: Blood Stone. The score received top honours for "Best Original Composition" from the Music and Sound Awards 2012. After this, Jacques composed the music for the Alice in Wonderland game, for Disney in 2010, and LittleBigPlanet 2 for Sony in 2011.

Soon after, Richard opened a new studio in central London called AUDISSI, where he writes original music for new advertising, television, video games, and other visual media projects. This included music for TV game-shows such as Don't Scare the Hare, Prize Island, Fifteen to One, Catchphrase, The Getaway Car, Go for It, Don't Ask Me Ask Britain and Y Siambr.

In 2018, Jacques was presented with the Lifetime Achievement award from the Game Audio Network Guild.

In 2022, his score to Marvel's Guardians of the Galaxy won him the Best Original Video Game Score Ivor Novello Award.

== Works ==
=== Video games ===
Year	Title	Note(s)
1995	Darxide	Music with Adam Salkeld
1995	F1 Challenge	Music with Adam Salkeld; European version
1996	Daytona USA: Championship Circuit Edition	Music with Kenichi Tokoi, Jun Senoue, and Tomonori Sawada
1996	Shinobi X (European version)	Music
1996	Sonic 3D Blast (Sega Saturn version)	Music
1997	Sonic R	Music
1997	Sega Worldwide Soccer '98	Music
2000	Jet Set Radio	Music with Hideki Naganuma and others
2000	Metropolis Street Racer	Music
2001	Headhunter	Music
2002	Jet Set Radio Future	Music with Hideki Naganuma and others
2002	Total Immersion Racing	Music
2003	Headhunter Redemption	Music
2004	OutRun 2	Arrangements
2004	EyeToy: Play 2	Music
2005	Starship Troopers	Music
2005	Pursuit Force	Music
2005	Galidor: Defenders of the Outer Dimension	Music
2005	EyeToy: Play 3	Music with Matt Coldrick
2006	Sega Rally 2006	Music with several others
2006	OutRun 2006	Arrangements
2007	Mass Effect	Music with Jack Wall, Sam Hulick and David Kates
2007	Pursuit Force: Extreme Justice	Music with Jeff Tymoschuk
2007	Battlestations: Midway	Music
2008	Conflict: Denied Ops	Music
2008	Sega Superstars Tennis	Music
2008	Hasbro Family Game Night	Music
2008	You're in the Movies	Music
2008	Wacky Races: Crash & Dash	Music
2008	Sonic Chronicles: The Dark Brotherhood	Music with Steven Sim
2008	The Club	Music with Chris Chudley and Jesper Kyd
2009	Sonic and the Black Knight	Music with several others
2009	Battlestations: Pacific	Music with David Kates
2010	Alice in Wonderland: An Adventure Beyond the Mirror	Music with Wu Songming
2010	Fluidity	Music with Allister Brimble and Anthony Putson
2010	Alice in Wonderland	Music
2010	James Bond 007: Blood Stone	Music
2010	Sonic Free Riders	Arrangements
2011	Forza Motorsport 4	Music with several others
2011	Sonic Generations	Music with several others
2011	Fate of the World	Music
2011	LittleBigPlanet 2	Music
2012	LittleBigPlanet: The Muppets Premium Level Kit	Music
2012	LittleBigPlanet PS Vita	Music
2012	LittleBigPlanet Karting	Music
2012	Sonic & All-Stars Racing Transformed	Music
2013	Alice in Wonderland: A New Champion	Music
2013	Powerstar Golf	Music
2014	Sonic Boom: Rise of Lyric	Music
2014	Sonic Boom: Shattered Crystal	Music
2016	Sonic Boom: Fire & Ice	Music
2017	Knowledge is Power	Music with several others
2017	Sonic Forces	Recording engineer
2019	Team Sonic Racing	Music with several others
2021	Marvel's Guardians of the Galaxy	Music
2022	Overwatch 2	Music with several others
2024	Shadow Generations	Music with several others
2026	Denshattack!	Music with several others

=== Film and TV ===
Year	Title	Notes
2011	Don't Scare the Hare	TV series
2013	Wright vs. Wrong	Short
2013	Beat the Pack	TV series
2013	Prize Island	TV series
2013	Fifteen to One	TV series
2013	Catchphrase	TV series
2014	Quest: A Tall Tale	Film
2015	If You Give a Mouse a Cookie	TV series
2016	The Getaway Car	TV series
2016	Go for It	TV series
2017	Don't Ask Me Ask Britain	TV series
2019	Y Siambr	TV series
