= Knowledge is Power (disambiguation) =

The phrase "scientia potentia est" is a Latin aphorism meaning "knowledge is power"

Knowledge is Power or Scientia Potentia Est may also refer to:

- Knowledge is Power (video game)
- Znanie — Sila, a Russian popular science magazine
- Knowledge is Power Program, open-enrollment college-preparatory public charter schools in the United States
- "Scientia Potentia Est" (The Crown), a 2016 television episode
- "Knowledge Is Power" (The Fresh Prince of Bel-Air), a 1990 television episode
- Power-knowledge, a concept in critical theory introduced by the work of Michel Foucault
