= Mario & Sonic at the Sochi 2014 Olympic Winter Games =

2013 video game

- North American box art
- Developers: Sega; Marvelous AQL
- Publisher: Nintendo
- Directors: Hiroshi Miyamoto; Takamichi Nitta
- Producers: Nobuya Ohashi; Eigo Kasahara; Takehiro Ishida; Toyokazu Nonaka
- Designer: Naohiro Hirao
- Programmer: Mitsuru Takahashi
- Artist: Hiroshi Kanazawa
- Composer: Sega Digital Studio: Tadashi Kinukawa Hideaki Kobayashi Naofumi Hataya Chihiro Aoki Jun Senoue Mitsuharu Fukuyama Yuri Fukuda Yutaka Minobe Ken Inaoka
- Series: Mario & Sonic
- Platform: Wii U
- Release: EU: November 8, 2013; AU: November 9, 2013; NA: November 15, 2013; JP: December 5, 2013
- Genres: Sports, party
- Modes: Single-player, multiplayer

Mario & Sonic at the Sochi 2014 Olympic Winter Games (Note: Japanese: マリオ&(アンド)ソニック AT(アット) ソチオリンピック, Hepburn: Mario ando Sonikku atto Sochi Orinpikku; lit. 'Mario & Sonic at the Sochi Olympics', stylized as Mario & Sonic at the Olympic Winter Games: Sochi 2014) is a 2013 crossover sports video game developed by Sega and Marvelous AQL and published by Nintendo for the Wii U. It is the fourth game in the Mario & Sonic series, the first to be released exclusively on the Wii U, the last Mario & Sonic Winter Olympic installment to date and is the official video game for the 2014 Winter Olympics that were held in Sochi.

It is the first title in the series to feature an online multiplayer mode, and the first to be published by Nintendo globally, as previous titles were published by Sega outside Japan, and unlike previous installments, the game was not released on a portable console (in this case the Nintendo 3DS). The game formed the second part (and the only one that Nintendo published) in Sega's exclusivity agreement with Nintendo after Sonic Lost World back in mid-October 2013, and was followed by Sonic Boom: Rise of Lyric and Sonic Boom: Shattered Crystal in November/December 2014.

The game received mixed reviews from critics who praised the visuals, multiplayer, and addition of online play, but criticised its controls and lack of innovation from previous games in the series. A fifth game in the series, Mario & Sonic at the Rio 2016 Olympic Games, was released for Wii U in 2016. Sochi is the second and final Mario & Sonic game based on the Winter Olympics.

== Gameplay ==
The players can only choose one of twenty characters that return from the previous two games and participate in a series of sixteen Olympic events. Events are controlled either using the Wii Remote (Plus), Nunchuks, or the Wii U GamePad, with some events, such as the biathlon, utilizing both control methods, for the Wii U version. Along with returning events, such as skiing, bobsledding and curling, new events include figure skating pairs and snowboarding slope style. Like in the previous games, players can also participate in one of eight fictional Dream Events, including a new mixed event in which cases can be simultaneously played with snowboarding, skiing, and bobsledding players. These events are played in places from the Mario and Sonic franchises. A new mode addition to this game is the Action & Answer Tour, where players answer questions to score points while competing in various events hosted by Orbot and Cubot from Sonic Colors and Sonic Lost World.

== Reception ==
Reception

Aggregate score
| Aggregator | Score |
|---|---|
| Metacritic | 55/100 |

Review scores
| Publication | Score |
|---|---|
| Destructoid | 6/10 |
| GameSpot | 5/10 |
| GamesRadar+ | 3.5/5 |
| IGN | 4.5/10 |
| Nintendo Life | 6/10 |
| Nintendo World Report | 7/10 |
| Polygon | 6/10 |
| The Guardian | 3/5 |

Mario & Sonic at the Sochi 2014 Olympic Winter Games received generally mixed reviews, with most critics praising the visuals, multiplayer, and the online mode, but panning the game's similarity to previous Mario & Sonic series games and motion controls. It has an aggregate score of 55/100 at Metacritic.

Gaz Plant of Nintendo Life gave the game 6 out of 10, summarising that it "...feels like a minor progression, but not a huge leap you might be expecting. Taking a lot of its cues from the 2010 game, and ignoring the rapid-fire party experience of 2012, this latest edition hits some of the right buttons, but they're the same unremarkable buttons that were hit four years ago. The inclusion of online is certainly welcome, but too limited, while the inventive TV idea used on the GamePad is never taken far enough. But that said, with a group of friends, there's still a lot of fun to be had here; it's just hard to shake that feeling that you've done it all before."

Digital Spy's Liam Martin scored the game 3 out of 5, praising the game's visuals, multiplayer aspects and family-friendly fun but commented on the game's lack of "spark" and progression in the Mario & Sonic series, stating that "When the action is go and games are in full swing, the game is a flashy and fun mini-game compilation for all of the family. Despite some enjoyable multiplayer encounters, the game is lacking the sublime to go with the star power".

IGN's Scott Thompson gave the game 4.5 out of 10, praising the game's online multiplayer but panned the game's unresponsive motion controls; summarising that "[The game] has some good ideas but it's weighed down by bad motion controls".
