= Lara Jill Miller =

American actress (born 1967)

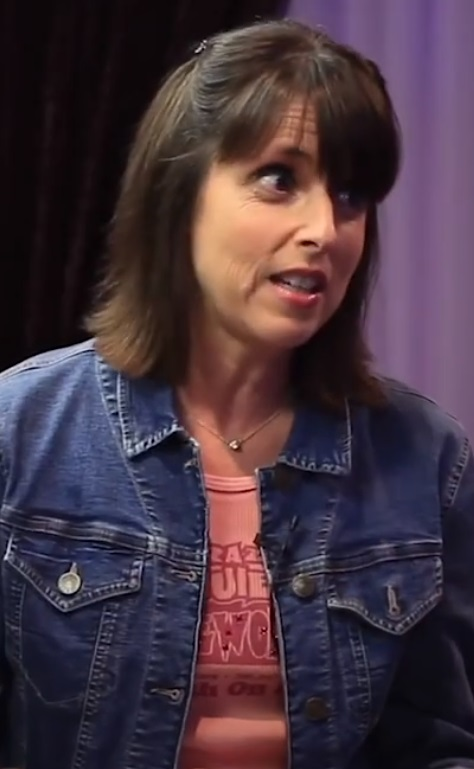
- Miller in 2015
- Born: April 20, 1967 (age 59); Allentown, Pennsylvania, U.S.
- Other name: Lara Miller
- Education: New York University (BA); Fordham University School of Law (JD)
- Occupation: Actress
- Years active: 1978–present

Lara Jill Miller (born April 20, 1967) is an American actress. She played Samantha "Sam" Kanisky in the 1980s sitcom Gimme a Break! and Kathy on The Amanda Show.

She voices the title characters in Clifford's Puppy Days, The Life and Times of Juniper Lee and Henry Hugglemonster, Haru in Beastars, Kari in Digimon, Widget in Wow! Wow! Wubbzy!, Lambie in Doc McStuffins, Fink in OK K.O.! Let's Be Heroes, Lisa Loud in The Loud House, Julie in Hi Hi Puffy AmiYumi, Libby Stein-Torres in The Ghost and Molly McGee, Izzie in SciGirls, Allie Renkins in Curious George, and Cat in If You Give a Mouse a Cookie.

== Early life and education ==
Miller was born on April 20, 1967, in Allentown, Pennsylvania, to Lois (née Noll) and Stanley Miller. Her parents were both Jewish. Her mother founded the talent agency Star Talent Management. Her father owned and operated a pajama factory. He was also well known for his participation in community theater, and he worked as an extra in the film Hairspray.

Miller first started acting at a local dinner theater, which she tried out for after seeing its auditions advertised in a local newspaper and asking her father what the word "audition" meant.

She graduated from Allentown's William Allen High School in 1985.

== Career ==
Miller's professional acting career began on Broadway, where she appeared as Amaryllis in a revival of The Music Man with Dick Van Dyke.

In 1981, after her appearance on Broadway, she joined the cast of Gimme a Break!, playing the role of the tomboyish Samantha "Sam" Kanisky opposite Nell Carter. When the series ended its six-year run on NBC in 1987, Miller attended New York University, where she played on the university's women's varsity tennis team and continued performing on stage nationally. Four years later, she received her J.D. degree from Fordham University School of Law, leaving graduation early to portray Peter Pan in a production at the Pennsylvania Youth Theater. She subsequently was admitted to practice law in New Jersey, New York, and her native Pennsylvania.

In 1999, Miller resumed her on-camera acting career with recurring roles on the Nickelodeon series The Amanda Show and All That and on General Hospital. She also began working in animated series, lending her voice to various characters, including Kari in Digimon (both the series and the feature film), Koko in Zatch Bell!, Alejo in Astro Boy, and Scheris Adjani in s-CRY-ed. Miller also provided the singing voice of Dorothy Gale in the National Public Radio adaptation of L. Frank Baum's The Wonderful Wizard of Oz, and the voices of the title characters on Cartoon Network's The Life and Times of Juniper Lee, Disney Junior's Henry Hugglemonster, and the PBS Kids Clifford's Puppy Days (a prequel to Clifford the Big Red Dog).

Miller appears in the recurring roles of Pookie, Wiki, and Tini on Disney Channel's Higglytown Heroes, Haruka of Daigunder, and the Nick Jr. series Wow! Wow! Wubbzy! as Widget; the PBS series Curious George as Allie and SciGirls as Izzie, and regular guest-starring roles on several other animated series.

For five seasons, she performed voice work on the Disney Channel/Disney Junior television series Doc McStuffins as the voice of Lambie, and on the Nickelodeon television series The Loud House as the voices of Lisa Loud, Liam Hunnicutt, Becky, Persephone, and Nurse Patti.

In 2020, she voice acted for two cartoons, the episode "All About Zee" in DC Super Hero Girls and the English dub for Beastars as Haru. From 2021 to 2024, she performed the role of Libby in the Disney production, The Ghost and Molly McGee.

== Filmography ==
=== Live action ===
List of acting performances in live-action television and film
Year	Title	Role	Notes	Source
1981–87	Gimme a Break!	Samantha "Sam" Kanisky	Main role	
1986	Touch and Go	Courtney		
1999–02	The Amanda Show	Kathy		
2000	Chicken Soup for the Soul	The Teacher	TV series	
2002	General Hospital	Kate Whittaker	Episode #1.9927	
2006	Shushybye	Snoozles, Dozie, and Zeez		
2009	iCarly	Mrs. Kravitz	Episode: "iFind Lewbert's Lost Love"	

=== Anime ===
List of dubbing performances in anime
Year	Title	Role	Notes	Source
1999	Digimon Adventure	Kari Kamiya		
2000	Digimon Adventure 02	Kari Kamiya		
2001	Digimon Tamers	Nami Asaji		
2002	Daigunder	Haruka		
2002	Argento Soma	Second Lt. Sue Harris		
2002–03	Great Teacher Onizuka	Anko's friend		
2003	.hack//Legend of the Twilight	Random Girl		
2003	S-CRY-ed	Scheris Adjani		
2004	Ghost in the Shell: Stand Alone Complex	Tachikoma	also in Ghost in the Shell: S.A.C. 2nd GIG (series 2)	
2004	Astro Boy	Alejo, Vivienne, C.J., Mimi, Nina	Sony Pictures TV / Kids' WB! / Cartoon Network /Toonami	
2004	Please Twins!	Karen Onodera		
2005	Planetes	Nono		
2005	Rave Master	Hole	Episode 2	
2005	Naruto	Matsuri		
2005–07	Zatch Bell!	Koko		
2007	Blood+	Min, Lulu, Javier		
2008	Lucky ☆ Star	Misao Kusakabe		
2008	Strait Jacket	Kapelteta Fernandez		
2010	Nodame Cantabile	Yuiko Miyoshi		
2020–2026	Beastars	Haru		

=== Animation ===
List of voice performances in animation
Year	Title	Role	Note's	Notes	Source
2001–13	Totally Spies!	Ariel	Episode: W.O.W.		
2002	Static Shock	Teen Girl #2	Episode: "Power Play"		
2002	Rocket Power	Girl #1, Kid #1	Episode: "Beach Boyz and a Girl/X-treme Ideas"		
2003–06	Clifford's Puppy Days	Clifford			
2004	The Grim Adventures of Billy & Mandy	Girl/Kid C	Episode: "Which Came First?/Substitute Teacher"		
2004	Megas XLR	Little Girl, Kelly			
2004	All Grown Up!	Olivia			
2004–08	Higglytown Heroes	Pookie, Wiki, Tini			
2005–07	The Life and Times of Juniper Lee	Juniper Lee			
2006	Hi Hi Puffy AmiYumi	Julie Hinikawa	Episode: "Julie AmiYumi"		
2006	Shorty McShorts' Shorts	April	Episode: "My Mom Married a Yeti"		
2006–10	Wow! Wow! Wubbzy!	Widget, Huggy, Old Lady Zamboni			
2009–22	Curious George	Allie			
2010–23	SciGirls	Izzie			
2011–12	Winx Club	Chatta, Tune, Livy	Special 4, season 3–4 Atlas Oceanic version		
2011–16	Poppy Cat	Mother Bumblebird			
2012–20	Doc McStuffins	Lambie, additional voices			
2013–15	Henry Hugglemonster	Henry Hugglemonster			
2015–21	If You Give a Mouse a Cookie	Cat			
2016–present	The Loud House	Lisa Loud, additional voices			
2017	Vampirina	Matilda	Episode: "The Monster Snore"		
2017–19	OK K.O.! Let's Be Heroes	Fink, Cantalop, Truffle, Koala Princess			
2018	Bunnicula	Lil Capone	Episode: "Haunted Dog House"		
2020	DC Super Hero Girls	Casey Krinsky	Episode: "#AllAboutZee"		
2020, 2022	The Casagrandes	Lisa Loud	2 episodes		
2021–23	Looney Tunes Cartoons	Petunia Pig			
2021–24	The Ghost and Molly McGee	Libby Stein-Torres			

=== Film ===
List of voice performances in direct-to-video and television films
Year	Title	Role	Source
2005	Digimon: Revenge of Diaboromon	Kari Kamiya	
2008	Wubbzy's Big Movie!	Widget, Huggy, Old Lady Zamboni	
2013	Curious George Swings Into Spring	Allie, Balloonist	
2013	Curious George: A Halloween Boo Fest	Allie	
2021	The Loud House Movie	Lisa Loud, 1600's Lisa	
2022	Trick or Treat Scooby-Doo!	Prisoner Costume Teen, Superhero Boy, Musketeer 3	
2024	No Time to Spy: A Loud House Movie	Lisa Loud	
2024	Digimon Adventure	Kari Kamiya	
2024	Digimon Adventure: Our War Game!	Kari Kamiya	
2024	Digimon Adventure 02: Digimon Hurricane Touchdown!! / Transcendent Evolution! The Golden Digimentals	Kari Kamiya	
2025	A Loud House Christmas Movie: Naughty or Nice	Lisa Loud	

List of voice performances in feature films
Year	Title	Role	Source
2000	Digimon: The Movie	Kari, Young Kari	
2011	Puss in Boots	Additional voices	

=== Video games ===
List of voice performances in video games
Year	Title	Role	Notes	Source
1998	Baldur's Gate	Girl		
1999	EverQuest	Various characters		
2000	Adiboo: Discover series	Adiboo		
2001	Diablo II: Lord of Destruction	Assassin		
2002	Digimon Rumble Arena	Kari		
2002	Warcraft III: Reign of Chaos	Jaina Proudmoore		
2002	Nickelodeon Party Blast	Jimmy Neutron		
2003	Warcraft III: The Frozen Throne	Jaina Proudmoore		
2003	Tak and the Power of Juju	Dinky Juju		
2004	Tak 2: The Staff of Dreams	Dinky Juju		
2004	EverQuest II	Various characters		
2005	Tak: The Great Juju Challenge	Dinky Juju		
2005	Psychonauts	Milka Phage		
2006	Barnyard	Zak Boy, various		
2007	Nicktoons: Attack of the Toybots	Bustup Ballerina, Mr. Huggles, Springy Rabbit		
2008	de Blob	Comrade Black, Zip, Graydians		
2009	FusionFall	Juniper Lee		
2010	White Knight Chronicles	Various		
2011	de Blob 2	Comrade Black, Papa Blanc, Inkies		
2011	Once Upon a Monster	Shelby		
2016	World of Warcraft: Legion	Korine		
2017	Kingdom Hearts HD 2.8 Final Chapter Prologue	Chirithy		
2019	Kingdom Hearts III	Chirithy		
2020	Kingdom Hearts III Re:Mind	Chirithy		
2020	Legends of Runeterra	Crackshot Corsair, Ava Achiever		
2020	Kingdom Hearts: Melody of Memory	Chirithy		
2023	Arknights	Vermeil		

== Personal life ==
In 2006, Miller's mother was diagnosed with frontotemporal dementia, a progressive brain disease, which forced her to close her talent agency; Miller has since helped spread awareness of the disease.
