= Jeff Lander =

American video game programmer

- Occupation: Video game developer
- Years active: 1996–present
- Employers: Darwin 3D (1996–present); Luxoflux (2002–2006); Electronic Arts (2006–2009); Big Red Button Entertainment (2009–present)
- Awards: IGDA Award for Community Contribution (2002)

Jeff Lander is an American video game programmer. He creates real-time 3D graphics at Darwin 3D, a game technology specialist company. He has written several articles on 3D graphics for Gamasutra and Game Developers Conference. In 2002, he received the IGDA Award for Community Contribution at the Game Developers Choice Awards.

Lander co-founded the Game Tech conference event with Chris Hecker, and, in 2004, co-designed it with Jonathan Blow.

In 2009, Jeff Lander and Bob Rafei founded Big Red Button Entertainment, a video game development studio. Lander is the studio's technical director, and served in this role for their debut game, Sonic Boom: Rise of Lyric.

== Games ==
Year of release	Game	Role	Developer	Publisher
1997	Dark Reign: The Future of War	Additional programming	Auran Development	Activision
2001	Supercar Street Challenge	Lead Programmer	Exakt Entertainment	Activision
2001	Anachronox	Programmer	Ion Storm	Eidos Interactive
2003	True Crime: Streets of LA	Programming/Technology	Luxoflux	Activision
2004	Shrek 2	Engine/Technology	Luxoflux	Activision
2005	True Crime: New York City	Player Programming Lead	Luxoflux	Activision
2014	Sonic Boom: Rise of Lyric	Programmer	Big Red Button Entertainment	Sega
