= Y Siambr (TV series) =

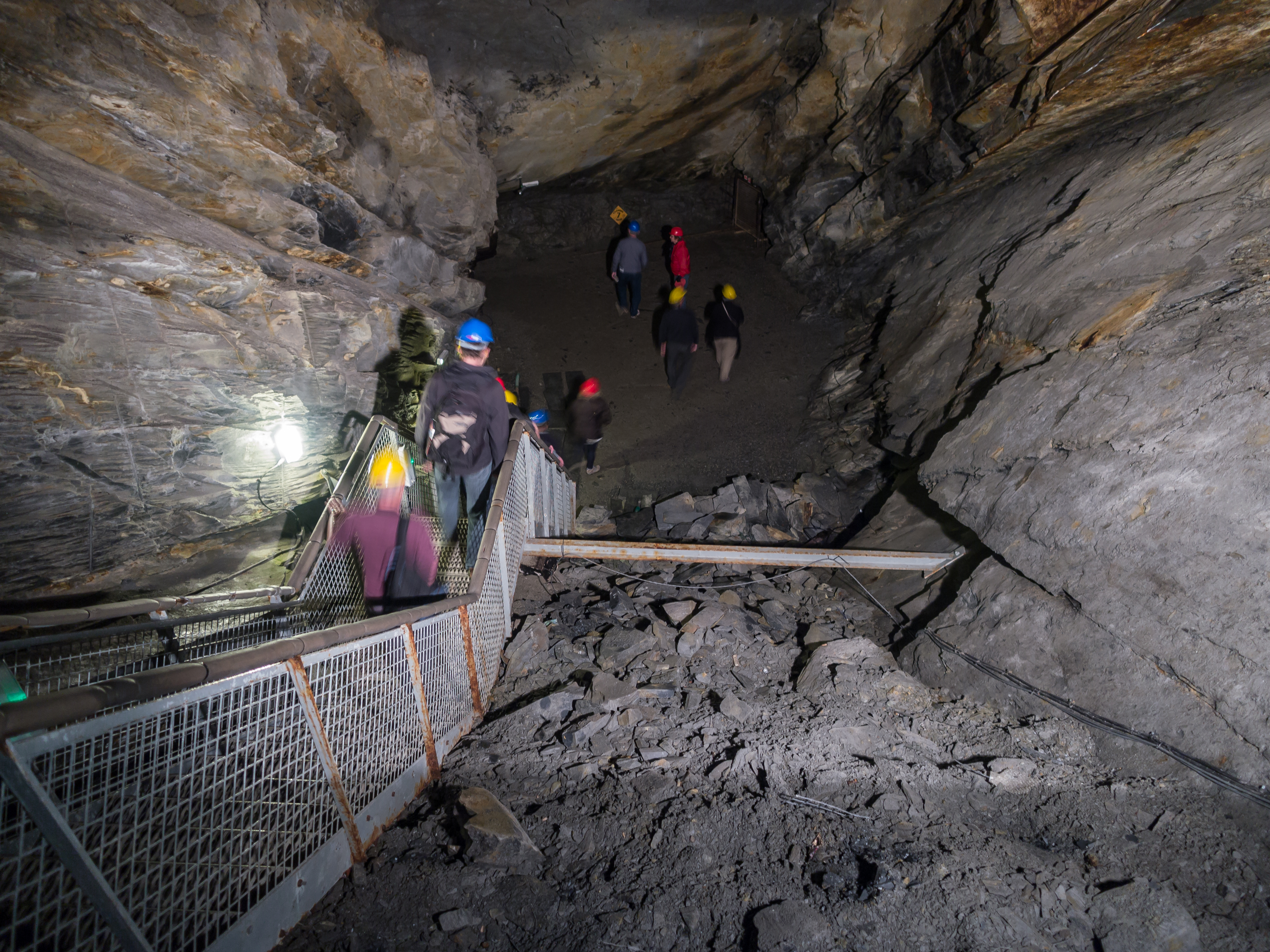
- Inside Llechwedd Slate Caverns
- Genre: Game show
- Presented by: Aeron Pughe
- Voices of: Dylan Ebenezer
- Theme music composer: Marc Sylvan; Richard Jacques
- Country of origin: Wales, United Kingdom
- Original language: Welsh
- No. of series: 1
- No. of episodes: 6

Production
- Production locations: Bounce Below, Llechwedd Slate Caverns
- Running time: 60 minutes (inc. adverts)
- Production company: Boom Cymru

Original release
- Network: S4C
- Release: 7 March – 11 April 2019

Y Siambr (Welsh pronunciation: [ə ʃambr], meaning The Chamber) is a television game show, first broadcast in 2019 on the Welsh language channel S4C. It is claimed to be the first underground game show, filmed entirely in the Llechwedd Slate Caverns of Blaenau Ffestiniog, North Wales.

== Format ==
The programmes are presented by Aeron Pughe (who said he was "shaking with fear" when he first saw the location). In each programme two teams of three players compete to win challenges on the four levels of caverns, via netted cages and zip wires suspended inside the caves. Examples of the challenges include:

- Members of the opposing teams may be attached to one another with a bungee rope. Each has to try to clear their coloured balls from the trampoline floor of the set.
- A member from each team racing from room to room to strike illuminated buttons. The quickest to strike their coloured button on each occasion gives their remaining team members a few seconds of screen time to solve a puzzle.
- The entire team climb along the wall of the cavern 150 feet above the floor of the cave. The team that reaches and holds down two groups of six illuminated buttons simultaneously for five seconds, in the fastest time, wins the round.
- Round four sees two members of each team trying to be first to answer general knowledge questions. The third member of the team can then use zip lines inside the cavern to slide down to the next level. The first team member to reach the bottom wins the game for their team. The losers leave the game.

After reaching the bottom of the cave, the winning team has to solve puzzles to crack a code, to be able to escape to the daylight.

== Production ==
The programme is produced by Boom Cymru and the idea was first conceived after one of the executive producers and his family visited Bounce Below's deep cave trampoline centre, at the Llechwedd Slate Caverns in Blaenau Ffestiniog. The concept took two years to come to fruition.

Each level of the caverns was rigged with equipment and cameras. With mainly unstable trampoline floors, camera crew were required to hang from the ceilings to get a steady footage.

The slate caverns were closed from 18 January 2019, with the production team and contestants filming the whole series from 25 to 29 January.
