= Shushybye =

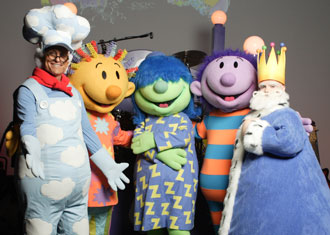
- From left to right: The stars of Shushybye; Conductor McCloud, Dozie, Zeez, Snoozles, The Shushybye King
- Created by: Steve Syatt
- Voices of: Lara Jill Miller; Nika Futterman; John Jennings
- Narrated by: Kenny Curtis
- Country of origin: United States

Production
- Production company: The Shushybye Company

Original release
- Network: BabyFirstTV

Shushybye is an original dream-themed entertainment brand for preschoolers/toddlers launched in June 2006, encompassing a national television series on BabyFirst, a series of bedtime storybooks from St. Martin's Press, toys, plush dolls, music CDs, DVDs and sleepwear. New episodes of Shushybye were planned to air on Babyfirst TV in January 2013 with a new group of characters known as the Dreamsters joining the cast.

== Premise ==
Shushybye is a land centered on dreams, ones especially-made for children by the Shushies who live in villages such as Nap Valley, Snore Shore, and Slumber Heights. Children make a Dream Wish before they go to sleep. The Shushies say "wondrous" over and over, make all their dreams, then place them in Dream Boxes. Conductor McCloud then calls everything "wondrous", puts the Dream Boxes onto the Shushybye Train, and transports them to children as they fall asleep on time. After making dreams, the Shushies gather in Pillow Park for the nightly Shushybye Dance, where they move and groove to the music of the Shushybyes, and take turns saying "wondrous".

Shushybye creator-songwriter Steve Syatt wanted to compose and produce music that adults would enjoy while helping introduce their children to such popular musical genres as rock 'n roll, blues, jazz, rhythm & blues, Latin, and country. As a result, the Shushybyes explore many diverse music forms that have been hailed by major parenting media as contemporary lullaby classics.

== Awards and recognition ==
The Dove Foundation awarded Shushybye five stars and recommends it as a "fantastic, colorful, foot-tapping music video for little ones and their families."

== Cast ==
- Lara Jill Miller - voices of Snoozles, Dozie, Zeez (Shushies)
- Nika Futterman - voices of PJ, Starbright, Snore (Dreamsters)
- John Jennings - voice of Captain John Yawn
- Michael North - lead singer for the Shushybye Dream Band
- Kenny Curtis - narrator
- Lindley Mayer - Snoozles
- Carly Peeters - Dozie and Nightlight
- Emily Cordic - Zeez
- Marisa Dorchock - Dozie
