= The Getaway Car =

- Genre: Game show
- Presented by: Dermot O'Leary
- Starring: The Stig
- Composers: Richard Jacques; Marc Sylvan
- Country of origin: United Kingdom
- No. of series: 1
- No. of episodes: 12

Production
- Production locations: Cape Town, South Africa
- Running time: 50 minutes

Original release
- Network: BBC One
- Release: 16 January – 3 September 2016

The Getaway Car is a British game show that has aired on BBC One from 16 January to 3 September 2016. It is hosted by Dermot O'Leary and is themed around motoring; it also features the character The Stig from the BBC car show Top Gear, as well as supporting characters the Red Stig and Blue Stig, described as The Stig's adolescent nephews.

== History ==
The show's initial commission was for twelve hour-long episodes and made by Charlotte Moore, the controller for BBC One and Mark Linsey, the controller of entertainment commissioning. It was executive produced by Andy Rowe, series produced by Emma Taylor and its head of format, Clare Pizey, oversaw proceedings. This initial series is hosted by Dermot O'Leary, with assistance from the anonymous racing driver character The Stig, who had previously featured on BBC Two's motoring show Top Gear.

== Format ==
=== Overview ===
In each episode, five teams of two contestants each compete in three rounds of car based competition, which reduces the field down to a final couple, who in the final round try to win as much money as possible by racing the Getaway Car against The Stig. The contest is pitched as much as a test of the relationship of the couple as it is of their driving ability.

Speaking on 8 January 2016 episode of the BBC's The One Show, O'Leary described the show as "Total Wipeout behind the wheel of a car meets Gogglebox - in the same way that when you watch Gogglebox, you see what people are like in their front room", "you get couples who supposedly love each other but you put them behind the wheel of a car and they speak to each other in the most intolerable way". One Show presenter Rory Bremner described it as "Mr & Mrs meets Top Gear meets The Chase"

=== Round One: Hazard Highway ===
The teams take turns to complete a timed obstacle course, laid out inside a small race track, part of which also serves as the course finish straight.

The obstacles are negotiated as follows:

- Multi-Scary Car Park – beginning at an elevated starting position, the car must descend down a steeply curved ramp, and through a car park barrier at ground level
- Tin Can Alley – the car must negotiate a narrow gap by going up on two wheels through the use of a ramp on the right hand side of the car
- The SeeSaw – the car must negotiate two see-saw ramps
- Bridge Of Doom – a series of ramps and bridges, ending with a descent back to ground level with a watered ramp (i.e. the car enters an uncontrollable slide)
- Human Sat Nav – the driver must put on blackout goggles, and then the co-driver must give them verbal directions through a roadwork themed course, including The Stig emptying some muddy gravel onto the roof of the car using an excavator
- Car Wash – the car must proceed through a tunnel filled with soap suds
- Car Football – the team must use the car to push a giant football across a penalty box into a goal, past giant inflatable defenders

The fastest three automatically qualify for Round Two, the remaining two must compete in a playoff to decide which team is eliminated from the show.

==== Round One race off ====
The co-driver of each team must sit in a car driven by either the Red Stig or Blue Stig, as they race each other around the mini-track for two laps. Just before they set off, they are given a question which will have multiple possible answers (e.g. from Episode 1: "Countries whose name ends with the letter A") – the winner is the team who gives the most right answers.

=== Round Two: Off-Road Rage ===
The four remaining teams must take turns to race a timed lap of an off-road course, featuring the named corners Cape of No Hope and Cheetah's Corner, and a hump obstacle Sillymanjaro. Their final time is their raw time plus any time penalties incurred, issued as follows:

- 5 seconds for knocking over a white Stig obstacle
- 10 seconds for knocking over a red Stig obstacle
- 30 seconds if they need to be assisted back onto the track

The fastest two teams automatically qualify for Round Three, the remaining two must compete in a playoff to decide who become the second team eliminated from the show.

==== Round Two race off ====
As with Round One, the Round Two payoff involves the team co-drivers having to answer a multi-choice question as they sit in a car driven at speed by Red Stig and Blue Stig, although in this case on the off-road course and for only one lap. If both teams give the same number of answers, it reverts to the speed.

=== Round Three: Drive-Thru ===
In Round Three, on a stretch of tarmac next to the mini-track, the last three teams must repeatedly race each other down three parallel and segregated winding race lanes. At the end of their lanes they must choose to smash through one of two foam walls each painted with a picture on it (each lane having their own pair of walls with the same pictures). The pictures represent one right and one wrong answer to a question asked just before the cars set off on each race (e.g. in Episode 1 they are country flags and the question is "The Eurostar links Great Britain, France and which other country – Belgium or Holland?").

At the start of the round, each team has two lives, and at the end of each race one team loses a life, decided based on which team(s) answered wrongly, and if multiple teams got it wrong (or if all got it right) the tie is resolved based on who finished slowest. The races are repeated until two teams have been eliminated by losing both their lives.

=== Final Round: The Getaway Chase ===
In Round Four, the final team must race the Getaway Car around the mini-track at night, for a maximum of two laps, pursued by The Stig in a supercar described as "significantly faster" than the Getaway Car. To make it a fair contest, the team are given a head start of a number of seconds, worked out on a case by case basis by the "pit crew" (e.g. 8 seconds in Episode 1). The race ends when either The Stig passes the team, leaving them with whatever money they have won, or they reach the finish line, winning the £10,000 prize. Along the course are three money gates with set values (£1,000, £2,000, £3,000 on the first lap, £6,000, £8,000 and £10,000 on the second), which, if reached by the team before they are passed, denote the prize money they will win. The £3,000/£10,000 money gate is the finish line.

== Cars ==
For the Round One obstacle course, the teams are driving old, modified Volkswagen Golfs, fitted with roll bars and painted in their team colours in a theme, aided with a large symbol mounted on their roof.

For the Round One race-off, Red Stig and Blue Stig are driving identical Jaguar F-Type S coupes, painted metallic red or blue.

For the Round Two off-road course, the teams are driving new off-road buggies, painted in their team colours.

For the Round Two race-off, Red Stig and Blue Stig are driving identical Polaris 4 by 4s, painted red or blue.

In Round Three, the teams each race identical new Fiat 500 Abarths or Mini Coopers, identified with their respective coloured team markings.

In the Final Round, the Getaway Car is a Toyota 86 painted white with two black stripes, described as the fastest car they will have driven in the competition. The Stig pursues the team in supercar described as "significantly faster" than the Getaway Car, with the model chosen on an episode by episode basis. In Episode 1, it is a Mercedes AMG GT S, painted white.

== Reception ==
The show received mixed reviews from critics. Radio Times described it as "fun family entertainment to drive away the January blues", adding the show, "which sees couples team up, row and give The Stig a run for his money, is a winner", however Matt Baylis in the Daily Express said that "the only viewers who could have stayed the course, I suspect, would have been TV critics or people forced to watch it while being interrogated in secret CIA prisons". Michael Hogan of The Daily Telegraph noted that "the longer the show went on, the more its faults became apparent" and described the show as "slow, repetitive and unevenly paced" and feeling "like an over-stretched segment on Top Gear, TFI Friday or a bushtucker trial".
