= Llechwedd Slate Caverns =

Tourist attraction in Gwynedd, Wales

Coordinates: 53.0046°N 3.9403°W

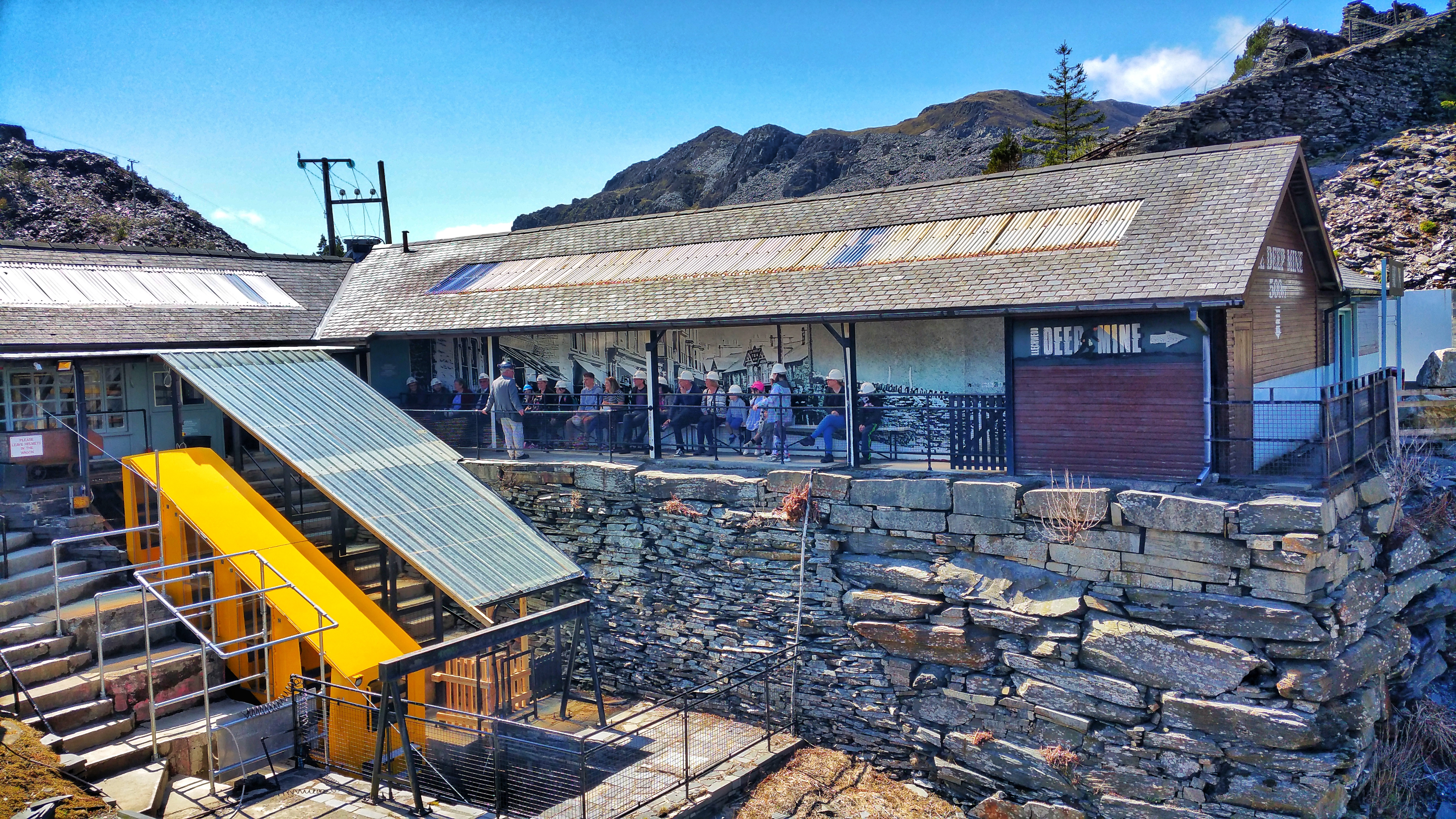
The entrance to the Llechwedd Deep Mine Tour and narrow gauge railway (left).

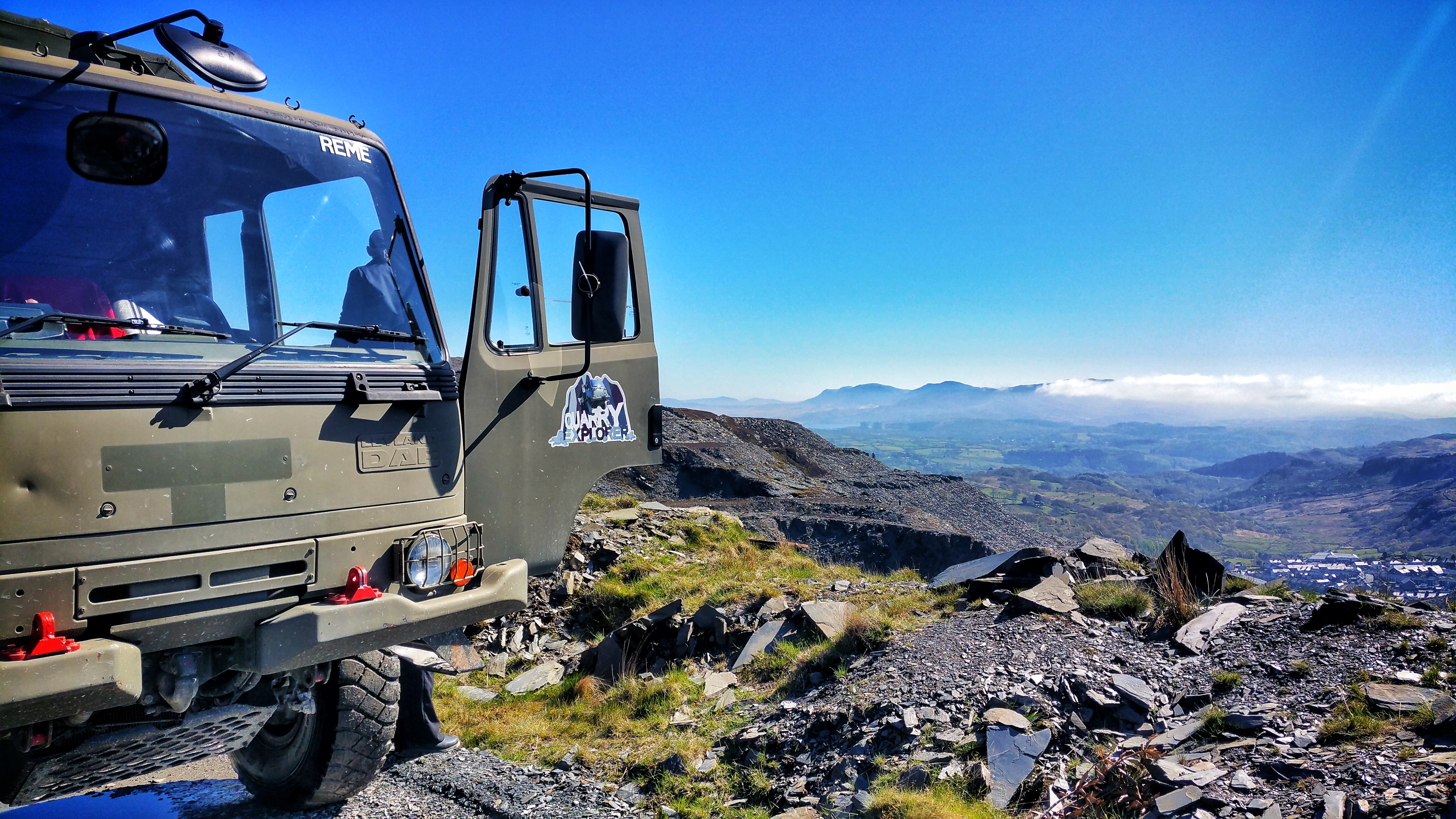
The Quarry Explorer Tour reaches the highest point of the Llechwedd Quarry site.

Llechwedd (Welsh pronunciation: [ɬɛχˈwɛð]) is a visitor attraction near Blaenau Ffestiniog, Gwynedd, Wales. It details the history of slate quarrying in the town and specifically the Llechwedd quarry in which it is located. The main aspect of Llechwedd is its Llechwedd Deep Mine Tour which has the steepest narrow gauge railway in the UK and travels over 500 feet (150 m) underground to the disused slate caverns, and the Quarry Explorer Tour which heads out to the furthest reaches of the Llechwedd site to explore the history of mining in the area.

The attraction also incorporates Mountain biking tracks, Zip-lines and giant underground trampolines. Bounce Below is right beside the underground zip wire, Zip World Caverns and Zip World Titan - the longest zip course in Europe.

== History ==
The 2 ft (610 mm) narrow gauge Miners' Tramway, opened in 1972 under the name "Quarry Tours", was a railway travelling 800 metres underground. The trains were hauled by battery-electric locomotives and travelled through tunnels and into a series of quarry chambers. The tramway's closure in 2014, as part of a revamp of the caverns, caused some controversy. The Deep Mine, opened in 1979, is accessed by the 3 ft (914 mm) narrow gauge Deep Mine Railway, a steep passenger incline railway with a gradient of 1:1.8 or 30°. At the foot of the railway, visitors can walk through several tunnels and chambers of the mine.

In 1992 the Deep Mine displays were upgraded using audio-visual technology supplied by Eurodisney.

In 2014 the Bounce Below attraction, described as "the world's largest underground trampoline", opened in the mine caverns along with the Zip World wire course outside. As part of the 2014 developments a new guided Victorian Mine Tour opened combining the inclined railway, the tunnels from the two previous tours and some tunnels newly opened to the public.

In 2015 the Zip World Caverns wire course opened within the caves.

In January 2019 a television crew took over the caverns for a week to film the world's first ever underground games show, Y Siambr, broadcast later in the year on S4C.

== Awards ==
The Caverns were claimed by Ivor Wynne Jones, a director of Llechwedd Slate Caverns, to be "winner of every major tourism award".

In 1976, the opening year, Llechwedd won the British Tourist Authority's "Come to Britain" award, their top award.

In 1980, the caverns were awarded the "Silver Otter" award from the British Guild of Travel Writers. That year, they also won their third award from the British Tourist Authority - the first British tourist attraction to win three of these awards.

== See also ==
- Slate industry in Wales
- British narrow gauge slate railways
- Gloddfa Ganol
