= Sonic Lost World =

2013 video game by Sega

- Developers: Sonic Team (Wii U) (Note: Ported to Windows by Sega Europe); Dimps (3DS)
- Publisher: Sega
- Directors: Morio Kishimoto (Wii U); Takao Hirabayashi (3DS)
- Producers: Takashi Iizuka; Hiroyuki Kawano (3DS)
- Programmers: Yoshitaka Kawabata (Wii U); Masato Nakahashi (3DS)
- Artists: Sachiko Kawamura; Yuji Uekawa
- Writers: Ken Pontac; Warren Graff; Harumasa Nakajima
- Composers: Tomoya Ohtani; Takahito Eguchi
- Series: Sonic the Hedgehog
- Platforms: Wii U; Nintendo 3DS; Windows
- Release: Wii U, Nintendo 3DS: EU: October 18, 2013; AU: October 19, 2013; JP: October 24, 2013; NA: October 29, 2013; Windows: WW: November 2, 2015
- Genre: Platform
- Modes: Single-player, multiplayer

Sonic Lost World (Note: Japanese: ソニックロストワールド, Hepburn: Sonikku Rosuto Wārudo) is a 2013 platform game developed by Sonic Team and published by Sega. Part of the Sonic the Hedgehog series, it was released in October 2013 for the Wii U and Nintendo 3DS. It was developed as a partnership between Sega and Nintendo, who allowed downloadable content based on their properties as well as distributed the game in PAL regions; a port of the Wii U version for Windows without Nintendo content was later released in November 2015.

Lost World focuses on the efforts of Sonic the Hedgehog to stop the Deadly Six, an alien tribe that serves as the game's main antagonists, as they seek to siphon the world's energy from the Lost Hex, the game's setting. Sonic and his long-time sidekick Tails must team up with Doctor Eggman, normally their enemy, to stop the Deadly Six, leading to conflicts among the three parties. While the gameplay is typical of the Sonic series in some ways, it adds parkour mechanics and features largely cylindrical level design with an emphasis on alternate pathways. The game also features the Wisp creatures from Sonic Colors as power-ups.

The game began development shortly after the 2010 release of Sonic Colors. It was designed to be streamlined and fluid in movement and design, using tube-like level design and a simple, bright color scheme. The game received mixed reviews upon release; its controls and the Deadly Six were frequently criticized, but its visuals and audio were seen positively. Downloadable content was released both alongside and after the game's release, adding features such as additional levels and a new type of Wisp power.

== Gameplay ==
Sonic Lost World is a platform game with action-adventure elements, in which the player controls Sonic the Hedgehog as he travels across the Lost Hex in order to rescue captured animals and stop the Deadly Six. Levels range from side-scrolling 2D levels to fast-moving 3D linear levels to levels taking place on spherical worlds similar to the cancelled Sonic X-treme and the Super Mario Galaxy games. This also translates to the 3DS version, as it was the first handheld game in the series presented entirely in 3D.

In-game screenshot of the "Frozen Factory" level from the Wii U version

The game uses a new control system which allows players to control Sonic's speed. Simply moving the directional controls will move Sonic at a moderate pace, allowing for more precision. Holding down a trigger button will cause Sonic to sprint, allowing him to move faster and perform new parkour moves, such as running up and along walls and hopping over small ledges. In the air, Sonic can perform a double jump, which returns from Sonic Colors, a homing attack, which can now target multiple enemies in quick succession, and a new kick attack, which can be used to defeat stronger enemies, or knock them into others.

The initial set of Wisps introduced in Sonic Colors, alongside the "Indigo Asteroid" wisp introduced in Lost World

Also returning from Colors are the Wisp creatures, which provide short-lived power-ups to Sonic. The Wisps' powers are now controlled using the Wii U GamePad's touchscreen and gyroscopic features. Alongside returning powers such as Drill, Laser and Rocket, new powers include Eagle, which lets Sonic fly through the air, Asteroid, which atomizes objects in his path, and Rhythm, which lets him bounce along a path of notes. There are also some Wisps exclusive to each version of the game. During the game, players can rescue animals by destroying enemies or opening containers, allowing players to progress, or find Red Star Rings that open up circus-themed bonus stages where players can earn more animals. Collecting all the Red Star Rings in the game unlocks the ability to transform into Super Sonic.

The Wii U version supports both co-operative multiplayer, in which a second player can control a remote-controlled vehicle to assist Sonic, and competitive multiplayer, in which a second player can use the Wii U Gamepad screen to race against the other player. The game also supports Off-TV Play functionality and formerly Miiverse. Using Miiverse, players could exchange items such as Wisps or shields, which would grow more effective if they were used by other players. The 3DS version supports both local and online multiplayer for up to four players. Players may also customise RC vehicles in the 3DS version, which can then be used in the Wii U version.

== Plot ==
=== Characters ===
The game stars Sonic the Hedgehog, who must defeat the main antagonist Doctor Eggman and stop the Deadly Six. Aiding him in his quest is his best friend Tails, a fox who has the ability to fly. Knuckles the Echidna, Sonic's strong friend, and Amy Rose, Sonic's self-proclaimed girlfriend, also make relatively minor appearances.

The main antagonist of the series, Doctor Eggman, a mad scientist who is now forced to assist Sonic in stopping the Deadly Six. Eggman's henchmen Orbot and Cubot make a return appearance. Also serving as the main antagonists and boss characters are the Deadly Six, a group of the world's indigenous Zeti race consisting of the hyperactive Zazz; the obese and dim-witted Zomom; Master Zik, the elderly founder of the tribe and Zavok's teacher; the flirtatious and self-absorbed Zeena; the diminutive and pessimistic Zor; and Zavok, the leader of the tribe. The tribe plans to steal the life energy from Sonic's world to increase their own power.

=== Story ===
Sonic and Tails pursue Doctor Eggman, who has captured several of their animal friends with the intention of using them to power his robot army. While the two attempt to retrieve a falling capsule filled with animals, Eggman shoots down Tails' plane. However, they end up discovering a world in the sky known as the Lost Hex, and crash land there. As they explore the world, the duo discover that Eggman has enlisted the aid of a group of the world's indigenous Zeti race, collectively known as the Deadly Six, using a magical conch to keep them under his command. However, when Sonic rushes in and kicks the conch away, the Deadly Six betray Eggman and take control of his Badnik army. They then start to use one of Eggman's machines to siphon energy from Sonic's world below, planning to drain all of its life force until there is nothing left and use it to power themselves up. Reluctantly, Sonic agrees to work with Eggman, believing that he needs his help to stop the machine, though this seems to cause some distrust between him and Tails.

As Sonic battles his way throughout the Lost Hex, the Deadly Six concoct a plan to capture Sonic and turn him into a robot under their control, but they end up accidentally capturing Tails instead. After Eggman is seemingly killed falling into lava, Sonic comes across the Deadly Six as they prepare to use the roboticized Tails against him. However, prior to the conversion, Tails managed to reprogram the process to retain his free will and instead helps Sonic to defeat them. Upon reaching the machine and finding it already switched off, Eggman reappears, having faked his death and used the energy harvested to power his latest giant mech. Sonic defeats Eggman, sending him falling to the planet's surface, and he and Tails restore the stolen energy to the world below before returning home.

In a post-credits scene, Orbot and Cubot find Eggman, who has survived his fall, and they dig him out of a soft spot of dirt he landed on. Upon realizing that half of his mustache is missing, Eggman throws another tantrum, prompting Orbot and Cubot to run away in fear.

== Development ==
Development for Sonic Lost World started shortly after Sonic Colors was finished, when a few core members started the experimentation for the former and took place over two-and-a-half years. Sonic Team sought to streamline the controls, increase the length, and add more diverse levels compared to previous entries in the series. After reviewing the history of the franchise with Sonic Generations, game producer Takashi Iizuka hoped to "deliver a new experience" with Sonic Lost World. Development started on PC, with early experiments involving "twisted tube-type level[s]" inspired by Jack and the Beanstalk. As the concept "was totally new", early levels had to be remade "over and over." Players were given greater ability to control Sonic's speed in an effort to create a more traditional platforming experience. The parkour mechanic was introduced to maintain a more fluid sense of movement, in contrast to previous Sonic games where running into a wall would force the player to a complete stop. Iizuka stated that "This game is like going into the rabbit hole in Alice in Wonderland, an action game where you can experience many strange and fun experiences."

Concept art for Windy Hill, the first stage in the game

Development ultimately focused on the Wii U and 3DS because of the success of previous Sonic games on Nintendo platforms. Because Wii U "has two monitors to use", Sonic Team decided to include both cooperative and competitive multiplayer modes. The Wii U GamePad's touch screen and gyroscope were employed to activate the returning Color Powers. The 3DS version, co-developed with Dimps, was designed to "fully utilize" the 3DS hardware with 3D gameplay and motion controls. Development was harder on 3DS due to its more limited processing power. Iizuka stated that the Color Powers are "essential" to the level design of the 3DS version, while they work as an "additional tool" in the Wii U version. A simple art style was used to make objects stand out more against the backgrounds, and to keep the game running at a consistent 60 frames per second. The design of the new "Deadly Six" villains was based on that of an ogre, and each one's appearance was intended to reflect a certain key characteristic of their personality, which the developers hoped players could see "just by looking at them." The Wii U version of the game was directed by Morio Kishimoto, the director of Sonic Colors and the lead designer of Sonic and the Black Knight, while the 3DS version was directed by Takao Hirabayashi, the director of Sonic Colors DS, and previously lead designer of Sonic Unleashed PS2/Wii.

Sega trademarked the title Sonic Lost World in May 2013. The game was revealed on May 17, 2013, in a Nintendo Direct announcement, as part of an exclusive partnership between Sega and Nintendo for the Sonic the Hedgehog series. In this partnership, Nintendo would ultimately publish the fourth entry to the Mario & Sonic at the Olympic Games series, while distributing physical copies of Sonic Lost World and Sonic Boom: Shattered Crystal in PAL regions. Sega reported that more on the game would be revealed before E3 2013, and that the game would contain both returning and new original characters, both in enemies and friends of Sonic. The first trailer for the game was released on May 28, a day earlier than previously announced. A downloadable demo of the game's first stage was made available for both consoles on October 9 in Japan and in mid-November in North America and Europe. To promote the release of Sonic Lost World, Hardlight released an update for Sonic Dash that includes a boss battle against Zazz, one of the Deadly Six. Super Smash Bros. for Wii U also includes a stage based on Windy Hill Zone from the game.

The soundtrack was composed and directed by Tomoya Ohtani, with Takahito Eguchi handling the orchestration and cutscene music. Naofumi Hataya also contributed a single piece, the theme for "Desert Ruins Zone - Act 3". A three-disc soundtrack, Sonic Lost World Original Soundtrack Without Boundaries, was released physically in Japan and digitally worldwide via iTunes and Amazon Music on November 27, 2013.

A special, limited stock "Deadly Six" edition of the Wii U version of the game was available for pre-order, which included special "Nightmare" downloadable content (DLC), featuring a new stage and boss battles based on one of Sonic Team's previous games, Nights into Dreams. Clearing the DLC unlocks a special Color Power, the Black Bomb, normally only obtainable via Miiverse. Pre-ordering the game from Amazon.com allowed the player to start off with twenty-five extra lives.

A patch for the Wii U version was released on December 10, 2013, adding additional features such as button controls for some Wisps and the traditional extra life reward for collecting 100 rings. On December 18, 2013, Nintendo announced two exclusive pieces of free DLC for the Wii U version based on other Nintendo games. The first DLC stage, "Yoshi's Island Zone", was released on the day of the announcement, with a second installment, "The Legend of Zelda Zone", released on March 27, 2014. A Windows port was released by Sega on November 1, 2015. The DLC stages were later integrated into this version via unofficial mods due to Nintendo's refusal to allow it to be officially on the Windows version.

== Reception ==
Reception

Aggregate score
Aggregator	Score		
Aggregator	3DS	PC	Wii U
Metacritic	59/100	57/100	63/100

Review scores
Publication	Score		
Publication	3DS	PC	Wii U
Computer and Video Games	N/A	N/A	7/10
Destructoid	N/A	N/A	7.5/10
Edge	N/A	N/A	4/10
Electronic Gaming Monthly	N/A	N/A	6.5/10
Eurogamer	N/A	N/A	4/10
Famitsu	34/40	N/A	36/40
Game Informer	N/A	N/A	5/10
GameRevolution	1/5	N/A	1/5
GameSpot	N/A	N/A	5/10
GamesRadar+	2.5/5	N/A	4/5
GamesTM	4/10	6/10	6/10
GameTrailers	N/A	N/A	7.6/10
IGN	6.8/10	N/A	5.8/10
Joystiq	N/A	N/A	2.5/5
Nintendo Life	5/10	N/A	7/10
Nintendo World Report	5.5/10	N/A	9/10
Official Nintendo Magazine	79%	N/A	80%
PC Gamer (US)	N/A	32%	N/A
Polygon	4/10	N/A	6/10
VideoGamer.com	N/A	N/A	5/10
Empire	N/A	N/A	2/5

Sonic Lost World received "mixed or average" reviews, according to video game review aggregator Metacritic.

The game's presentation was well received. Chris Plante (Polygon) praised the Wii U version's visuals and music as some of the series' best. Tim Turi (Game Informer) positively compared the game's music to that of Super Mario Galaxy. Mark Walton (GameSpot) and Chris Scullion (Computer and Video Games) singled out the candy-themed "Dessert Ruins" level as a visual highlight. However, Turi made note of heavy video compression on the 3DS version's cutscenes. Vince Ingenito (IGN) was favorable to the art direction and stable framerate, but criticized the color palette. Chris Schilling (Eurogamer) was effusive: "Blue skies forever!"

Strong criticism was directed at the game's control scheme, especially the new parkour mechanic. Turi stated the parkour system was difficult to understand, making sections where it was mandatory frustrating. Walton and Matthew Castle (Official Nintendo Magazine) agreed. Ingenito found it problematic that Sonic tends to wall-run on every nearby vertical surface. Schilling singled out the multi-lock homing attack, writing that while it usually worked fine, it appeared to fail at random intervals. Ingenito and Turi agreed. Castle struggled with the homing attack sometimes having a small lock-on window. However Justin Towell (GamesRadar) defended the control scheme, explaining that while it had a learning curve, it also felt like a modernization of Sonic's traditional level traversal. Reona Ebihara (Famitsu) stated that the ability to slow down made the game easier to play for beginners. However, Turi criticized Sonic's awkward momentum and imprecise jumps, stating that switching between two speeds was jarring and made platforming difficult. Schilling excoriated the controls as the worst in the series, feeling that the walk speed was too slow while the run speed made precise platforming too difficult. Ingenito agreed, considering the controls the most inconsistent in the series.

Several critics felt that Sonic controlled better on the 3DS. Jose Otero (IGN) said the parkour made obstacles easy to clear in this version. Joe Skrebels (Official Nintendo Magazine) felt that Sonic was much easier to control at high speed on 3DS than Wii U. Stephen Totilo (Kotaku) stated that the 3DS version does a better job of teaching the controls, although Turi derided its frequent tutorials. However, Schilling felt the homing attack was less effective on 3DS.

Reaction to the game's level design was mixed. Turi made note of oddly placed invisible springs in the Wii U version's levels, and expressed frustration with the 3DS version's puzzles. Walton preferred the 2D sections to the 3D sections. Plante praised the creativity of the Wii U version's 3D stage design while decrying its 2D stages as clunky. Philip Kollar (Polygon) was harsher on the 3DS version due to its confusing level design and puzzles. Ingenito stated that the Wii U version's levels were not cohesive. Otero praised the 3DS version's levels for featuuring alternate pathways, but was frustrated by the "trial and error" required to complete the 3D stages. Castle stated that the Wii U version's best stages made effective use of Sonic's speed, while Skrebels felt the 3DS version featured levels well-suited for handheld play. Totilo praised the 3DS levels, finding them player-friendly, but panned the Wii U levels for poorly explaining player directives. Schilling wrote that he experienced a sharp difficulty spike partway through. Edge noted that "Sonic games, and platformers in general, have always been about memorizing the lay of the land, but rarely have mistakes been so costly or heavily punished."

The alternate gameplay styles polarized many critics. Daniel Cairns (VideoGamer.com) and Castle highlighted the level where Sonic becomes a giant snowball, comparing it to Super Monkey Ball, whereas Turi and Ingenito found it irritating and difficult to control. Turi encountered multiple game overs while playing a mandatory pinball sequence. Walton felt that some of the Wisps were interesting, but problematic motion controls and short time limits impaired their utility. Justin Speer (GameTrailers) stated that the Wisps felt out-of-place in the Wii U version. Totilo preferred how the Wisps were implemented in the 3DS version, but Towell stated that their mechanics were clumsy and interrupted the gameplay. Towell described the 3DS version's motion-controlled Special Stages as borderline unplayable. Totilo and Castle criticized the Wii U version's Jetpack Joyride-style flying levels, while Turi and Totilo criticized the Wii U version's balloon-popping minigame. Turi called the Wii U version's co-op mode useless. Castle wrote that the game's framerate impedes the potential fun of two-player races.

The Deadly Six were negatively received. Towell found the personalities of the characters to be enjoyable and stereotypical, but was disappointed by the poor quality of their dialogue. Speer called the boss battles anticlimactic, and Ingenito found them extremely boring. Turi described the Deadly Six as generic, forgettable, and annoying. EGM Now observed that the inclusion of the Deadly Six subverted the familiar Sonic-versus-Dr. Eggman concept, but questioned whether the plot was a clever self-parody or had been "scrawled together by a couple of grade-schoolers".

Critics disagreed over what to make of the game as a whole. In 2015, USgamer referred to Lost World as one of the best Sonic games. James Stephanie Sterling of Destructoid said while the game was flawed, in it "one sees far more to love than hate." Plante noted that the strongest stages were the earliest ones, while the later stages continued to degrade in quality. David McComb (Empire) called it a disappointment compared to the games that preceded it. Walton concluded that the game suffered by trying to too closely imitate the Mario series.

=== Sales ===
During its opening week in the UK, Sonic Lost World charted at #11 on the All-formats chart for sales, but achieved the top spot on the Wii U chart and #4 on the Nintendo 3DS chart. As of the end of 2013, Sega had shipped 640,000 copies of the game. As of March 31, 2014, the game had sold 710,000 copies, being one of the lowest selling in the franchise, alongside the first two Sonic Boom games, released a year after.
