= Headhunter (video game) =

2001 video game

- Developer: Amuze
- Publishers: EU: Sega (Dreamcast); EU: Sony Computer Entertainment (PS2); NA: Acclaim Entertainment
- Director: John Kroknes
- Producers: John Kroknes; Stefan Holmqvist
- Designer: Peter Johansson
- Artist: Johan Lindh
- Writer: Philip Lawrence
- Composer: Richard Jacques
- Platforms: Dreamcast; PlayStation 2
- Release: Dreamcast: EU: 16 November 2001; PlayStation 2: EU: 22 March 2002; NA: 14 May 2002
- Genre: Action-adventure
- Mode: Single-player

Headhunter is a 2001 action-adventure video game developed by Amuze and published by Sega for the Dreamcast. It was ported to the PlayStation 2 the following year. A sequel was released in 2004 called Headhunter Redemption for the PlayStation 2 and Xbox.

== Gameplay ==
For the majority of the game, the gameplay is that of a cover-based third-person shooter as players control protagonist Jack Wade. Jack travels between the main levels of the game on his motorcycle, and these sections take the form of a racing game, with the motorbike's acceleration and braking controlled using the sensitive analogue trigger buttons of the Dreamcast control pad.

== Plot ==
The game takes place in the near future in a city similar to Los Angeles, California. Criminals are punished for their crimes not only by serving time in prison but by having their internal organs surgically removed (if they lost to another prisoner in an underwater arena) and transplanted to benefit the wealthier members of society. Officially responsible for law enforcement are the Anti-Crime Network (ACN) organisation and their employees, the bounty hunter-like Headhunters. In order to prevent damage occurring to the criminals' organs as they are apprehended, conventional firearms have been banned, replaced by Electric Neural Projectile (ENP) guns that fire special bullets which do not damage flesh but instead emit an electrical charge that causes severe pain in victims, paralyses muscles and eventually kills the brain. According to the game, ENP technology was developed by Biotech and the main manufacturer of ENP handguns is Smith & Easton (a reference to the firearms manufacturer Smith & Wesson), although the technology can also be used with grenades, proximity mines, rocket launchers and other explosives.

The game begins with Jack Wade escaping from a secret laboratory, but soon after going outside he faints and falls unconscious. He wakes up in hospital and learns that he is suffering from amnesia and that although he was once the very best Headhunter, his license has now been revoked. In order to investigate the murder of ACN founder Christopher Stern, he must re-earn his Headhunter licence by taking part in virtual-reality tests (called LEILA tests) and capture some of the most dangerous criminals in the city. Throughout the game, Jack is aided by Christopher Stern's daughter Angela and his old boss Chief Hawke; although he also finds that his main rival to the title of best Headhunter is the unpleasant Hank Redwood.

The game's storyline progresses through standard FMV cutscenes, propaganda commercials and satirical news broadcasts (presented by the fictional Bill Waverley and Kate Gloss).

== Development ==
Headhunter is the first game to be developed by Amuze, a Swedish video game developer based in Solna. It was established in 1996 by John Kroknes and Stefan Holmqvist. they would close down after developing Headhunter Redemption. According to John Kroknes, creative director at Amuze, the game was strongly influenced by 1980s action movies and Paul Verhoeven's science fiction films. Headhunter is the first video game to have its score recorded at Abbey Road Studios.

== Reception ==
Reception

Aggregate score
Aggregator	Score	
Aggregator	Dreamcast	PS2
Metacritic	87/100	74/100

Review scores
Publication	Score	
Publication	Dreamcast	PS2
Edge	8/10	
Eurogamer	9/10	
GameSpot		7.7/10
GameSpy	7/10	72%
IGN	9/10	8.4/10
Official U.S. PlayStation Magazine		3/5

The Dreamcast version received "generally favorable reviews", while the PlayStation 2 version received "average" reviews, according to video game review aggregator Metacritic.

The Dreamcast version received a highly favorable review from Eurogamer's Tom Bramwell. Bramwell in his review noted that it had been compared to Metal Gear Solid, but considered the setting and story to be superior in Headhunter. The game was described as "a masterpiece of modern videogame development".
