= Headhunter Redemption =

2004 video game

- Developer: Amuze
- Publisher: Sega
- Director: John Kroknes
- Designer: Peter Johansson
- Writer: Philip Lawrence
- Composer: Richard Jacques
- Engine: RenderWare
- Platforms: PlayStation 2, Xbox
- Release: EU: 27 August 2004; AU: 3 September 2004; NA: 21 September 2004
- Genre: Action-adventure
- Mode: Single-player

Headhunter Redemption is a 2004 action-adventure video game developed by Amuze and published by Sega for the PlayStation 2 and Xbox. It is the sequel to Headhunter and the last game to be developed by Amuze before its closure.

== Plot ==
Set twenty years after the Bloody Mary Virus (released in the original Headhunter), Jack and his new partner Leeza X find out something is amiss when they try to stop Weapon Smugglers. The pair must face opposition from the Glass Skyscrapers filled and media controlled 'Above' and The Dregs & Criminal Infested colonies of 'Below'. Jack and Leeza must also face their fears as they try to redeem a world from chaos, especially Jack, whose son was taken away by forces from 'Below', but might still be alive.

== Development ==
Headhunter: Redemption is the second and final entry in the franchise Headhunter. According to creative director John Kroknes, the name of the game was chosen because it "sounds cool", and also in an attempt to reflect the studio's desire to "give real depth to [their] characters and storyline". Jack and his partner Leeza X "face personal demons and grow as characters during their adventure […]. They redeem themselves from past mistakes and give society a chance to start over."

Gameplay-wise, Redemption retains "all the core elements of the Headhunter world" but focuses slightly less on stealth "in favour of more intense combat action": shooting "is the core, with a range of evasive manoeuvres" necessary to thrive against enemies. In spite of this, stealth often remains "a wise tactical approach - a way of evening the odds before plunging into a firefight." Bike riding sequences were removed in this sequel because many players found them "frustrating" in the first game. While developing Redemption, the team "felt that the biking sequences distracted from the flow of the story and the gameplay", and they didn't want to make it a "mini-game" or disappoint players by not offering "the kind of limitless roaming expect[ed] with vehicles today." That being said, Jack still rides his bike but, unlike in the previous game, it only appears in a few cutscenes, "pretty much for the nostalgia factor".

== Reception ==
Reception

Aggregate score
Aggregator	Score	
Aggregator	PS2	Xbox
Metacritic	62/100	59/100

Review scores
Publication	Score	
Publication	PS2	Xbox
Eurogamer		5/10
GameSpot	6.1/10	6.1/10
IGN	7/10	7/10
Official U.S. PlayStation Magazine	3/5	
Official Xbox Magazine (US)		5.9/10
Maxim	6/10	6/10
The Times	4/5	4/5

Headhunter Redemption received "mixed or average" reviews, according to video game review aggregator Metacritic.

According to John Kroknes, the game didn't sell well, due to a "complete lack of marketing support" from Sega.
