= DCI Global Partnerships =

Christian organisation

The DCI School of Mission is a Christian network of people, projects, and supporters that was founded in England in 1985. The DCI Trust is the registered charity that operates these projects.

== DCI projects ==
=== DCI Schools of Mission ===
Since 1985, this mission has operated across five continents and in 27 languages. Its primary goal is to promote awareness of Jesus while training disciples and leaders to improve the lives of the most vulnerable in their communities. The DCI Schools of Mission are entirely free, borderless, and accessible to all, with no tuition or fees ever required.

The DCI website is http://www.dci.org.uk

Facebook is https://www.facebook.com/DCISchoolOfMission

They are edited by volunteer translators.

=== Banking for the Poorest ===
Banking for the Poorest points towards no-interest microloans of start-up capital or animals for those who are poor, destitute, landless, widows, orphans, and the victims of loan sharks, in order to create jobs and opportunity.

== Missiological analysis ==
=== Historical context ===
The work of DCI Trust began in the mid-1980s on the backside of a period of history that Bosch describes as having "shaken Western civilization to the core." Bosch noted globalization was in full stride, with rates of poverty and inequality never greater and modernity giving way to post-modernity. He saw other concerns such as Christendom giving way to secular multiculturalism in Europe, whilst in Asia, Africa and South America, non-western Christianity is gaining new converts, energy and confidence at astonishing rates.

Thus, the forging of DCI's concerns and priorities has taken place in a period during which the world Christian mission movement has experienced both a growing urgency and awareness, as new technologies have allowed researchers and statisticians to investigate, analyse, assimilate and represent global trends with degrees of comprehension previously inaccessible—for example, in 1978 the global prayer manual Operation World was first published, following which the evangelically-resistant belt of the 10/40 Window was identified, focused upon and targeted—making the world's poorest, most neglected and most evangelically unreached peoples reachable as never before.

=== Social impact ===
DCI Trust has grown to represent an international, interdenominational community spanning five continents and reaching people of over 100 different nationalities. Its vocational work focuses mainly upon the poor within developing nations, empowering them through leadership training, micro-loans, business-development and community-building projects.

Through networking with indigenous, localized leaders, DCI has contributed towards a wide array of projects, including "buildings for churches, schools and families; computers, camels...cars; farms, seeds...stock; medicines...operations; schools for children and adults; spectacles...tools...wheelchairs...workshops...bee-keeping...tree-planting...horticulture, home management, nutrition, HIV/AIDS training, fish farming, brick making, baking, disinfectant manufacture, tailoring courses, and skill training schools."

- In Indonesia, DCI has partnered with Christian business people in the establishment of a small factory producing doormats, employing mainly Muslims and feeding profits back into the local church. In Burkina Faso, it has partnered with local people in the cultivation of a banana plantation, covering four hectares of dry, semi-desert land, producing local employment and a regular substantial harvest of this cash crop.
- In Uganda, it has partnered in developing a growing, self-reproducing "goat bank"
- In Aduku, northern Uganda, a village banking project begun with half-a-million Ugandan shillings in 2003 oversaw a series of micro-loans to widows and orphans—made so by war, terrorist violence and AIDS—resulting in the growth of the fund to two-and-a-half million shillings by 2006 with no business failures. The project also supports children's education.

=== Mission ===
DCI World Christian Network's web portal is used to disseminate news submitted by subscribers and visitors to the website. Regular updates concerning profiled projects and people are disseminated to subscribers via email newsletter.

- The DCI School Without Walls offers a series of educational outlines divided into six divisions of evangelism, missions, discipleship, money, leadership and church growth, plus instructions on how to start a low-cost school. Lessons include Bible memory verses, discussion topics, homework, meditations, written diploma work, biblical teaching and prayer prompts.
- Business for Mission projects involve mainly micro-loans within Africa and India through "bank for the poor" schemes, operated under the governance of a local committee, including the principal contact who has previously applied to the trust for funding. The committee announces the availability, within a village or locality, of interest-free or very low interest rate loans of $50 to $150.
- Christmas Parties for the Poor are annual events sponsored by DCI, in which community members in poor and neglected communities in places such as Malawi, Uganda, Peru, Indonesia, Thailand, Papua, Kenya and India are invited at Christmas time to a party where they receive food and gifts of clothing, books and seeds; hear the Gospel; and experience music and dance. Pocock writes: "For all the efficiency of rapid communication and... border obliterating technology, personal relationships and simple acts of kindness may, in the end, constitute the best strategies—and they may have the most appeal in a postmodern era."

=== Mission theory ===
The Trust has developed a post-modern, contextual theology of mission praxis. DCI stands firmly within the evangelical 'faith mission' heritage, with emphases upon faith, prayer, recognition and development of spiritual gifting‚ engagement in elements of spiritual warfare, motivation focusing upon God's glory rather than escape from hell and a cultural sensitivity that places a strong emphasis on indigenous leadership and strategy.

An open, relationship-centred approach marks the DCI movement as essentially postmodern, as typified by this introduction to the ministry: "The movement has no formal leaders, elders or written constitution other than the Bible. We work together in friendship, supporting each other in God's call to different kinds of lifestyle and mission." Its ecumenism is echoed in the welcome provided to Catholic visitors to the website and as the discreet place given to the formal statement of belief (Nicene Creed), as well as through encouragement to readers to act out their own faith, supplemented by the experience and resources offered by DCI.

The organisation focuses upon leadership and community development through locally initiated, managed and accountable training centers, echoing a trend which Pocock describes as an essential counterbalance for 'inter-networking' ministries powered by new technology, if they are to avoid "the dehumanizing tendency of globalization." Additionally, DCI's concentration upon biblical education constitutes a vital step towards transforming cultures towards a biblical worldview, something Miller considers an essential precursor to sustainable development.

In this context, DCI's focus upon financial partnership and economic development is under-girded by a biblically-based philosophy that envisages the whole task of mission as broader than vocal evangelism.

- For the poor, especially those receiving assistance, there is an emphasis upon "breaking the curse of poverty"—Miller refers to a 'mindset of poverty'—and avoiding dependency through economic self-start initiatives. Thus, micro-loans are offered with the single, declared aim of "creating genuine self-employment through micro-industries or working from home with the sole goal of being able to raise the owner and the workers to a place of self-sufficiency in life and enabling them eventually to be generous towards others."
- For the rich there is an emphasis upon generosity toward the poor, based upon the text of Deuteronomy 15.7-11; financial supporters of 'business for mission' projects are encouraged to consider their giving to it as definite "investments" regarding which they should expect a return, made possible by the Lord's blessing, according to Luke 19.13ff. The concept of 'Christmas parties for the poor' is based decisively upon the story in Luke 14.
- For those wanting to 'go' or extend their mission activities there is a novel challenge, away from traditional "fund-raising," towards prayerful "friend-raising" and "fund-releasing".
