= Dolphin Capital Investors =

Dolphin Capital Investors Ltd
- Traded as: AIM: DCI
- Industry: Property
- Founded: 2005
- Headquarters: Tortola, British Virgin Islands
- Key people: Miltos Kambourides, Founder; Pierre Charalambides, Co-Founder
- Products: Property Development, Property Investment
- Website: www.dolphinci.com

Dolphin Capital Investors (LSE: DCI) is a real estate investment company focusing on the residential resort sector in emerging markets, and listed on the Alternative Investment Market (AIM) of the London Stock Exchange. It is one of the largest real estate investment companies listed on AIM in terms of net assets value (NAV), with a NAV of €713 million as at 31 March 2012.

== History ==
Dolphin Capital Investors was founded in 2005 by Miltos Kambourides and Pierre Charalambides, and was admitted to trading on AIM on 8 December of that year.

In 2007, the company acquired Aristo Developers, the largest holiday home developer in Cyprus. Since its admission to AIM, the company has raised €900 million of equity capital.

== Operations ==
The company has a total portfolio of over 36 million square metres of land and 48 km of seafront, comprising 12 large-scale resorts under development in Greece, Cyprus, Croatia and Turkey and more than 60 smaller holiday home developments in Cyprus. The company opened its first resort, Amanzoe, in Porto Heli area of the Peloponnese, in August 2012. Its second resort, Nikki Beach Resort & Spa also in Porto Heli, opened in July 2014, and its third resort, Amanera in the Dominican Republic, opened in November 2015.
