= Sonic Boom: Fire & Ice =

2016 platform game

- Developer: Sanzaru Games
- Publisher: Sega
- Directors: Bill Spence; Mat Kraemer; Tin Guerrero; Harumasa Nakajima
- Producers: Jenny Huang; Takashi Iizuka; Toshihiro Nagoshi; Osamu Ohashi
- Designers: Andrew Rollins; Casey Holtz; John Hsia; Mark Boroff
- Programmers: Danny Kerp; Jon Gilardi; Nachi Lau
- Artists: Jeremy French; JF Lepine
- Writers: Ken Pontac; Warren Graff; Tin Guerrero
- Composer: Richard Jacques
- Series: Sonic the Hedgehog
- Platform: Nintendo 3DS
- Release: NA: September 27, 2016; EU: September 30, 2016; AU: October 1, 2016; JP: October 27, 2016
- Genres: Platform, action-adventure
- Modes: Single-player, multiplayer

Sonic Boom: Fire & Ice (Note: Released in Japan as Sonic Toon: Fire & Ice (Japanese: ソニックトゥーン ファイアー&(アンド)アイス, Hepburn: Sonikku Tūn: Faiā ando Aisu)) is a 2016 platform game developed by Sanzaru Games and published by Sega for the Nintendo 3DS. It is part of the Sonic Boom spin-off franchise of the Sonic the Hedgehog series, along with the games Sonic Boom: Rise of Lyric and Sonic Boom: Shattered Crystal and a television series. Originally planned for a release in late 2015, Fire & Ice was released in North America and Europe in September 2016, and in Australia the following month. While the game received mixed reviews, it was seen as an improvement over Rise of Lyric and Shattered Crystal.

== Gameplay ==
Gameplay screenshot

Like the previous 3DS entry, Shattered Crystal, Fire & Ice is a side-scrolling platform game in which Sonic and his companions fight their way through various stages. In addition to Sonic, Tails, Knuckles and Sticks, Amy returned from Rise of Lyric as a playable character. Like the previous game, players are able to switch between characters at will in order to use their unique abilities such as Sonic's speed, Tails' flight, Knuckles' strength, Sticks' boomerang, and Amy's hammer. A new addition to Fire & Ice is the addition of Fire and Ice elements, which apply both to the level environments and character abilities. For example, Sonic can infuse himself with Fire to break ice blocks or surround himself with Ice in order to freeze water, alternating between the two at will. The game also features various special stages, bonus minigames, challenge rooms, and local multiplayer modes.

== Plot ==
Discovering an element known as Ragnium, Doctor Eggman begins harnessing it for himself, using it to create robots that can allegedly outrun Sonic and his friends while also damaging the environment in the process. Meanwhile, D-Fekt, a rejected robot Eggman created to search for Ragnium, starts using his magnetic powers to try to become more powerful. Sonic and his friends attempt to stop Eggman and D-Fekt and restore balance to the environment.

According to Bill Freiberger, executive producer of the Sonic Boom TV series, the game takes place during its second season, and features many teasers for that season within its bonus content. The season 2 episode "Return to Beyond the Valley of the Cubots" ties into the events of Fire & Ice, featuring the return of D-Fekt, and is even written by the game's writers.

== Development ==
Fire & Ice was first announced on June 9, 2015. Sega producer Omar Woodley has stated both Sega and developer Sanzaru Games had been learning from their mistakes with Shattered Crystal, which received poor reviews upon release. One of the problems they identified was how, even though the game was targeted towards children aged 7–11, fans of classic Sonic games picked up the game and had a harder time getting into Shattered Crystal's lengthy exploration-based levels. As such, levels have been made shorter and include paths to better suit gamers who prefer speeding through levels, in addition to explorational elements. On September 15, 2015, Sega announced that Fire & Ice, which was planned for a release in Fall 2015, would be delayed to 2016 to allow more development time and coincide with the series' 25th anniversary. Sega announced that the game would launch with a special edition containing a DVD featuring three episodes from the cartoon. A playable demo was shown at E3 2016.

== Reception ==
Reception

Aggregate scores
Aggregator	Score
Metacritic	62/100
OpenCritic	14% recommend

Review scores
Publication	Score
Destructoid	7/10
Game Informer	7/10
IGN	7.5/10
Nintendo Life	6/10
Nintendo World Report	7/10

Fire & Ice received mixed reviews, but still significantly more positive compared to Shattered Crystal and Rise of Lyric. The game holds a score of 62/100, indicating "mixed or average" reviews, according to review aggregator website Metacritic. Fellow review aggregator OpenCritic assessed that the game received weak approval, being recommended by only 14% of critics. Critics praised the improvements over Rise of Lyric and Shattered Crystal and refocus on speed–a key gameplay element of the franchise–while criticizing the plot, music, simple difficulty and, to a lesser extent, graphics.

Brian Shea of Game Informer gave the game a 7/10, stating: "Fire & Ice is a big step in the right direction for the spin-off series. While it still has quirks, it's a fun, easy experience that anyone can play. Though I still vastly prefer the classic Sonic games, Fire & Ice is an enjoyable spinoff title that brings some great elements of those games back into the forefront."

IGN's Jared Petty, who gave the game a 7.5/10, wrote: "A fast, fun platformer that lets you play the way you want. Sonic games have often struggled with providing the speed and excitement implied by the series' namesake hedgehog while also accommodating meaningful and rewarding exploration, but Sonic Boom: Fire and Ice admirably accomplishes both goals in old-school 2D-platformer fashion. You can blaze through, but at almost any moment you're free to veer off and indulge your curiosity by discovering hidden challenges and collectibles. While Fire and Ice's art direction and music are woefully generic, the well-constructed level layouts create a solid arcade-style experience that accomplishes a sense of extraordinary speed while accommodating a reasonable degree of control. Sonic Boom successfully draws from much of what makes the best of classic Sonic game play satisfying, sprinkles in a better-conceived exploratory structure, and remixes it into an intelligent, cohesive, and rewarding package."
