= Knowledge is Power (video game) =

2017 video game

- Developer: Wish Studios
- Publisher: Sony Interactive Entertainment
- Platform: PlayStation 4
- Release: 24 October 2017
- Genre: Party
- Mode: Multiplayer

Knowledge is Power is a 2017 party video game developed by British company Wish Studios and published by Sony Interactive Entertainment for the PlayStation 4. It was released as part of the PlayLink lineup.

Smartphones or tablets are used to play the game via a companion app, which connects to the PlayStation 4 through the host Wi-Fi network.

== Gameplay ==
Knowledge is Power is a fastest finger trivia game for 2-6 players where players use their smart devices as game controllers. Set in a fictional stop-motion animated game show, players choose from eight puppet characters, which they personalize with a selfie and battle it out to become the first to the top of the "Pyramid of Knowledge". An image processing technique called "Generalized Generative Genitals" prevents the uploading of lewd photos. Each play-through consists of three battle rounds, two challenge rounds and a finale.

The battle rounds consist of three multiple choice trivia questions. Players vote for each question's topic - the opener from a selection of four general knowledge categories – and subsequent ones from a selection of categories related to the subject matter of the previous question. In this way, each play-through is unique, with the subject matter determined by player consensus. The challenge rounds consist of one linking challenge – connecting related facts such as sports teams to their corresponding cities – and one sorting challenge – grouping sets of answers under two categories such as Harry Potter spell or Music Artist. The finale is a fastest finger general knowledge quiz played out at the pinnacle of a stepped pyramid, in which the objective is to be the first to the top. Each step is attributed a Power Play and players' starting positions are staggered by their points totals entering the finale. The winner is presented with a "scroll of knowledge", an obscure fact sent to their smartphone.

Integral to Knowledge Is Power is a 'Power Play' system, with which, prior to every question, players can select either a strategic advantage for themselves, for example removing potential wrong answers from their answering screen, or to send a prank to an opponent's screen to potentially hinder their ability to answer the question. For example, ‘Freeze’ encases the chosen target's answers in ice, and the recipient is forced to repeatedly tap their screens to free the answers before one can be submitted.

== Reception ==
Knowledge is Power received a Metacritic rating of 71%.

It was generally praised for its aesthetic and use of PlayLink technology. Liam Martin for the Daily Express states "the colourful presentation, silly characters and claymation art style screams fun, and the smartphone controls are more suited to non gamers", but goes on to criticise the game's pacing "it's just a shame there's not enough actual quizzing going on". In his review for Push Square, Sam Brooke called Knowledge Is Power "a solid, fun quiz game for when you've got friends or family around" but "there's too much waiting ... and not enough actual quizzing going on". Tyler Robertson for Hardcore Gamer writes: "Knowledge Is Power is a classic trivia game with a wide breadth of topics ... it has some quirks, but ... is a fun game that will get you and your friends fighting for the title of 'Master of Useless Facts'."

Knowledge is Power was nominated for Best Casual Game at The Independent Game Developers' Association Awards, and for Best Family/Social Game at the Titanium Awards.

Developed by key members of the team behind Relentless Software's BAFTA-winning Buzz! quiz franchise, Knowledge is Power has been described as its 'spiritual successor'.
