= Sonic Boom: Shattered Crystal =

2014 video game

- North American box art
- Developer: Sanzaru Games
- Publisher: Sega
- Directors: Bill Spence; Tin Guerrero
- Producer: Jenny Huang
- Designers: Mat Kraemer; John Hsia
- Programmers: Jon Gilardi; Paul Murray
- Artists: Jeremy French; JF Lepine
- Writers: Ken Pontac; Warren Graff; Tin Guerrero
- Composer: Richard Jacques
- Series: Sonic the Hedgehog
- Platform: Nintendo 3DS
- Release: NA: November 11, 2014; EU: November 21, 2014; AU: November 29, 2014; JP: December 18, 2014
- Genres: Platform, action-adventure
- Mode: Single-player

Sonic Boom: Shattered Crystal (Note: Released in Japan as Sonic Toon: Island Adventure (Japanese: ソニックトゥーン アイランドアドベンチャー, Hepburn: Sonikku Tūn: Airando Adobenchā)) is a 2014 platform game developed by Sanzaru Games and published by Sega for the Nintendo 3DS. Along with its Wii U sibling Sonic Boom: Rise of Lyric, Shattered Crystal is a spin-off of Sega's Sonic the Hedgehog franchise and is a part of the Sonic Boom sub-franchise, which also consists of an animated television series, whose games serve as its prequels. The two games together formed the third and final part in Sega's exclusivity agreement with Nintendo, following Sonic Lost World and Mario & Sonic at the Sochi 2014 Olympic Winter Games in 2013.

== Gameplay ==
Tails swings from an Enerbeam.

Shattered Crystal is largely a side-scrolling platform game, which features a stronger emphasis on exploration compared to previous Sonic titles. Through the course of the game, players gain access to four playable characters—Sonic, Tails, Knuckles, and Sticks—and can instantly switch between them during gameplay. Each character is able to use a homing attack to home in on enemies and an Enerbeam which lets them swing across gaps and remove enemy shields. Each character also has unique skills required to access certain parts of each stage. Sonic is able to perform a mid-air dash which can break blue barriers, Tails can fly up air currents and use various gadgets such as submarines, Knuckles can climb on walls and burrow underground, and Sticks can throw a boomerang that can be controlled mid-flight. Throughout each stage, players can locate crystal shards, required to progress through the game, as well as parts that can be used to buy upgrades.

== Plot ==
The game's backstory is explained in a comic tie-in included in the game: millennia ago, the evil serpentine cyborg, Lyric the Last Ancient, attempted to conquer the world using a powerful crystal. However, his fellow Ancients destroyed the crystal and detained him in stasis. In the present day, Lyric escapes from his imprisonment and begins searching for the lost fragments of the crystal to obtain ultimate power. While working, Lyric is confronted by Shadow, whom he captures using a mind-controlling device. Meanwhile, after rescuing Sticks from a rockslide, Amy enters a set of ancient ruins to collect research. She finds a secret ancient language and manuscript detailing the history and whereabouts of the crystal, but while trying to decipher it, she is ambushed by Lyric, leading to the game's opening scene. When Amy disengages to contact Sonic, Lyric, taking advantage of the distraction, incapacitates and captures her.

Together with Tails, Knuckles, and Sticks, Sonic traces Amy's footsteps in hopes of saving her from Lyric's clutches. Along the way, they encounter Shadow, whom Sonic proceeds to defeat in a race, freeing him from Lyric's control; Shadow then sets out to avenge his enslavement. Meanwhile, Lyric interrogates Amy to get the translation of the manuscripts she found. Sonic and company eventually catch up with them and rescue Amy before confronting Lyric aboard his airship. Refusing to concede defeat, Lyric attempts to destroy them with an experimental weapon, but Shadow intervenes and sends Lyric falling to his death through a floor hatch that Sonic opens. As Sticks makes a long, disorganized speech about teamwork, Shadow goes his own separate way. Sonic and his friends return home as Sonic and Knuckles argue over whether their group is named "Team Sonic" or "Team Knuckles".

== Development ==
Sonic Boom features a cast redesigned for Western audiences. From left to right: Sticks, Knuckles, Sonic, Amy Rose, and Tails.

On May 17, 2013, Sega announced a worldwide agreement with Nintendo for the next three games in Sega's Sonic the Hedgehog series to be developed exclusively for Nintendo devices. This included Sonic Lost World and Mario & Sonic at the Sochi 2014 Olympic Winter Games. On February 6, 2014, Sega announced Sonic Boom as the official title for Wii U and Nintendo 3DS, a general name encompassing both Shattered Crystal and the Wii U game Sonic Boom: Rise of Lyric.

The game was developed as part of a new Sonic Boom franchise, which also includes Rise of Lyric, another game also for the Nintendo 3DS, a television series, a comic series by Archie Comics, and a toyline by Tomy. The concepts for the video games were developed after those for the TV series. The franchise was designed for Western audiences, and the two games serve as prequels to the television series. Sega announced that the game would feature Sonic's traditional speed alongside a new exploratory game mechanic called "Enerbeam". Sega of America's marketing director Marchello Churchill explained that the new franchise was not designed to "replace modern Sonic". The Western developer's CEO explained that Sonic Boom's Sonic is "very different ... both in tone and art direction". Sega outsourced both games to Western developers in order to increase the game's appeal in Western markets, culminating in a separate westernized Sonic sub-series. They remain a separate continuity from the main series, and were originally not intended to be released in Japan, although a Japanese release was later announced under the name Sonic Toon (ソニックトゥーン, Sonikku Tūn). Despite most elements of the games being new, their music was composed by Richard Jacques, who had also scored previous Sonic games, including Sonic 3D Blast, Sonic R, and Sonic & All-Stars Racing Transformed.

San Francisco-based game studio Sanzaru Games developed Shattered Crystal under supervision by Sonic Team and long-time Sonic game designer Takashi Iizuka. As well as possessing different gameplay styles and stories, the two games were designed with different aesthetics, particularly in their environments and enemies.

== Reception ==
Reception

Aggregate score
Aggregator	Score
Metacritic	47/100

Review scores
Publication	Score
Destructoid	2.5/10
Eurogamer	4/10
GamesRadar+	2.5/5
IGN	4/10
Nintendo Life	6/10
Nintendo World Report	5/10
Slant Magazine	2/5

Unlike with previous games, Sega did not provide reviewers with advance copies of either Shattered Crystal or Rise of Lyric; they could only begin reviewing once the game was on sale. Like Rise of Lyric, Shattered Crystal was poorly received, but had slightly more positive reviews than Rise of Lyric's with many critics calling it an improvement. The game received "generally unfavorable" reviews, according to video game review aggregator Metacritic.

Chris Carter of Destructoid was very critical of the game, feeling that while Rise of Lyric had "some redeeming qualities," the same could not be said for Shattered Crystal. He criticized numerous aspects of the game such as the "sluggish pace," "terrible dialogue," and mostly the repetitive gameplay. He concluded the review by stating "Rather than let you actually play, Shattered Crystal is content to make you wait, wait, and wait some more before you get to the decent (but flawed) platforming. The design is maddening, especially when coupled with the poor dialogue compliments of the new Boom universe."

Scott Thompson of IGN found the gameplay linear and "simplistic" whilst also criticizing the slow pace of the gameplay calling it "monotonous." They also found the story "poorly written" and found the humour to be "painfully unfunny." They concluded their review by stating that the game was "a mess of gameplay styles that never feel comfortable with each other" and deemed it as "a slog that never finds its footing." Becky Cunningham of GamesRadar was more forgiving of the game, opining that the game "offers some fun platforming and treasure hunting moments, but its tedious mazes and poor story ultimately make it a drag."

On May 11, 2015, Sega announced that Rise of Lyric and Shattered Crystal had sold 620,000 copies in total across both platforms, making them some of the lowest-selling games in the franchise.

== See also ==
- List of video games notable for negative reception
- Mario & Sonic at the Sochi 2014 Olympic Winter Games
- Mario & Sonic at the Rio 2016 Olympic Games
- Sonic Boom (TV series)
- Sonic Lost World
- Sonic Boom: Rise of Lyric
- Sonic Boom: Fire & Ice
