= Sonic Boom: Rise of Lyric =

2014 video game

- North American cover art
- Developer: Big Red Button (Note: With additional assistance by Illfonic and Crytek)
- Publisher: Sega
- Director: Bob Rafei
- Producers: Lisa Kapitsas; Stephen Frost
- Designers: Brian McInerny; Christian Senn
- Programmer: Jeff Lander
- Artist: Adam Yeager
- Writers: John Melchior; Christian Cantamessa
- Composer: Richard Jacques
- Series: Sonic the Hedgehog
- Engine: CryEngine
- Platform: Wii U
- Release: NA: November 11, 2014; EU: November 21, 2014; AU: November 29, 2014; JP: December 18, 2014
- Genres: Action-adventure, platform
- Mode: Single-player

Sonic Boom: Rise of Lyric (Note: Japanese: ソニックトゥーン 太古の秘宝, Hepburn: Sonikku Tūn: Taiko no Hihō; lit. 'Sonic Toon: Ancient Treasure') is a 2014 action-adventure game developed by Big Red Button and published by Sega for the Wii U. Along with Sonic Boom: Shattered Crystal and Sonic Boom: Fire & Ice for the Nintendo 3DS, it is a spin-off of Sega's Sonic the Hedgehog series and part of the Sonic Boom franchise, which consists of an animated television series, a comic series by Archie Comics and a toyline by Tomy. The story follows Sonic, Tails, Knuckles and Amy, who must stop Lyric, the last Ancient, from acquiring the Chaos Crystals, while battling Doctor Eggman, Metal Sonic, and Shadow.

Sonic Boom: Rise of Lyric began development in 2011 under the title Sonic Origins and later Sonic Synergy. Originally intended to be a Jak and Daxter-style game focused on four-player gameplay for release on PC and other consoles, development moved to the Wii U as part of a three-game exclusivity deal Sega signed with Nintendo. Since CryEngine was not designed to run on the Wii U, many gameplay concepts were removed or simplified, while the story was rewritten due to Sega giving the Sonic Boom TV writers control of the game's scenario. Richard Jacques, the lead composer for Sonic 3D Blast (1996) and Sonic R (1997), composed the soundtrack.

Sonic Boom: Rise of Lyric was released in North America, Europe and Australia in November 2014, and the following month in Japan as Sonic Toon. It received overwhelmingly negative reviews from critics for its controls, camera system, combat, story, gameplay, dialogue, and technical problems. It is widely regarded as one of the worst Sonic games in the franchise's history, as well as one of the worst games of 2014. Additionally, it was a commercial failure, with the combined sales of Rise of Lyric and Shattered Crystal totaling 620,000 copies by March 31, 2015, making them among the worst-selling games in the franchise. Following its failure, Big Red Button would nearly shut down before transitioning to VR games.

== Gameplay ==
An example of gameplay in Rise of Lyric

Sonic Boom: Rise of Lyric is an action-adventure game with a stronger emphasis on exploration and combat than previous Sonic the Hedgehog installments, featuring four main characters whom players control: Sonic, Tails, Knuckles, and Amy. Gameplay is divided into four main styles: fast-paced platforming stages similar to the main series Sonic games, high-speed tracks where players must quickly avoid obstacles, slower stages with an emphasis on exploration, and boss battles. All characters can perform various fighting actions and collect up to 100 rings (Note: If the player connects the game with Sonic Boom: Shattered Crystal for the Nintendo 3DS, an item is unlocked at the shop which increases the cap to 200 rings.) as well as scrap metal to upgrade various stats.

Each character has abilities and gameplay mechanics: Sonic can use his speed and homing attacks, Tails can fly and use various gadgets, Knuckles can burrow underground and climb on walls, and Amy can swing on poles with her hammer. They also possess the Enerbeam, a whip-like weapon that allows them to perform various actions, such as hanging from speeding rails, removing enemy shields, and solving puzzles. Players can switch between all four characters, although not all of them are available at all times. The game supports local two player co-operative play, as well as several mini games with up to four players simultaneously.

== Plot ==
Sonic Boom features re-designed characters for Western audiences. From left to right: Sticks (new character), Knuckles, Sonic, Amy and Tails.

While pursuing Doctor Eggman, Sonic, Tails, Knuckles, and Amy discover an ancient tomb with carvings of Sonic and Tails on the entrance. Though Amy stops him from opening the door, when Metal Sonic ambushes them, he opens the door and they escape. Inside, they encounter Lyric, an armored rattlesnake and the last surviving member of the Ancients. Lyric recognizes Sonic from the events of one thousand years ago and captures them, but Tails deactivates their restraints and turns them into Enerbeams for them to use.

After meeting Cliff, the group discovers that Lyric planned to use the Chaos Crystals to power an army of robots and kill organic life to replace it with robots, but was imprisoned by the Ancients after they learned of his plan; the group then sets out to retrieve the Chaos Crystals before Lyric can. At an abandoned research facility, they meet MAIA, a robot who rebelled against Lyric and assists them by creating a portal that allows Sonic and Tails to travel one thousand years back in time to retrieve a map showing the location of the Chaos Crystals. Shadow attacks them, but they defeat him and retrieve the map from Lyric's weapons facility before trapping him inside to be imprisoned by the Ancients.

Lyric reluctantly forms an alliance with Eggman, but after this fails, he turns on Eggman by programming Metal Sonic against him. The group defeats Metal Sonic and Eggman and retrieves the final Chaos Crystal, but Lyric and his robots ambush them and demand that they hand over the Crystals. Though Sonic refuses to give them up, Tails, Knuckles and Amy agree. Lyric's robots then attack Sonic, who seemingly dies after being buried under rubble. However, he recovers and the group heads to Lyric's lair to stop him. During the battle, Lyric reprograms the Enerbeams to capture the group, but Eggman ambushes Lyric and frees them. Sonic, with the help of his friends, then incapacitates Lyric and removes his technopathy device. The group celebrates, but unbeknownst to them, Eggman retrieves the device and uses it to revive Metal Sonic.

== Development ==
Los Angeles-based studio Big Red Button developed Rise of Lyric under supervision by Sonic Team and long-time Sonic game designer Takashi Iizuka. It was built on CryEngine and is centered on "combat and exploration". Sega outsourced to Western developers to increase the appeal in Western markets, culminating in a separate westernized Sonic franchise. The game concept came after the television series plan. Big Red Button was chosen due to the studio's adventure game portfolio and leader, Bob Rafei of the Crash Bandicoot, Uncharted, and Jak and Daxter series. Portions were co-developed by IllFonic, who assisted with some of the level design, art assets, and code. Level designer Chris Senn, whose only other project was the cancelled Sonic X-treme during his time at the Sega Technical Institute, stated that he joined Big Red Button to "get a chance to close the chapter of Sonic in [his] life."

Sonic Boom started development in 2011 as Sonic Origins, intended to be a Jak and Daxter-style game focused around four-player co-op multiplayer. The plot would have explained the origins of Sonic, with him and Doctor Eggman once being friends, only for Eggman to break their friendship after an incident related to time travel causes them both to have a feud. One of the "pillars" was to create a more "organic and natural world" with a cartoonish art style, which one developer said was not as apparent in the final game. Big Red Button experimented with more radical redesigns of the cast, before Sonic Team requested that they stay truer to their original appearances. Eventually, the development studio created a vertical slice over the course of two years to show to Sega of Japan, intended to be released on Steam, with releases on the PlayStation Store and Xbox Live if it sold well enough. The vertical slice was titled Sonic Synergy.

A screenshot from the Sonic Synergy phase of development; following the switch to the Wii U, the graphics would be significantly scaled back due to hardware limitations.

At around the time of Synergy, Sega had signed an exclusivity contract with Nintendo in which three Sonic games would be developed exclusively for Nintendo consoles, particularly the Wii U and Nintendo 3DS due to them having recently been released. This included Sonic Lost World and Mario & Sonic at the Sochi 2014 Olympic Winter Games, which released in 2013 after the announcement of the deal. In late 2012, Sega showcased the Synergy demo to Nintendo, who agreed to include it as part of the deal. Sega later announced the decision to switch to the Wii U in 2013, as well as mandating a 3DS port; the 3DS port eventually became Sonic Boom: Shattered Crystal, developed by Sanzaru Games. Sega of Japan also forced several changes, including rejecting the origin storyline.

Further problems arose when Rise of Lyric was ported to the Wii U due to Cry Engine 3 not being designed to run on the system; Big Red Button received help from Crytek to get it working. Several gameplay elements were also simplified due to time and budget constraints; the four-player cooperative aspect was reworked into a two-player game, while levels became more linear. At the same time, a separate Sonic television series was being produced, however eight months before release, Sega gave the producers full control over the game's setting and forced the developers to make further changes to the world; Knuckles was made more dimwitted, many filler cutscenes were added in an attempt to explain the story, and the Ancient's role in the story was reduced greatly. Towards the end of development in July 2014, upwards of 50 developers left the project due to their contracts not being renewed.

Other cut elements included Chao, a ring-banking system, and a biplane segment between Sky Citadel and Lyric's Lair. The game was renamed to Sonic Boom due to Sega wanting to make the brand global, and Synergy losing its original meaning by the end of development. British composer Richard Jacques composed the music. Jacques was selected for his experience with Sonic games including Sonic 3D Blast, Sonic R, and Sonic & All-Stars Racing Transformed.

== Release and marketing ==
After footage was shown off at the Game Developers Conference (GDC) 2013, Sega officially announced Sonic Boom on February 6, 2014. The franchise was designed for Western audiences and serves as a prequel to the television series. Sega of America's marketing director Marchello Churchill explained that the new franchise was not designed to "replace modern Sonic". The Western developer's CEO explained that Sonic Boom's Sonic is "very different ... both in tone and art direction", and that it is a separate continuity to the main series. Customers who had pre-ordered through Amazon.com in the US or UK would receive special lighting suits for the playable characters, with UK players receiving an additional T-shirt if they pre-ordered on Nintendo's online store.

Upon their reveal, the character designs received a polarized reception from audiences. Later on, pre-release demos featured at E3 2014 received mostly negative reception from journalists. Destructoid nominated Rise of Lyric for "Best Platformer" and "Best Nintendo Exclusive" for their "Best of E3" awards. In contrast, GameCentral wrote, "the very worst game in the line-up was Sega's Sonic Boom, which was so unspeakably awful we couldn't even force ourselves to play through the whole demo". Michael Cole of Nintendo World Report felt that the demo was most enjoyable during its combat sections, but criticized the frame drops during running sections, believing that Sonic fans looking for fast action will be disappointed.

Sonic Boom: Rise of Lyric released in North America on November 11, 2014, and in Europe on November 21. Although not initially intended to be released in Japan, it was later revealed that it would release on December 18, 2014, as Sonic Toon: Ancient Treasure. On the first day of the U.S. release, a glitch was discovered that allowed players to jump to infinite heights by pausing during Knuckles' jump, which could be used to bypass most of the game. Speedrunners managed to beat the game in under an hour using the glitch; one of the writers of the television series referenced an edited episode clip mocking the bug. In January 2015, a one gigabyte patch was released to fix problems including the Knuckles glitch.

== Reception ==
Reception

Aggregate scores
Aggregator	Score
GameRankings	33%
Metacritic	32/100

Review scores
Publication	Score
Destructoid	5/10
Eurogamer	2/10
Game Informer	4/10
GameSpot	2/10
GamesRadar+	2.5/5
IGN	4.3/10
Nintendo Life	4/10
Nintendo World Report	2/10
Hardcore Gamer	2.5/5
The Independent	2/5

Unlike previous games, Sega did not provide reviewers with advance copies of either Shattered Crystal or Rise of Lyric; they could only begin reviewing once it was on sale. Sonic Boom: Rise of Lyric received overwhelmingly negative reviews from critics. It has a Metacritic score of 32/100 and a GameRankings score of 33.15%, making them the lowest-scoring Sonic games on either site.

Reviewers criticized the numerous technical problems. Don Saas of GameSpot called the world "more bug-ridden than the tunnel from Indiana Jones and the Temple of Doom", highlighting sound effects not playing most of the time, being able to clip through various environments, and the game once crashing his Wii U. IGN was less negative, writing "Rise of Lyric isn't fundamentally broken or unplayable; it's just thoroughly disappointing and unpolished". The Independent also noted frame drops, regarding the whole game as rushed and unpolished. The gameplay was similarly poorly received for its "tedious" combat and low difficulty, although some praised the multiplayer minigames.

Reviewers panned the overall presentation. IGN felt that the characters were well animated, but that Rise of Lyric was "further dragged down by nearly every aspect of its presentation", particularly the overuse of the same character quotes for basic actions. Tim Turi of Game Informer wrote: "These guys won't shut up about how much they love rings. Dr. Eggman even spouts out groan-inducing, poorly-aged meme references, like 'Nailed it!' or 'That. Just. Happened.'" Destructoid felt that the characters and indoor environments looked good, but that the outdoor environments were half-finished. Common Sense Media gave the game one out of five, describing it as a "sub-par Sonic game" that "hits too many speed bumps".

David Jenkins from GameCentral considered Sonic Boom the worst game of 2014, saying that one of the few positives was that "it proves previews do give a relatively accurate impression of a game's final quality". Game Informer and Yahoo! similarly listed Sonic Boom: Rise of Lyric as among the worst games of 2014, while Nintendo Life listed it as the worst Sonic game in the series' history. Sega announced that both Sonic Boom games had sold a combined 620,000 copies as of March 31, 2015, making them among the lowest-selling in the franchise.

== Legacy ==
Due to the mass exodus of employees, Big Red Button would consider shutting down, before making a transition to developing VR games. In an interview with Polygon, Bob Rafei confessed that the project had suffered from major scope creep early in development and that it led to its later issues, something Sega of America producer Stephen Frost agreed with.

In July 2015, following the shutdown of Sega's San Francisco offices, CEO Haruki Satomi admitted in an interview with Famitsu that the release of Rise of Lyric had severely damaged their consumer's trust.
