= List of American films of 2019 =

This is a list of American films released in 2019.

== Box office ==
The highest-grossing American films released in 2019, by domestic box office gross revenue, are as follows:

Highest-grossing films of 2019
Rank	Title	Distributor	Domestic gross
1	Avengers: Endgame	Disney	$858,373,000
2	The Lion King	Disney	$543,638,043
3	Star Wars: The Rise of Skywalker	Disney	$515,202,542
4	Frozen 2	Disney	$477,373,578
5	Toy Story 4	Disney	$434,038,008
6	Captain Marvel	Disney	$426,829,839
7	Spider-Man: Far From Home	Sony	$390,532,085
8	Aladdin	Disney	$355,559,216
9	Joker	Warner Bros.	$335,477,657
10	Jumanji: The Next Level	Sony	$320,314,960

== January–March ==
Opening		Title	Production company	Cast and crew	Ref.
J A N U A R Y	4	Escape Room	Columbia Pictures / Original Film	Adam Robitel (director); Bragi F. Schut, Maria Melnik (screenplay); Taylor Russell, Logan Miller, Deborah Ann Woll, Tyler Labine, Jay Ellis, Nik Dodani, Yorick van Wageningen	
J A N U A R Y	4	Rust Creek	IFC Films / Lunacy Productions	Jen McGowan (director); Julie Lipson (screenplay); Hermione Corfield, Jay Paulson, Sean O'Bryan, Micah Hauptman	
J A N U A R Y	4	American Hangman	Hangman Justice Productions	Wilson Coneybeare (director/screenplay); Donald Sutherland, Vincent Kartheiser, Oliver Dennis, Paul Braunstein	
J A N U A R Y	11	A Dog's Way Home	Columbia Pictures	Charles Martin Smith (director); W. Bruce Cameron (screenplay); Bryce Dallas Howard, Edward James Olmos, Alexandra Shipp, Ashley Judd, Jonah Haur-King, Wes Studi	
J A N U A R Y	11	The Upside	STX Entertainment	Neil Burger (director); Jon Hartmere (screenplay); Bryan Cranston, Kevin Hart, Nicole Kidman	
J A N U A R Y	11	Replicas	Entertainment Studios	Jeffrey Nachmanoff (director); Chad St. John (screenplay); Keanu Reeves	
J A N U A R Y	15	After Darkness	Grindstone Entertainment Group	Batán Silva (director); Fernando Diez Barroso (screenplay); Natalia Dyer, Kyra Sedgwick, Tim Daly	
J A N U A R Y	18	Glass	Universal Pictures / Buena Vista International / Perfect World Pictures / Blinding Edge Pictures / Blumhouse Productions	M. Night Shyamalan (director/screenplay); James McAvoy, Bruce Willis, Samuel L. Jackson, Sarah Paulson, Anya Taylor-Joy, Spencer Treat Clark, Charlayne Woodard	
J A N U A R Y	18	Close	Netflix / Piccadilly Pictures	Vicky Jewson (director); Vicky Jewson, Rupert Whitaker (screenplay); Noomi Rapace, Sophie Nélisse, Indira Varma, Eoin Macken	
J A N U A R Y	18	The Standoff at Sparrow Creek	Cinestate	Henry Dunham (director/screenplay); James Badge Dale, Brian Geraghty	
J A N U A R Y	24	The Final Wish	Global Renaissance Entertainment Group	Timothy Woodward Jr. (director); Jeffrey Reddick, William Halfon, Jonathan Doyle (screenplay); Lin Shaye, Michael Welch, Melissa Bolona, Spencer Locke, Tony Todd, Kaiwi Lyman-Mersereau, Jonathan Daniel Brown, Jean Elie, Christopher Murray, Douglas Tait, Larry Poole	
J A N U A R Y	25	The Kid Who Would Be King	20th Century Fox / Working Title Films	Joe Cornish (director/screenplay); Louis Ashbourne Serkis, Dean Chaumoo, Tom Taylor, Rhianna Doris, Angus Imrie, Rebecca Ferguson, Patrick Stewart	
J A N U A R Y	25	Serenity	Aviron Pictures / Global Road Entertainment	Steven Knight (director/screenplay); Matthew McConaughey, Anne Hathaway, Jason Clarke, Diane Lane, Djimon Hounsou	
J A N U A R Y	25	I Am Mother	Netflix	Grant Sputore (director), Michael Lloyd Green (screenplay/story), Clara Rugaard, Rose Byrne, Hilary Swank	
J A N U A R Y	30	The Vast of Night	GED Cinema	Andrew Patterson (director), James Montague, Craig W. Sanger (writers); Sierra McCormick, Jake Horowitz	
F E B R U A R Y	1	Miss Bala	Columbia Pictures	Catherine Hardwicke (director); Gareth Dunnet-Alcocer (screenplay); Gina Rodriguez, Ismael Cruz Córdova, Anthony Mackie	
F E B R U A R Y	1	Velvet Buzzsaw	Netflix	Dan Gilroy (director/screenplay); Jake Gyllenhaal, Rene Russo, Toni Collette, Zawe Ashton, Tom Sturridge, Natalia Dyer, Daveed Diggs, Billy Magnussen, John Malkovich	
F E B R U A R Y	3	O.G	HBO Films / Great Curve Films / Brookstreet Pictures	Madeleine Sackler (director); Stephen Belber (screenplay); Jeffrey Wright, William Fichtner, Boyd Holbrook, Mare Winningham, David Patrick Kelly, Yul Vazquez, Bahni Turpin, Ryan Cutrona, Ato Essandoh, Yolonda Ross, Kevin Jackson, Theothus Carter, Milan Blakely	
F E B R U A R Y	8	The Lego Movie 2: The Second Part	Warner Bros. Pictures / Warner Animation Group	Mike Mitchell (director); Phil Lord, Christopher Miller (screenplay); Chris Pratt, Elizabeth Banks, Tiffany Haddish, Will Arnett, Stephanie Beatriz, Charlie Day, Alison Brie, Nick Offerman, Maya Rudolph	
F E B R U A R Y	8	What Men Want	Paramount Pictures / Paramount Players / Will Packer Productions	Adam Shankman (director); Tina Gordon Chism (screenplay); Taraji P. Henson, Tracy Morgan, Max Greenfield, Aldis Hodge, Wendi McLendon-Covey	
F E B R U A R Y	8	Cold Pursuit	Summit Entertainment / StudioCanal	Hans Petter Moland (director); Frank Baldwin (screenplay); Liam Neeson, Tom Bateman, Tom Jackson, Emmy Rossum, Domenick Lombardozzi, Julia Jones, John Doman, Laura Dern	
F E B R U A R Y	8	High Flying Bird	Netflix / Extension 765	Steven Soderbergh (director); Tarell Alvin McCraney (screenplay); André Holland, Zazie Beetz, Melvin Gregg, Sonja Sohn, Zachary Quinto, Kyle MacLachlan, Bill Duke	
F E B R U A R Y	8	The Prodigy	Orion Pictures / XYZ Films	Nicholas McCarthy (director); Jeff Buhler (screenplay); Taylor Schilling, Peter Mooney, Colm Feore	
F E B R U A R Y	13	Isn't It Romantic	Warner Bros. Pictures / New Line Cinema / Bron Creative	Todd Strauss-Schulson (director); Erin Cardillo, Dana Fox, Katie Silberman (screenplay); Rebel Wilson, Liam Hemsworth, Adam DeVine, Priyanka Chopra, Betty Gilpin, Brandon Scott Jones	
F E B R U A R Y	13	Happy Death Day 2U	Universal Pictures / Blumhouse Productions	Christopher Landon (director/screenplay); Jessica Rothe, Israel Broussard, Phi Vu, Suraj Sharma, Sarah Yarkin, Ruby Modine, Rachel Matthews, Charles Aitken, Steve Zissis	
F E B R U A R Y	14	Alita: Battle Angel	20th Century Fox / Lightstorm Entertainment	Robert Rodriguez (director); James Cameron, Laeta Kalogridis (screenplay); Rosa Salazar, Christoph Waltz, Jennifer Connelly, Mahershala Ali, Ed Skrein, Jackie Earle Haley, Keean Johnson, Leonard Wu	
F E B R U A R Y	22	How to Train Your Dragon: The Hidden World	Universal Pictures / DreamWorks Animation	Dean DeBlois (director/screenplay); Jay Baruchel, America Ferrera, Cate Blanchett, Craig Ferguson, F. Murray Abraham	
F E B R U A R Y	22	Fighting with My Family	Metro-Goldwyn-Mayer	Stephen Merchant (director/screenplay); Florence Pugh, Lena Headey, Nick Frost, Jack Lowden, Vince Vaughn, Dwayne Johnson	
M A R C H	1	A Madea Family Funeral	Lionsgate	Tyler Perry (director); Jason Rogers (screenplay); Tyler Perry, Courtney Burrell, Patrice Lovely	
M A R C H	1	Greta	Focus Features	Neil Jordan (director/screenplay); Ray Wright (screenplay); Isabelle Huppert, Chloë Grace Moretz, Maika Monroe, Colm Feore, Stephen Rea	
M A R C H	6	Triple Frontier	Netflix	J. C. Chandor (director/screenplay); Mark Boal (screenplay); Ben Affleck, Oscar Isaac, Charlie Hunnam, Garrett Hedlund, Pedro Pascal	
M A R C H	8	Captain Marvel	Marvel Studios	Anna Boden, Ryan Fleck (directors/screenplay); Geneva Robertson-Dworet (screenplay); Brie Larson, Samuel L. Jackson, Ben Mendelsohn, Djimon Hounsou, Lee Pace, Lashana Lynch, Gemma Chan, Annette Bening, Clark Gregg, Jude Law	
M A R C H	8	Gloria Bell	A24	Sebastián Lelio (director/screenplay); Alice Johnson Boher (screenplay); Julianne Moore, John Turturro, Michael Cera, Caren Pistorius, Brad Garrett, Jeanne Tripplehorn, Rita Wilson, Chris Mulkey, Sean Astin, Holland Taylor	
M A R C H	8	The Kid	Lionsgate	Vincent D'Onofrio (director); Andrew Lanham (screenplay); Ethan Hawke, Dane DeHaan, Jake Schur, Leila George, Adam Baldwin, Chris Pratt	
M A R C H	15	Wonder Park	Paramount Pictures / Paramount Animation / Nickelodeon Movies	Josh Appelbaum, Andre Nemec (screenplay); Brianna Denski, Ken Hudson Campbell, Matthew Broderick, Jennifer Garner, Kenan Thompson, Ken Jeong, Mila Kunis, John Oliver	
M A R C H	15	Nancy Drew and the Hidden Staircase	Warner Bros. Pictures / A Very Good Production	Katt Shea (director); Nina Fiore, John Herrera (screenplay); Sophia Lillis, Zoe Renee, Mackenzie Graham, Laura Slade Wiggins, Sam Trammell, Linda Lavin	
M A R C H	15	Captive State	Focus Features / Participant Media	Rupert Wyatt (director/screenplay); Erica Beeney (screenplay); John Goodman, Ashton Sanders, Jonathan Majors, Machine Gun Kelly, Vera Farmiga	
M A R C H	15	The Aftermath	Fox Searchlight Pictures	James Kent (director); Joe Shrapnel, Anna Waterhouse (screenplay); Alexander Skarsgård, Keira Knightley, Jason Clarke	
M A R C H	15	Five Feet Apart	Lionsgate / CBS Films	Justin Baldoni (director); Mikki Daughtry, Tobias Iaconis (screenplay); Cole Sprouse, Haley Lu Richardson	
M A R C H	15	The Highwaymen	Netflix	John Lee Hancock (director); John Fusco (screenplay); Kevin Costner, Woody Harrelson, Kathy Bates, John Carroll Lynch, Kim Dickens, Thomas Mann, William Sadler	
M A R C H	15	Red 11	Double R	Robert Rodriguez (director/screenplay); Racer Rodriguez (screenplay); Roby Attal, Lauren Hatfield, Alejandro Rose Garcia, Brently Heilbron, Katherine Willis, Carlos Gallardo	
M A R C H	15	Never Grow Old	Saban Films / Canal+ / Ciné+	Ivan Kavanagh (director/screenplay); Emile Hirsch, Tim Ahern, Déborah François, John Cusack, Danny Webb, Sam Louwyck	
M A R C H	15	Superpower Dogs	IMAX Entertainment	Daniel Ferguson (director/screenplay); Chris Evans	
M A R C H	19	Triple Threat	WWE Studios / TF1 Séries Films / Ingenious Media	Jesse V. Johnson (director); Dwayne Smith (screenplay); Tony Jaa, Iko Uwais, Tiger Chen, Scott Adkins, Yanin Vismitananda, Celina Jade, Michael Bisping, Michael Jai White	
M A R C H	22	Us	Universal Pictures / Monkeypaw Productions / Perfect World Pictures	Jordan Peele (director/screenplay); Lupita Nyong'o, Winston Duke, Shahadi Wright Joseph, Evan Alex, Elisabeth Moss, Tim Heidecker	
M A R C H	22	Hotel Mumbai	Thunder Road Pictures / Arclight Films	Anthony Maras (director/screenplay); John Collee (screenplay); Dev Patel, Armie Hammer, Nazanin Boniadi, Tilda Cobham-Hervey, Anupam Kher, Jason Isaacs	
M A R C H	22	The Dirt	Netflix	Jeff Tremaine (director): Tom Kapinos, Amanda Adelson, Rich Wilkes (screenplay); Douglas Booth, Iwan Rheon, Machine Gun Kelly, Daniel Webber	
M A R C H	22	Dragged Across Concrete	Summit Entertainment	S. Craig Zahler (director/screenplay); Mel Gibson, Vince Vaughn, Michael Jai White	
M A R C H	29	Dumbo	Walt Disney Pictures	Tim Burton (director); Ehren Kruger (screenplay); Colin Farrell, Michael Keaton, Danny DeVito, Eva Green, Nico Parker, Finley Hobbins, Alan Arkin, Roshan Seth, Lars Eidinger, DeObia Oparei	
M A R C H	29	The Beach Bum	Neon	Harmony Korine (director/screenplay); Matthew McConaughey, Zac Efron, Jonah Hill, Isla Fisher, Jimmy Buffett, Snoop Dogg, Martin Lawrence	
M A R C H	29	Unplanned	Pure Flix	Chuck Konzelman, Cary Soloman (director/screenplay); Ashley Bratcher, Brooks Ryan, Robia Scott	

== April–June ==
Opening		Title	Production company	Cast and crew	Ref.
A P R I L	5	Shazam!	Warner Bros. Pictures / New Line Cinema / DC Films	David F. Sandberg (director); Henry Gayden (screenplay); Zachary Levi, Asher Angel, Mark Strong, Jack Dylan Grazer, Djimon Hounsou	
A P R I L	5	Pet Sematary	Paramount Pictures / Room 101, Inc.	Kevin Kolsch, Dennis Widmyer (directors); Jeff Buhler (screenplay); Jason Clarke, Amy Seimetz, John Lithgow	
A P R I L	5	The Best of Enemies	STX Entertainment	Robin Bissell (director/screenplay); Taraji P. Henson, Sam Rockwell	
A P R I L	5	High Life	A24 / Arte / ZDF / Canal+ / Ciné+	Claire Denis (director/screenplay); Jean-Pol Fargeau (screenplay); Robert Pattinson, Juliette Binoche, André Benjamin, Mia Goth	
A P R I L	5	Unicorn Store	Netflix	Brie Larson (director); Samantha McIntyre (screenplay); Brie Larson, Samuel L. Jackson, Joan Cusack, Bradley Whitford, Mamoudou Athie, Mary Holland, Hamish Linklater	
A P R I L	5	The Haunting of Sharon Tate	Saban Films / Voltage Pictures	Daniel Farrands (director/screenplay); Hilary Duff, Jonathan Bennett, Lydia Hearst, Pawel Szajda	
A P R I L	5	The Wind	IFC Midnight	Emma Tammi (director); Teresa Sutherland (screenplay); Caitlin Gerard, Ashley Zukerman, Julia Goldani Telles, Miles Anderson	
A P R I L	6	Native Son	HBO Films / A24 / Bow + Arrow Entertainment	Rashid Johnson (director); Suzan-Lori Parks (screenplay); Ashton Sanders, Margaret Qualley, Nick Robinson, KiKi Layne, Bill Camp, Sanaa Lathan, Stephen McKinley Henderson, Lamar Johnson, Jerod Haynes, Barbara Sukowa, Elizabeth Marvel, David Alan Grier, Aaron Clifton Moten	
A P R I L	10	The Silence	Netflix	John R. Leonetti (director); Carey Van Dyke, Shane Van Dyke (screenplay); Kiernan Shipka, Stanley Tucci, Miranda Otto, John Corbett	
A P R I L	12	Hellboy	Lionsgate / Summit Entertainment / Millennium Media	Neil Marshall (director); Andrew Cosby (screenplay); David Harbour, Milla Jovovich, Ian McShane, Sasha Lane, Daniel Dae Kim, Sophie Okonedo, Penelope Mitchell, Thomas Haden Church	
A P R I L	12	Little	Universal Pictures / Legendary Pictures / Will Packer Productions	Tina Gordon (director); Camilla Blackett (screenplay); Issa Rae, Regina Hall, Marsai Martin	
A P R I L	12	Missing Link	Annapurna Pictures / Laika	Chris Butler (director/screenplay); Hugh Jackman, Zach Galifianakis, Zoe Saldaña, Emma Thompson, Stephen Fry, David Walliams, Timothy Olyphant, Matt Lucas, Amrita Acharia	
A P R I L	12	After	Aviron Pictures / Voltage Pictures	Jenny Gage (director/screenplay); Susan McMartin, Tamara Chestna (screenplay); Josephine Langford, Hero Fiennes Tiffin, Selma Blair, Inanna Sarkis, Shane Paul McGhie, Pia Mia, Khadijha Red Thunder, Dylan Arnold, Samuel Larsen, Jennifer Beals, Peter Gallagher	
A P R I L	12	Her Smell	Bow and Arrow Entertainment / Faliro House Productions	Alex Ross Perry (director/screenplay); Elisabeth Moss, Cara Delevingne, Dan Stevens, Agyness Deyn, Gayle Rankin, Ashley Benson, Dylan Gelula, Virginia Madsen, Amber Heard	
A P R I L	17	Breakthrough	20th Century Fox	Roxann Dawson (director); Grant Nieporte (screenplay); Chrissy Metz, Josh Lucas, Topher Grace, Mike Colter, Marcel Ruiz, Sam Trammell, Dennis Haysbert	
A P R I L	17	Penguins	Disneynature	Alastair Fothergill (director), Jeff Wilson (co-director); Ed Helms	
A P R I L	19	The Curse of La Llorona	Warner Bros. Pictures / New Line Cinema	Michael Chaves (director); Mikki Daughtry, Tobias Iaconis (screenplay); Linda Cardellini, Raymond Cruz, Patricia Velasquez	
A P R I L	19	Under the Silver Lake	A24	David Robert Mitchell (director/screenplay); Andrew Garfield, Riley Keough, Topher Grace	
A P R I L	19	Family	Stage 6 Films / Naegle Ink	Laura Steinel (director/screenplay); Taylor Schilling, Brian Tyree Henry, Bryn Vale, Allison Tolman, Kate McKinnon	
A P R I L	19	Fast Color	Codeblack Films	Julia Hart (director/screenplay); Jordan Horowitz (screenplay); Gugu Mbatha-Raw, Lorraine Toussaint, Saniyya Sidney, Christopher Denham, David Strathairn	
A P R I L	19	Someone Great	Netflix	Jennifer Kaytin Robinson (director/screenplay); Gina Rodriguez, Brittany Snow, DeWanda Wise	
A P R I L	23	I Spit on Your Grave: Deja Vu	Deja Vu LLC	Meir Zarchi (director/screenplay); Camille Keaton, Maria Olsen, Meir Zarchi	
A P R I L	26	Avengers: Endgame	Marvel Studios	Anthony and Joe Russo (directors); Christopher Markus and Stephen McFeely (screenplay); Robert Downey Jr., Chris Evans, Mark Ruffalo, Chris Hemsworth, Scarlett Johansson, Jeremy Renner, Don Cheadle, Paul Rudd, Brie Larson, Karen Gillan, Danai Gurira, Benedict Wong, Jon Favreau, Bradley Cooper, Gwyneth Paltrow, Josh Brolin	
A P R I L	26	I Trapped the Devil	IFC Midnight	Josh Lobo (director/screenplay); A. J. Bowen, Scott Poythress, Susan Burke, Jocelin Donahue, Chris Sullivan	
A P R I L	26	Body at Brighton Rock	SoapBox Films / ProtoStar Pictures	Roxanne Benjamin (director/screenplay); Karina Fontes, Casey Adams, Emily Althaus, Martin Spanjers, Susan Burke, John Getz	
A P R I L	27	Buffaloed	Lost City / Blue Ice Pictures	Tanya Wexler (director); Brian Sacca (screenplay); Zoey Deutch, Jermaine Fowler, Judy Greer, Jai Courtney	
M A Y	3	Long Shot	Lionsgate / Summit Entertainment / Good Universe / Point Grey Pictures	Jonathan Levine (director); Dan Sterling (screenplay); Seth Rogen, Charlize Theron, O'Shea Jackson Jr., Andy Serkis, June Diane Raphael, Bob Odenkirk, Alexander Skarsgård	
M A Y	3	The Intruder	Screen Gems	Deon Taylor (director); David Loughery (screenplay); Dennis Quaid, Michael Ealy, Meagan Good, Joseph Sikora	
M A Y	3	UglyDolls	STX Entertainment / Reel FX Animation Studios	Kelly Asbury (director); Alison Peck (screenplay); Kelly Clarkson, Pitbull, Nick Jonas, Wanda Sykes, Gabriel Iglesias, Blake Shelton, Janelle Monáe, Emma Roberts, Wang Leehom, Bebe Rexha, Charli XCX, Lizzo	
M A Y	3	Extremely Wicked, Shockingly Evil and Vile	Netflix / Sky Cinema	Joe Berlinger (director); Michael Werwie (screenplay); Zac Efron, Lily Collins, Kaya Scodelario, John Malkovich, Jeffrey Donovan, Angela Sarafyan, Dylan Baker, Brian Geraghty, Jim Parsons, Haley Joel Osment	
M A Y	3	The Last Summer	Netflix	William Bindley (director); Scott Bindley; William Bindley (screenplay); KJ Apa, Maia Mitchell, Jacob Latimore, Halston Sage and Tyler Posey	
M A Y	10	Pokémon Detective Pikachu	Warner Bros. Pictures / Legendary Entertainment / The Pokémon Company	Rob Letterman (director/screenplay); Dan Hernandez, Benji Samit, Derek Connolly (screenplay); Ryan Reynolds, Justice Smith, Kathryn Newton, Suki Waterhouse, Omar Chaparro, Chris Geere, Ken Watanabe, Bill Nighy	
M A Y	10	The Hustle	Metro-Goldwyn-Mayer	Chris Addison (director); Jac Schaeffer (screenplay); Anne Hathaway, Rebel Wilson, Alex Sharp, Dean Norris	
M A Y	10	Tolkien	Fox Searchlight Pictures / Chernin Entertainment	Dome Karukoski (director); David Gleeson, Stephen Beresford (screenplay); Nicholas Hoult, Lily Collins, Colm Meaney, Derek Jacobi	
M A Y	10	Poms	STX Entertainment / Sierra/Affinity	Zara Hayes (director/screenplay); Shane Atkinson (screenplay); Diane Keaton, Jacki Weaver, Pam Grier, Rhea Perlman, Celia Weston, Phyllis Somerville	
M A Y	10	The Professor and the Madman	Vertical Entertainment	P.B. Shemran (director, screenplay); Todd Komarnicki (screenplay); Mel Gibson, Sean Penn, Natalie Dormer, Eddie Marsan, Jennifer Ehle, David O'Hara, Ioan Gruffudd, Stephen Dillane, Steve Coogan	
M A Y	17	John Wick: Chapter 3 – Parabellum	Lionsgate / Summit Entertainment / Thunder Road Films	Chad Stahelski (director); Derek Kolstad (screenplay); Keanu Reeves, Halle Berry, Laurence Fishburne, Mark Dacascos, Asia Kate Dillon, Lance Reddick, Anjelica Huston, Ian McShane	
M A Y	17	A Dog's Journey	Universal Pictures / Amblin Entertainment / Walden Media	Gail Mancuso (director); W. Bruce Cameron, Cathryn Michon, Wally Wolodarsky, Maya Forbes (screenplay); Dennis Quaid, Josh Gad, Marg Helgenberger, Betty Gilpin, Kathryn Prescott, Henry Lau	
M A Y	17	The Sun Is Also a Star	Warner Bros. Pictures / Metro-Goldwyn-Mayer	Ry Russo-Young (director); Tracy Oliver (screenplay); Yara Shahidi, Charles Melton, John Leguizamo	
M A Y	17	The Professor	Open Road Films / Saban Films	Wayne Roberts (director/screenplay); Johnny Depp, Rosemarie DeWitt, Danny Huston, Zoey Deutch, Ron Livingston, Odessa Young	
M A Y	17	The Souvenir	A24	Joanna Hogg (director/screenplay); Honor Swinton Byrne, Tom Burke, Tilda Swinton, Richard Ayoade	
M A Y	22	The Tomorrow Man	Bleecker Street	Noble Jones (director, screenplay); John Lithgow, Blythe Danner, Derek Cecil, Katie Aselton, Sophie Thatcher, Eve Harlow	
M A Y	24	Aladdin	Walt Disney Pictures	Guy Ritchie (director/screenplay); John August (screenplay); Mena Massoud, Will Smith, Naomi Scott, Marwan Kenzari, Navid Negahban, Nasim Pedrad, Billy Magnussen, Numan Acar, Alan Tudyk, Frank Welker	
M A Y	24	Brightburn	Screen Gems / Stage 6 Films	David Yarovesky (director); Brian Gunn, Mark Gunn (screenplay); Elizabeth Banks, David Denman, Jackson A. Dunn, Matt Jones, Meredith Hagner	
M A Y	24	Booksmart	Annapurna Pictures / Gloria Sanchez Productions	Olivia Wilde (director); Emily Halpern, Sarah Haskins, Katie Silberman, Susanna Fogel (screenplay); Kaitlyn Dever, Beanie Feldstein, Jessica Williams, Noah Galvin, Billie Lourd, Lisa Kudrow, Will Forte, Jason Sudeikis	
M A Y	24	The Perfection	Netflix / Miramax	Richard Shepard (director/screenplay); Eric Charmelo, Nicole Snyder (screenplay); Allison Williams, Logan Browning, Steven Weber, Alaina Huffman	
M A Y	29	Always Be My Maybe	Netflix	Nahnatchka Khan (director); Ali Wong, Randall Park, Michael Golamco (screenplay); Ali Wong, Randall Park, Daniel Dae Kim, Keanu Reeves	
M A Y	31	Deadwood: The Movie	HBO Films / Red Board Productions / The Mighty Mint	Daniel Minahan (director); David Milch (screenplay); Timothy Olyphant, Ian McShane, Molly Parker, Paula Malcomson, W. Earl Brown, Dayton Callie, Kim Dickens, Brad Dourif, Anna Gunn, John Hawkes, Leon Rippy, William Sanderson, Robin Weigert, Brent Sexton, Sean Bridgers, Franklyn Ajaye, Gerald McRaney, Keone Young, Geri Jewell, Jeffrey Jones, Peter Jason, Cleo King, Tony Curran, Jade Pettyjohn, Don Swayze, Alan Ko, Garret Dillahunt, Larry Cedar	
M A Y	31	Godzilla: King of the Monsters	Warner Bros. Pictures / Legendary Entertainment	Michael Dougherty (director/screenplay); Zach Shields, Max Borenstein (screenplay); Kyle Chandler, Vera Farmiga, Millie Bobby Brown, Bradley Whitford, Sally Hawkins, Charles Dance, Thomas Middleditch, Aisha Hinds, O'Shea Jackson Jr., David Strathairn, Ken Watanabe, Zhang Ziyi	
M A Y	31	Rocketman	Paramount Pictures / Marv Films	Dexter Fletcher (director); Lee Hall (screenplay); Taron Egerton, Jamie Bell, Richard Madden, Bryce Dallas Howard	
M A Y	31	Ma	Universal Pictures / Blumhouse Productions	Tate Taylor (director/screenplay); Scotty Landes (screenplay); Octavia Spencer, Juliette Lewis, Diana Silvers, McKaley Miller, Corey Fogelmanis, Luke Evans	
J U N E	7	Dark Phoenix	20th Century Fox / Marvel Entertainment	Simon Kinberg (director/screenplay); James McAvoy, Michael Fassbender, Jennifer Lawrence, Nicholas Hoult, Sophie Turner, Tye Sheridan, Alexandra Shipp, Kodi Smit-McPhee, Evan Peters, Jessica Chastain	
J U N E	7	The Secret Life of Pets 2	Universal Pictures / Illumination	Chris Renaud (director); Jonathan del Val (co-director); Brian Lynch (screenplay); Patton Oswalt, Eric Stonestreet, Kevin Hart, Jenny Slate, Tiffany Haddish, Lake Bell, Nick Kroll, Dana Carvey, Ellie Kemper, Chris Renaud, Hannibal Buress, Bobby Moynihan, Harrison Ford	
J U N E	7	Late Night	Amazon Studios	Nisha Ganatra (director); Mindy Kaling (screenplay); Emma Thompson, Mindy Kaling, Max Casella, Hugh Dancy, John Lithgow, Denis O'Hare, Reid Scott, Amy Ryan	
J U N E	7	The Last Black Man in San Francisco	A24 / Plan B Entertainment	Joe Talbot (director/screenplay); Rob Richert (screenplay); Jimmie Fails, Jonathan Majors, Danny Glover, Tichina Arnold, Rob Morgan, Mike Epps, Finn Wittrock, Thora Birch	
J U N E	7	Changeland	Gravitas Ventures	Seth Green (director/screenplay); Breckin Meyer, Macaulay Culkin, Brenda Song, Clare Grant, Randy Orton	
J U N E	14	Men in Black: International	Columbia Pictures / Amblin Entertainment / Tencent Pictures	F. Gary Gray (director); Art Marcum and Matt Holloway (screenplay); Chris Hemsworth, Tessa Thompson, Kumail Nanjiani, Rebecca Ferguson, Rafe Spall, Les Twins, Emma Thompson, Liam Neeson	
J U N E	14	Shaft	Warner Bros. Pictures / New Line Cinema / Davis Entertainment	Tim Story (director); Kenya Barris, Alex Barnow (screenplay); Samuel L. Jackson, Jessie Usher, Richard Roundtree, Alexandra Shipp, Regina Hall, Matt Lauria, Titus Welliver, Method Man	
J U N E	14	The Dead Don't Die	Focus Features	Jim Jarmusch (director/screenplay); Bill Murray, Adam Driver, Tilda Swinton, Chloë Sevigny, Steve Buscemi, Caleb Landry Jones, Rosie Perez, Iggy Pop, Sara Driver, RZA, Selena Gomez, Carol Kane, Tom Waits	
J U N E	14	Murder Mystery	Netflix / Happy Madison Productions	Kyle Newacheck (director); James Vanderbilt (screenplay); Adam Sandler, Jennifer Aniston, Luke Evans, Gemma Arterton, Adeel Akhtar, Terence Stamp	
J U N E	14	Plus One	RLJE Films / Red Hour Productions / Studio71	Jeff Chan, Andrew Rhymer (director/screenplay); Maya Erskine, Jack Quaid, Beck Bennett, Rosalind Chao, Perrey Reeves, Ed Begley Jr.	
J U N E	14	Being Frank	The Film Arcade	Miranda Bailey (director); Glen Lakin (screenplay); Jim Gaffigan, Logan Miller, Samantha Mathis, Alex Karpovsky, Anna Gunn	
J U N E	21	Toy Story 4	Walt Disney Pictures / Pixar	Josh Cooley (director); Stephany Folsom, Andrew Stanton (screenplay); Tom Hanks, Tim Allen, Annie Potts, Tony Hale, Keegan-Michael Key, Jordan Peele, Madeleine McGraw, Christina Hendricks, Keanu Reeves, Ally Maki, Jay Hernandez, Lori Alan, Joan Cusack	
J U N E	21	Anna	Lionsgate / Summit Entertainment / EuropaCorp	Luc Besson (director); Luc Besson, Marc Shmuger (screenplay); Sasha Luss, Helen Mirren, Luke Evans, Cillian Murphy, Alexander Petrov	
J U N E	21	Child's Play	Orion Pictures / Bron Creative	Lars Klevberg (director); Tyler Burton Smith (screenplay); Aubrey Plaza, Gabriel Bateman, Brian Tyree Henry, Mark Hamill	
J U N E	26	Annabelle Comes Home	Warner Bros. Pictures / New Line Cinema	Gary Dauberman (director/screenplay); Mckenna Grace, Madison Iseman, Katie Sarife, Patrick Wilson, Vera Farmiga	
J U N E	28	Yesterday	Universal Pictures / Perfect World Pictures / Working Title Films	Danny Boyle (director); Richard Curtis (screenplay); Himesh Patel, Lily James, Ed Sheeran, Kate McKinnon	
J U N E	28	Ophelia	IFC Films	Claire McCarthy (director); Semi Chellas (screenplay); Daisy Ridley, Naomi Watts, Clive Owen, George MacKay, Tom Felton, Devon Terrell	
J U N E	28	Killers Anonymous	Lionsgate	Martin Owen (director/screenplay); Elizabeth Morris, Seth Johnson (screenplay); Tommy Flanagan, Rhyon Nicole Brown, Jessica Alba, Gary Oldman	

== July–September ==
Opening		Title	Production company	Cast and crew	Ref.
J U L Y	2	Spider-Man: Far From Home	Columbia Pictures / Marvel Studios	Jon Watts (director); Chris McKenna, Erik Sommers (screenplay); Tom Holland, Samuel L. Jackson, Zendaya, Cobie Smulders, Jon Favreau, J. B. Smoove, Jacob Batalon, Martin Starr, Marisa Tomei, Jake Gyllenhaal	
J U L Y	2	Escape Plan: The Extractors	Lionsgate / Summit Entertainment	John Herzfeld (director); John Herzfeld, Miles Chapman (screenplay); Sylvester Stallone, Curtis Jackson, Dave Bautista	
J U L Y	12	Midsommar	A24	Ari Aster (director/screenplay); Florence Pugh, Jack Reynor, William Jackson Harper, Vilhelm Blomgren, Will Poulter	
J U L Y	12	Stuber	20th Century Fox	Michael Dowse (director); Tripper Clancy (screenplay); Kumail Nanjiani, Dave Bautista, Iko Uwais, Natalie Morales, Betty Gilpin, Jimmy Tatro, Mira Sorvino, Karen Gillan	
J U L Y	12	Crawl	Paramount Pictures / Ghost House Pictures	Alexandre Aja (director); Shawn Rasmussen, Michael Rasmussen (screenplay); Kaya Scodelario, Barry Pepper	
J U L Y	12	Point Blank	Netflix / War Party	Joe Lynch (director); Adam G. Simon (screenplay); Frank Grillo, Anthony Mackie, Marcia Gay Harden, Teyonah Parris	
J U L Y	12	The Farewell	A24	Lulu Wang (director/screenplay); Awkwafina, Tzi Ma, Diana Lin, Zhao Shuzhen	
J U L Y	12	Darlin'	Dark Sky Films	Pollyanna Mcintosh (director/screenplay); Pollyanna McIntosh, Cooper Andrews, Nora-Jane Noone, Bryan Batt	
J U L Y	19	The Lion King	Walt Disney Pictures	Jon Favreau (director); Jeff Nathanson (screenplay); Donald Glover, Seth Rogen, Chiwetel Ejiofor, Alfre Woodard, Billy Eichner, John Kani, John Oliver, Beyoncé Knowles-Carter, James Earl Jones	
J U L Y	26	Once Upon a Time in Hollywood	Columbia Pictures / Heyday Films	Quentin Tarantino (director/screenplay); Leonardo DiCaprio, Brad Pitt, Margot Robbie, Emile Hirsch, Margaret Qualley, Timothy Olyphant, Julia Butters, Austin Butler, Dakota Fanning, Bruce Dern, Mike Moh, Luke Perry, Damian Lewis, Al Pacino, Kurt Russell	
J U L Y	26	Skin	A24 / Voltage Pictures	Guy Nattiv (director/screenplay); Jamie Bell, Danielle Macdonald, Daniel Henshall, Bill Camp, Louisa Krause, Mike Colter, Kylie Rogers, Vera Farmiga	
J U L Y	30	South of 8	Rosewood Five / MultiVisionnaire Pictures	Tony Olmos (director/screenplay); Brian Patrick Butler, George Jac, Jennifer Paredes, Kathryn Schott, Raye Richards, Luke Pensabene, Shane P. Allen, Michael C. Burgess	
J U L Y	31	The Red Sea Diving Resort	Netflix / Bron Studios	Gideon Raff (director/screenplay); Chris Evans, Haley Bennett, Michael K. Williams, Michiel Huisman, Alessandro Nivola, Greg Kinnear, Ben Kingsley	
A U G U S T	2	Hobbs & Shaw	Universal Pictures / Seven Bucks Productions	David Leitch (director); Chris Morgan, Drew Pearce (screenplay); Dwayne Johnson, Jason Statham, Idris Elba, Vanessa Kirby, Eiza González, Cliff Curtis, Helen Mirren	
A U G U S T	2	A Score to Settle	Minds Eye Entertainment	Shawn Ku (director); John Stuart Newman, Christian Swegal (screenplay); Nicolas Cage, Benjamin Bratt	
A U G U S T	2	The Operative	Vertical Entertainment	Yuval Adler (director/screenplay); Diane Kruger, Martin Freeman, Cas Anvar	
A U G U S T	9	Dora and the Lost City of Gold	Paramount Players / Nickelodeon Movies / Walden Media / MRC	James Bobin (director); Nicholas Stoller, Matthew Robinson (screenplay); Isabela Moner, Eugenio Derbez, Michael Peña, Eva Longoria, Temuera Morrison, Danny Trejo, Benicio del Toro	
A U G U S T	9	The Kitchen	Warner Bros. Pictures / New Line Cinema / Vertigo DC / Bron Studios	Andrea Berloff (director/screenplay); Melissa McCarthy, Tiffany Haddish, Elisabeth Moss, Domhnall Gleeson, James Badge Dale, Brian d'Arcy James, Margo Martindale, Common, Bill Camp	
A U G U S T	9	The Art of Racing in the Rain	20th Century Fox	Simon Curtis (director); Mark Bomback (screenplay); Milo Ventimiglia, Amanda Seyfried, Kathy Baker, Martin Donovan, Gary Cole, Kevin Costner	
A U G U S T	9	Scary Stories to Tell in the Dark	Lionsgate / CBS Films / Entertainment One	André Øvredal (director); Dan Hageman, Kevin Hageman (screenplay); Zoe Colletti, Michael Garza, Gabriel Rush, Austin Zajur, Natalie Ganzhorn, Austin Abrams, Dean Norris, Gil Bellows, Lorraine Toussaint	
A U G U S T	9	The Peanut Butter Falcon	Roadside Attractions	Tyler Nilson, Michael Schwartz (director/screenplay); Shia LaBeouf, Dakota Johnson, John Hawkes, Bruce Dern, Jon Bernthal, Thomas Haden Church	
A U G U S T	9	After the Wedding	Sony Pictures Classics	Bart Freundlich (director/screenplay); Michelle Williams, Julianne Moore, Billy Crudup, Abby Quinn	
A U G U S T	9	Light of My Life	Saban Films	Casey Affleck (director/screenplay); Casey Affleck, Anna Pniowsky, Tom Bower, Elisabeth Moss	
A U G U S T	14	The Angry Birds Movie 2	Sony Pictures Animation / Rovio Animation	Thurop Van Orman (director), John Rice (co-director); Peter Ackerman, Eyal Podell, Jonathon E. Stewart (screenplay); Jason Sudeikis, Josh Gad, Leslie Jones, Bill Hader, Rachel Bloom, Awkwafina, Sterling K. Brown, Eugenio Derbez, Danny McBride, Peter Dinklage	
A U G U S T	16	Good Boys	Universal Pictures / Good Universe / Point Grey Pictures	Gene Stupnitsky (director/screenplay); Lee Eisenberg (screenplay); Jacob Tremblay, Brady Noon, Keith L. Williams, Molly Gordon, Midori Francis, Will Forte, Lil Rel Howery, Retta	
A U G U S T	16	Blinded by the Light	Warner Bros. Pictures / New Line Cinema	Gurinder Chadha (director/screenplay); Paul Mayeda Berges, Sarfraz Manzoor (screenplay); Viveik Kalra, Kulvinder Ghir, Meera Ganatra, Nell Williams, Aaron Phagura, Dean-Charles Chapman	
A U G U S T	16	Where'd You Go, Bernadette	Annapurna Pictures	Richard Linklater (director/screenplay); Holly Gent, Vincent Palmo Jr. (screenplay); Cate Blanchett, Billy Crudup, Emma Nelson, Kristen Wiig, James Urbaniak, Judy Greer, Troian Bellisario, Zoë Chao, Laurence Fishburne	
A U G U S T	16	47 Meters Down: Uncaged	Entertainment Studios	Johannes Roberts (director/screenplay); Ernest Riera (screenplay); John Corbett, Nia Long, Sophie Nelisse, Corinne Foxx, Sistine Stallone, Brianne Tju, Davi Santos, Khylin Rhambo, Brec Bassinger	
A U G U S T	16	Gwen	BFI / Endor Productions	William McGregor (director/screenplay); Maxine Peake, Eleanor Worthington Cox, Richard Harrington, Mark Lewis Jones, Kobna Holdbrook-Smith	
A U G U S T	21	Ready or Not	Fox Searchlight Pictures	Matt Bettinelli-Olpin, Tyler Gillett (director); Guy Busick, R. Christopher Murphy (screenplay); Samara Weaving, Adam Brody, Mark O'Brien, Henry Czerny, Andie MacDowell	
A U G U S T	23	Angel Has Fallen	Lionsgate / Millennium Media	Ric Roman Waugh (director); Creighton Rothenberger, Katrin Benedikt (screenplay); Gerard Butler, Morgan Freeman, Jada Pinkett Smith, Nick Nolte, Lance Reddick, Danny Huston, Tim Blake Nelson	
A U G U S T	23	Brittany Runs a Marathon	Amazon Studios	Paul Downs Colaizzo (director/screenplay); Jillian Bell, Michaela Watkins, Utkarsh Ambudkar, Lil Rel Howery, Micah Stock	
A U G U S T	23	Overcomer	Sony Affirm	Alex Kendrick (director/screenplay); Stephen Kendrick (screenplay); Alex Kendrick, Priscilla Shirer, Ben Davies, Shari Rigby, Jack Sterner	
A U G U S T	23	Jacob's Ladder	Vertical Entertainment / LD Entertainment	David M. Rosenthal (director); Jeff Buhler, Sarah Thorp (screenplay); Michael Ealy, Jesse Williams, Nicole Beharie	
A U G U S T	23	Burn	Yale Productions / Hopscotch Films	Mike Gan (director/screenplay); Tilda Cobham-Hervey, Suki Waterhouse, Harry Shum Jr., Shiloh Fernandez, Josh Hutcherson	
A U G U S T	30	Official Secrets	IFC Films	Gavin Hood (director/screenplay); Gregory Bernstein, Sara Bernstein (screenplay); Keira Knightley, Matt Smith, Matthew Goode, Adam Bakri, Rhys Ifans, Ralph Fiennes	
A U G U S T	30	Don't Let Go	Blumhouse Productions / Briarcliff Entertainment	Jacob Aaron Estes (director); Jacob Aaron Estes (screenplay); Jacob Aaron Estes, Drew Daywalt (story); David Oyelowo, Storm Reid, Byron Mann, Mykelti Williamson	
A U G U S T	30	Itsy Bitsy	Shout! Studios	Micah Gallo (director); Jason Alvino, Byran Dick, Micah Gallo (screenplay); Bruce Davison, Denise Crosby, Elizabeth Roberts, Arman Darbo, Treva Etienne, Eileen Dietz, Grace Shen	
A U G U S T	30	The Fanatic	The Wonderfilm Media Corporation / Daniel Grodnik Productions	Fred Durst (director/screenplay), Dave Bekerman (screenplay); John Travolta, Devon Sawa, Ana Golja, Jacob Grodnik, James Paxton, Jeff Chase, Luis Da Silva	
S E P T E M B E R	3	Debunkers, Inc.	Envoy Pictures / Showtime Networks	Matthew Thompson (director/screenplay); Josh Pinkowski, Izzy Pollak, Blake Kevin Dwyer, Nicole DuBois, Ryan Andrews, Lauren Froderman, Cayla Green, Theresa Layne, Suzana Norberg	
S E P T E M B E R	6	It Chapter Two	Warner Bros. Pictures / New Line Cinema	Andy Muschietti (director); Gary Dauberman (screenplay); Bill Skarsgård, James McAvoy, Jessica Chastain, Bill Hader, Isaiah Mustafa, Jay Ryan, James Ransone, Andy Bean, Jaeden Martell, Wyatt Oleff, Jack Dylan Grazer, Finn Wolfhard, Sophia Lillis, Chosen Jacobs, Jeremy Ray Taylor	
S E P T E M B E R	6	Satanic Panic	RLJE Films / Fangoria / Aperture Ent.	Chelsea Stardust (director); Grady Hendrix (screenplay); Hayley Griffith, Ruby Modine, Arden Myrin, A. J. Bowen, Jordan Ladd, Rebecca Romijn, Jerry O'Connell, Hannah Stocking	
S E P T E M B E R	6	Strange but True	Lionsgate / CBS Films	Rowan Athale (director); Eric Garcia (screenplay); Amy Ryan, Nick Robinson, Margaret Qualley, Connor Jessup, Blythe Danner, Brian Cox, Greg Kinnear	
S E P T E M B E R	8	The Obituary of Tunde Johnson	Zgreen Entertainment	Ali LeRoi (director); Stanley Kalu (screenplay); Steven Silver, Nicola Peltz	
S E P T E M B E R	13	The Goldfinch	Warner Bros. Pictures / Amazon Studios	John Crowley (director); Peter Straughan (screenplay); Ansel Elgort, Oakes Fegley, Aneurin Barnard, Finn Wolfhard, Sarah Paulson, Luke Wilson, Jeffrey Wright, Nicole Kidman	
S E P T E M B E R	13	Hustlers	STX Entertainment	Lorene Scafaria (director/screenplay); Constance Wu, Jennifer Lopez, Julia Stiles, Keke Palmer, Lili Reinhart, Lizzo, Cardi B	
S E P T E M B E R	13	The Sound of Silence	IFC Films	Michael Tyburski (director/screenplay); Ben Nabors (screenplay); Rashida Jones, Peter Sarsgaard, Tony Revolori, Austin Pendleton	
S E P T E M B E R	13	Monos	Neon / Stela Cine / Participant Media	Alejandro Landes (director); Alejandro Landes, Alexis Dos Santos (screenplay); Julianne Nicholson, Moisés Arias	
S E P T E M B E R	13	Tall Girl	Netflix	Nzingha Stewart (director); Sam Wolfson (screenplay); Ava Michelle, Griffin Gluck, Luke Eisner, Sabrina Carpenter, Paris Berelc	
S E P T E M B E R	20	Ad Astra	20th Century Fox / Regency Enterprises / Plan B Entertainment	James Gray (director/screenplay); Ethan Gross (screenplay); Brad Pitt, Tommy Lee Jones, Ruth Negga, Liv Tyler, Donald Sutherland, John Ortiz, Lisa Gay Hamilton, Freda Foh Shen, Natasha Lyonne	
S E P T E M B E R	20	Downton Abbey	Focus Features / Perfect World Pictures / Carnival Films	Michael Engler (director); Julian Fellowes (screenplay); Hugh Bonneville, Jim Carter, Michelle Dockery, Elizabeth McGovern, Maggie Smith, Imelda Staunton, Penelope Wilton	
S E P T E M B E R	20	Rambo: Last Blood	Lionsgate / Millennium Media / Balboa Productions	Adrian Grunberg (director); Sylvester Stallone, Matt Cirulnick (screenplay); Sylvester Stallone, Adriana Barraza, Paz Vega, Yvette Monreal, Sergio Peris-Mencheta, Oscar Jaenada, Joaquín Cosío	
S E P T E M B E R	20	Bloodline	Blumhouse Productions / Momentum Pictures	Henry Jacobson (director); Avra Fox-Lerne, Henry Jacobson, Will Honley (screenplay); Seann William Scott, Mariela Garriga, Dale Dickey, Kevin Carroll	
S E P T E M B E R	20	Running with the Devil	Patriot Pictures	Jason Cabell (director/screenplay); Nicolas Cage, Laurence Fishburne	
S E P T E M B E R	22	Fractured	Netflix	Brad Anderson (director); Alan B. McElroy (screenplay); Sam Worthington, Lily Rabe, Stephen Tobolowsky	
S E P T E M B E R	27	Abominable	Universal Pictures / DreamWorks Animation / Pearl Studio	Jill Culton (director/screenplay); Todd Wilderman (co-director); Chloe Bennet, Albert Tsai, Tenzing Norgay Trainor, Eddie Izzard, Sarah Paulson	
S E P T E M B E R	27	The Laundromat	Netflix	Steven Soderbergh (director); Scott Z. Burns (screenplay); Meryl Streep, Gary Oldman, Antonio Banderas, Jeffrey Wright, Robert Patrick, David Schwimmer, Sharon Stone	
S E P T E M B E R	27	Judy	Roadside Attractions / LD Entertainment / Pathé / BBC Films / Ingenious Media	Rupert Goold (director); Tom Edge (screenplay); Renée Zellweger, Jessie Buckley, Finn Wittrock, Rufus Sewell, Michael Gambon	
S E P T E M B E R	27	Prey	Blumhouse Productions / Image Nation	Franck Khalfoun (director); David Coggeshall, Franck Khalfoun (screenplay); Logan Miller, Kristine Froseth	
S E P T E M B E R	27	10 Minutes Gone	Highland Film Group	Brian A. Miller (director); Kelvin Mao, Jeff Jingle (screenplay); Bruce Willis, Michael Chiklis	

== October–December ==
Opening		Title	Production company	Cast and crew	Ref.
O C T O B E R	4	Joker	Warner Bros. Pictures / Village Roadshow Pictures / DC Films	Todd Phillips (director/screenplay); Scott Silver (screenplay); Joaquin Phoenix, Robert De Niro, Zazie Beetz, Frances Conroy, Brett Cullen, Glenn Fleshler, Bill Camp, Shea Whigham, Marc Maron	
O C T O B E R	4	Lucy in the Sky	Fox Searchlight Pictures	Noah Hawley (director/screenplay); Brian C. Brown, Elliott DiGuiseppi (screenplay); Natalie Portman, Jon Hamm, Zazie Beetz, Dan Stevens, Colman Domingo, Ellen Burstyn	
O C T O B E R	4	Dolemite Is My Name	Netflix	Craig Brewer (director); Scott Alexander and Larry Karaszewski (screenplay); Eddie Murphy, Keegan-Michael Key, Mike Epps, Craig Robinson, Tituss Burgess, Da'Vine Joy Randolph, Wesley Snipes	
O C T O B E R	4	In the Tall Grass	Netflix	Vincenzo Natali (director/screenplay); Patrick Wilson, Harrison Gilbertson, Rachel Wilson	
O C T O B E R	4	Low Tide	A24 / DirecTV Cinema	Kevin McMullin (director/screenplay); Keean Johnson, Jaeden Martell, Alex Neustaedter, Kristine Froseth, Shea Whigham	
O C T O B E R	4	Wrinkles the Clown	Magnet Releasing	Michael Beach Nichols (director); Michael Beach Nichols, Christopher K. Walker (screenplay)	
O C T O B E R	8	Little Monsters	Neon / Hulu	Abe Forsythe (director/screenplay); Lupita Nyong'o, Alexander England, Josh Gad	
O C T O B E R	9	Mister America	Magnolia Pictures / Abso Lutely Productions / Williams Street	Eric Notarnicola (director/screenplay); Tim Heidecker, Gregg Turkington (screenplay); Tim Heidecker, Gregg Turkington	
O C T O B E R	11	Gemini Man	Paramount Pictures / Skydance Media / Jerry Bruckheimer Films	Ang Lee (director); David Benioff, Billy Ray, Darren Lemke (screenplay); Will Smith, Mary Elizabeth Winstead, Clive Owen, Benedict Wong	
O C T O B E R	11	The Addams Family	Metro-Goldwyn-Mayer / Bron Animation	Conrad Vernon, Greg Tiernan (directors); Matt Lieberman, Pamela Pettler (screenplay); Oscar Isaac, Charlize Theron, Chloë Grace Moretz, Finn Wolfhard, Nick Kroll, Snoop Dogg, Bette Midler, Allison Janney	
O C T O B E R	11	The King	Netflix / Plan B Entertainment	David Michôd (director/screenplay); Joel Edgerton (screenplay); Timothée Chalamet, Joel Edgerton, Sean Harris, Lily-Rose Depp, Robert Pattinson, Ben Mendelsohn	
O C T O B E R	11	Jexi	Lionsgate / CBS Films / Entertainment One	Jon Lucas, Scott Moore (directors/screenplay); Adam Devine, Rose Byrne, Alexandra Shipp, Ron Funches, Charlyne Yi, Wanda Sykes, Justin Hartley, Kid Cudi, Michael Peña	
O C T O B E R	11	Polaroid	Vertical / Dimension Films / Vertigo Entertainment	Lars Klevberg (director); Blair Butler (screenplay); Kathryn Prescott, Grace Zabriskie, Samantha Logan, Tyler Young, Javier Botet, Katie Stevens, Madelaine Petsch	
O C T O B E R	11	El Camino: A Breaking Bad Movie	Netflix / Sony Pictures Releasing	Vince Gilligan (director/screenplay); Aaron Paul, Jesse Plemons, Scott MacArthur, Scott Shepherd, Charles Baker, Matt Jones, Robert Forster	
O C T O B E R	18	Maleficent: Mistress of Evil	Walt Disney Pictures	Joachim Rønning (director); Linda Woolverton, Noah Harpster, Micah Fitzerman-Blue (screenplay); Angelina Jolie, Elle Fanning, Michelle Pfeiffer, Chiwetel Ejiofor, Sam Riley, Harris Dickinson, Ed Skrein, Imelda Staunton, Juno Temple, Lesley Manville	
O C T O B E R	18	Zombieland: Double Tap	Columbia Pictures	Ruben Fleischer (director); Rhett Reese, Paul Wernick, David Callaham (screenplay); Woody Harrelson, Jesse Eisenberg, Emma Stone, Abigail Breslin, Rosario Dawson, Zoey Deutch, Luke Wilson	
O C T O B E R	18	Jojo Rabbit	Fox Searchlight Pictures	Taika Waititi (director/screenplay); Roman Griffin Davis, Thomasin McKenzie, Scarlett Johansson, Taika Waititi, Rebel Wilson, Stephen Merchant, Alfie Allen, Sam Rockwell	
O C T O B E R	18	The Lighthouse	A24 / Regency Enterprises	Robert Eggers (director/screenplay); Max Eggers (screenplay); Willem Dafoe, Robert Pattinson	
O C T O B E R	18	Wounds	Hulu / Annapurna Pictures	Babak Anvari (director/screenplay); Armie Hammer, Dakota Johnson, Zazie Beetz	
O C T O B E R	25	Black and Blue	Screen Gems	Deon Taylor (director); Peter A. Dowling (screenplay); Naomie Harris, Tyrese Gibson, Frank Grillo, Mike Colter, Reid Scott, Beau Knapp	
O C T O B E R	25	The Current War	101 Studios / Lantern Entertainment	Alfonso Gomez-Rejon (director); Michael Mitnick (screenplay); Benedict Cumberbatch, Michael Shannon, Katherine Waterston, Tom Holland, Tuppence Middleton, Matthew Macfadyen, Nicholas Hoult	
O C T O B E R	25	Countdown	STX Entertainment	Justin Dec (director/screenplay); Elizabeth Lail, Peter Facinelli, Anne Winters, Talitha Bateman, Tichina Arnold, P. J. Byrne	
O C T O B E R	25	The Kill Team	A24	Dan Krauss (director); Nat Wolff, Alexander Skarsgård	
O C T O B E R	25	The Gallows Act II	Lionsgate / Blumhouse Productions	Chris Lofing, Travis Cluff (director/screenplay); Chris Milligan, Ema Horvath, Brittany Falardeau	
N O V E M B E R	1	Terminator: Dark Fate	Paramount Pictures / 20th Century Fox / Skydance Media / Tencent Pictures	Tim Miller (director); David S. Goyer, Justin Rhodes, Billy Ray (screenplay); Linda Hamilton, Arnold Schwarzenegger, Mackenzie Davis, Natalia Reyes, Gabriel Luna, Diego Boneta	
N O V E M B E R	1	Motherless Brooklyn	Warner Bros. Pictures	Edward Norton (director/screenplay); Edward Norton, Bruce Willis, Gugu Mbatha-Raw, Bobby Cannavale, Cherry Jones, Alec Baldwin, Willem Dafoe	
N O V E M B E R	1	The Irishman	Netflix / TriBeCa Productions	Martin Scorsese (director); Steven Zaillian (screenplay); Robert De Niro, Al Pacino, Joe Pesci, Ray Romano, Bobby Canavale, Anna Paquin, Stephen Graham, Stephanie Kurtzuba, Jesse Plemons, Harvey Keitel	
N O V E M B E R	1	Harriet	Focus Features	Kasi Lemmons (director/screenplay); Gregory Allen Howard (screenplay); Cynthia Erivo, Leslie Odom Jr., Joe Alwyn, Janelle Monáe	
N O V E M B E R	1	Arctic Dogs	Entertainment Studios Motion Pictures / Assemblage Entertainment	Aaron Woodley (director/screenplay); Bob Barlen, Cal Brunker (screenplay); Jeremy Renner, James Franco, Heidi Klum, Alec Baldwin, Omar Sy, Anjelica Huston, John Cleese	
N O V E M B E R	6	Marriage Story	Netflix	Noah Baumbach (director/screenplay); Scarlett Johansson, Adam Driver, Laura Dern, Alan Alda, Ray Liotta, Julie Hagerty, Merritt Wever	
N O V E M B E R	8	Doctor Sleep	Warner Bros. Pictures / Intrepid Pictures	Mike Flanagan (director/screenplay); Ewan McGregor, Rebecca Ferguson, Kyliegh Curran, Cliff Curtis, Carl Lumbly, Zahn McClarnon, Emily Alyn Lind, Bruce Greenwood, Jocelin Donahue	
N O V E M B E R	8	Last Christmas	Universal Pictures / Perfect World Pictures	Paul Feig (director), Emma Thompson, Bryony Kimmings (screenplay); Emilia Clarke, Henry Golding, Michelle Yeoh, Emma Thompson	
N O V E M B E R	8	Playing with Fire	Paramount Pictures / Paramount Players / Nickelodeon Movies / Walden Media	Andy Fickman (director); Dan Ewen, Matt Lieberman (screenplay); John Cena, Keegan-Michael Key, John Leguizamo, Brianna Hildebrand, Dennis Haysbert, Judy Greer	
N O V E M B E R	8	Let It Snow	Netflix	Luke Snellin (director); Laura Solon, Victoria Strouse, Kay Cannon (screenplay); Isabela Merced, Shameik Moore, Kiernan Shipka, Odeya Rush, Liv Hewson, Mitchell Hope, Jacob Batalon, Joan Cusack	
N O V E M B E R	8	Midway	Lionsgate / Summit Entertainment / Centropolis Entertainment / AGC Studios / Entertainment One	Roland Emmerich (director); Wes Tooke (screenplay); Ed Skrein, Patrick Wilson, Luke Evans, Aaron Eckhart, Nick Jonas, Mandy Moore, Dennis Quaid, Woody Harrelson, Tadanobu Asano, Darren Criss	
N O V E M B E R	8	Klaus	Netflix	Sergio Pablos (director); Zach Lewis, Jim Mahoney (screenplay); J. K. Simmons, Jason Schwartzman, Rashida Jones, Will Sasso, Neda Margrethe Labba, Sergio Pablos, Norm Macdonald, Joan Cusack	
N O V E M B E R	8	Honey Boy	Amazon Studios	Alma Har'el (director); Shia LaBeouf (screenplay); Shia LaBeouf, Lucas Hedges, Noah Jupe, FKA Twigs	
N O V E M B E R	12	Lady and the Tramp	Walt Disney Pictures / Disney+	Charlie Bean (director); Andrew Bujalski, Kari Granlund (screenplay); Tessa Thompson, Justin Theroux, Kiersey Clemons, Thomas Mann, Janelle Monáe, F. Murray Abraham, Yvette Nicole Brown, Adrian Martinez, Ken Jeong, Sam Elliott	
N O V E M B E R	12	Noelle	Walt Disney Pictures / Disney+	Marc Lawrence (director/screenplay); Anna Kendrick, Bill Hader, Kingsley Ben-Adir, Billy Eichner, Julie Hagerty, Shirley MacLaine	
N O V E M B E R	15	Ford v Ferrari	20th Century Fox / Chernin Entertainment	James Mangold (director); Jez Butterworth, John-Henry Butterworth, Jason Keller (screenplay); Matt Damon, Christian Bale, Jon Bernthal, Caitriona Balfe, Tracy Letts, Josh Lucas, Noah Jupe, Remo Girone, Ray McKinnon	
N O V E M B E R	15	Charlie's Angels	Columbia Pictures / Perfect World Pictures	Elizabeth Banks (director/screenplay); Kristen Stewart, Naomi Scott, Ella Balinska, Elizabeth Banks, Djimon Hounsou, Sam Claflin, Noah Centineo, Nat Faxon, Patrick Stewart	
N O V E M B E R	15	The Good Liar	Warner Bros. Pictures / New Line Cinema / Bron Studios	Bill Condon (director); Jeffrey Hatcher (screenplay); Ian McKellen, Helen Mirren, Russell Tovey, Jim Carter	
N O V E M B E R	15	The Report	Amazon Studios	Scott Z. Burns (director/screenplay); Adam Driver, Annette Bening, Ted Levine, Michael C. Hall, Tim Blake Nelson, Corey Stoll, Maura Tierney, Jon Hamm	
N O V E M B E R	15	Waves	A24	Trey Edward Shults (director/screenplay); Kelvin Harrison Jr., Lucas Hedges, Taylor Russell, Alexa Demie, Renée Elise Goldsberry, Sterling K. Brown	
N O V E M B E R	22	Frozen 2	Walt Disney Pictures / Walt Disney Animation Studios	Chris Buck, Jennifer Lee (directors); Jennifer Lee (screenplay); Idina Menzel, Kristen Bell, Jonathan Groff, Josh Gad, Sterling K. Brown, Evan Rachel Wood, Alfred Molina, Martha Plimpton, Jason Ritter, Rachel Matthews, Jeremy Sisto, Ciarán Hinds	
N O V E M B E R	22	A Beautiful Day in the Neighborhood	TriStar Pictures / Tencent Pictures / Big Beach	Marielle Heller (director); Micah Fitzerman-Blue, Noah Harpster (screenplay); Tom Hanks, Matthew Rhys, Susan Kelechi Watson, Chris Cooper	
N O V E M B E R	22	21 Bridges	STX Entertainment	Brian Kirk (director); Matthew Michael Carnahan, Adam Mervis (screenplay); Chadwick Boseman, Sienna Miller, Stephan James, Keith David, Taylor Kitsch, J.K. Simmons	
N O V E M B E R	22	Dark Waters	Focus Features / Participant	Todd Haynes (director); Mario Correa, Matthew Michael Carnahan (screenplay); Mark Ruffalo, Anne Hathaway, Tim Robbins, Bill Camp, Victor Garber, Mare Winningham, William Jackson Harper, Bill Pullman	
N O V E M B E R	27	Knives Out	Lionsgate / Media Rights Capital	Rian Johnson (director/screenplay); Daniel Craig, Chris Evans, Ana de Armas, Jamie Lee Curtis, Michael Shannon, Don Johnson, Toni Collette, Lakeith Stanfield, Katherine Langford, Jaeden Martell, Christopher Plummer	
N O V E M B E R	27	Queen & Slim	Universal Pictures / Entertainment One / Bron Creative	Melina Matsoukas (director); Lena Waithe (screenplay); Daniel Kaluuya, Jodie Turner-Smith, Bokeem Woodbine, Chloë Sevigny, Flea, Sturgill Simpson, Indya Moore	
N O V E M B E R	27	The Two Popes	Netflix	Fernando Meirelles (director); Anthony McCarten (screenplay); Anthony Hopkins, Jonathan Pryce	
D E C E M B E R	6	Playmobil: The Movie	STX Entertainment	Lino DiSalvo (director), Ramaa Mosley (co-director); Blaise Hemingway (screenplay); Anya Taylor-Joy, Daniel Radcliffe, Gabriel Bateman, Jim Gaffigan, Meghan Trainor, Adam Lambert	
D E C E M B E R	6	The Aeronauts	Amazon Studios	Tom Harper (director); Jack Thorne (screenplay); Felicity Jones, Eddie Redmayne, Himesh Patel, Tom Courtenay	
D E C E M B E R	6	A Million Little Pieces	Momentum Pictures / The Picture Company	Sam Taylor-Johnson (director/screenplay); Aaron Taylor-Johnson (screenplay); Aaron Taylor-Johnson, Billy Bob Thornton, Odessa Young, Giovanni Ribisi, Juliette Lewis, Charlie Hunnam	
D E C E M B E R	6	Daniel Isn't Real	Samuel Goldwyn Films	Adam Egypt Mortimer (director/screenplay); Brian DeLeeuw (screenplay); Miles Robbins, Patrick Schwarzenegger, Sasha Lane, Mary Stuart Masterson, Hannah Marks, Chukwudi Iwuji, Peter McRobbie	
D E C E M B E R	6	Trauma Center	Lionsgate	Matt Eskandari (director); Paul Da Silva (screenplay); Bruce Willis, Nicky Whelan	
D E C E M B E R	13	Jumanji: The Next Level	Columbia Pictures / Seven Bucks Productions	Jake Kasdan (director/screenplay); Scott Rosenberg, Jeff Pinkner (screenplay); Dwayne Johnson, Jack Black, Kevin Hart, Karen Gillan, Nick Jonas, Awkwafina, Rory McCann, Alex Wolff, Morgan Turner, Ser'Darius Blain, Madison Iseman, Danny Glover, Danny DeVito	
D E C E M B E R	13	Richard Jewell	Warner Bros. Pictures / Malpaso Productions	Clint Eastwood (director); Billy Ray (screenplay); Paul Walter Hauser, Sam Rockwell, Kathy Bates, Jon Hamm, Olivia Wilde	
D E C E M B E R	13	Black Christmas	Universal Pictures / Blumhouse Productions	Sophia Takal (director/screenplay); April Wolfe (screenplay); Imogen Poots, Lily Donoghue, Aleyse Shannon, Brittany O'Grady, Caleb Eberhardt, Cary Elwes	
D E C E M B E R	13	6 Underground	Netflix / Skydance Media	Michael Bay (director); Rhett Reese, Paul Wernick (screenplay); Ryan Reynolds, Mélanie Laurent, Manuel Garcia-Rulfo, Adria Arjona, Payman Maadi, Corey Hawkins, Ben Hardy, Dave Franco	
D E C E M B E R	13	Bombshell	Lionsgate / Bron Creative / Annapurna Pictures	Jay Roach (director); Charles Randolph (screenplay); Charlize Theron, Nicole Kidman, Margot Robbie, John Lithgow, Kate McKinnon, Connie Britton, Mark Duplass, Rob Delaney, Malcolm McDowell, Allison Janney	
D E C E M B E R	13	Uncut Gems	A24	Safdie brothers (directors/screenplay); Ronald Bronstein (screenplay); Adam Sandler, Lakeith Stanfield, Julia Fox, Kevin Garnett, Idina Menzel, Eric Bogosian	
D E C E M B E R	13	Seberg	Amazon Studios	Benedict Andrews (director); Joe Shrapnel, Anna Waterhouse (screenplay); Kristen Stewart, Jack O'Connell, Margaret Qualley, Zazie Beetz, Vince Vaughn, Anthony Mackie	
D E C E M B E R	13	A Hidden Life	Fox Searchlight Pictures	Terrence Malick (director/screenplay); August Diehl, Valerie Pachner, Matthias Schoenaerts	
D E C E M B E R	20	Star Wars: The Rise of Skywalker	Lucasfilm / Bad Robot	J. J. Abrams (director/screenplay), Chris Terrio (screenplay); Carrie Fisher, Mark Hamill, Adam Driver, Daisy Ridley, John Boyega, Oscar Isaac, Anthony Daniels, Naomi Ackie, Domhnall Gleeson, Richard E. Grant, Lupita Nyong'o, Keri Russell, Joonas Suotamo, Kelly Marie Tran, Ian McDiarmid, Billy Dee Williams	
D E C E M B E R	20	Cats	Universal Pictures / Amblin Entertainment / Working Title Films	Tom Hooper (director/screenplay); Lee Hall (screenplay); James Corden, Judi Dench, Jason Derulo, Idris Elba, Jennifer Hudson, Ian McKellen, Taylor Swift, Rebel Wilson, Ray Winstone, Francesca Hayward	
D E C E M B E R	20	The Dare	B2Y Productions, JupiterLights Pictures, Nu Boyana Film Studios	Giles Alderson (director); Bart Edwards, Richard Brake, Richard Short, Alexandra Evans, Robert Maaser	
D E C E M B E R	20	Togo	Walt Disney Pictures / Disney+	Ericson Core (director); Tom Flynn (screenplay); Willem Dafoe, Julianne Nicholson, Christopher Heyerdahl, Michael Gaston, Michael McElhatton, Jamie McShane, Michael Greyeyes, Thorbjørn Harr, Shaun Benson, Nikolai Nikolaeff	
D E C E M B E R	25	Spies in Disguise	20th Century Fox Animation / Blue Sky Studios / Chernin Entertainment	Nick Bruno, Troy Quane (directors); Brad Copeland (screenplay); Will Smith, Tom Holland, Rashida Jones, Ben Mendelsohn, Reba McEntire, Rachel Brosnahan, Karen Gillan, DJ Khaled, Masi Oka	
D E C E M B E R	25	Little Women	Columbia Pictures / Regency Enterprises	Greta Gerwig (director/screenplay); Saoirse Ronan, Emma Watson, Florence Pugh, Eliza Scanlen, Laura Dern, Timothée Chalamet, Meryl Streep, Tracy Letts, Bob Odenkirk, James Norton, Louis Garrel, Chris Cooper	
D E C E M B E R	25	1917	Universal Pictures / DreamWorks Pictures	Sam Mendes (director/screenplay); Krysty Wilson-Cairns (screenplay); George MacKay, Dean-Charles Chapman, Mark Strong, Andrew Scott, Richard Madden, Claire Duburcq, Colin Firth, Benedict Cumberbatch	
D E C E M B E R	25	Just Mercy	Warner Bros. Pictures / Participant	Destin Daniel Cretton (director/screenplay), Andrew Lanham (screenplay); Michael B. Jordan, Jamie Foxx, Brie Larson, Rob Morgan, Tim Blake Nelson, Rafe Spall, O'Shea Jackson Jr., C.J. LeBlanc	
D E C E M B E R	27	Clemency	Neon	Chinonye Chukwu (director/screenplay); Alfre Woodard, Wendell Pierce, Aldis Hodge, Richard Schiff, Danielle Brooks	

== See also ==
- List of 2019 box office number-one films in the United States
- 2019 in the United States
