= Rachael Lippincott =

American novelist

- Born: December 5, 1994 (age 31); Philadelphia, Pennsylvania, U.S.
- Citizenship: American
- Education: University of Pittsburgh
- Occupation: Novelist
- Spouse: Alyson Derrick (m. 2020)
- Children: 2
- Writing career
- Language: English

Rachael Lippincott (born December 5, 1994) is an American novelist. She is a New York Times bestselling author. She is best known for writing the book adaptation of Five Feet Apart, published on November 20, 2018, which became a major motion picture directed by Justin Baldoni.

== Early life ==
Lippincott was born in Philadelphia, and raised in Bucks County, Pennsylvania. She graduated from George School in 2013. Lippincott originally attended the University of Pittsburgh for pre-med, before changing her major to English writing. She took a class called Writing Youth Literature taught by novelist Siobhan Vivian, which changed everything for her. She graduated in 2017.

== Career ==
In 2018, Lippincott wrote the novelization of Five Feet Apart from a screenplay by Mikki Daughtry and Tobias Iaconis. The book sold over a million copies and spent 60 weeks on the New York Times Bestseller List. It won Best Young Adult Fiction in the 11th Annual Goodreads Choice Awards.

In 2020, Lippincott published All This Time with Mikki Daughtry. It was a New York Times Bestseller.

Lippincott's next novel, The Lucky List, was published on June 1, 2021. It was her first solo novel.

Lippincott then co-wrote She Gets the Girl with her wife, Alyson Derrick. The story was loosely inspired by their own love story. It was a New York Times Bestseller.

In 2023, Lippincott released Pride and Prejudice and Pittsburgh, a sapphic time travel rom-com, after becoming obsessed with Pride and Prejudice, her wife's comfort movie during pregnancy.

In 2024, Lippincott published Make My Wish Come True, a Christmas rom-com co-written with her wife, Alyson Derrick.

== Personal life ==
Lippincott resides in Pennsylvania with her wife, daughters, and their dog, Hank.

== Bibliography ==
- 2018 – Five Feet Apart
- 2020 – All This Time
- 2021 – The Lucky List
- 2022 – She Gets the Girl, co-written with Alyson Derrick
- 2023 – Pride and Prejudice and Pittsburgh
- 2024 – Make My Wish Come True, co-written with Alyson Derrick
- 2025 - Joy to the Girls, co-written with Alyson Derrick
