= Esther the Wonder Pig =

Famous pig (2012–2023)

- Species: Pig
- Sex: Female
- Born: July 1, 2012
- Died: October 18, 2023 (aged 11); Campbellville, Ontario, Canada
- Known for: Celebrity on social media
- Owners: Steve Jenkins; Derek Walter
- Residence: Campbellville, Ontario, Canada

Esther the Wonder Pig (2012 – 2023) was a pet pig who gained an online following. She is also known for inspiring conversations about veganism and factory farming.

== Life ==
Esther was born at a commercial pig farm on July 1, 2012. In 2012, Esther was sold mistakenly as a miniature pig to her new owners, Steve Jenkins and Derek Walter. In the following two years, Esther unexpectedly grew to a weight of 600 pounds (272 kg), which is far greater than the typical weight of a miniature pig. Due to her surprisingly large size, she earned the nickname "The Wonder Pig". In 2014, the owners founded an animal sanctuary, Happily Ever Esther Farm Sanctuary, named after Esther. In 2018, the owners raised money for a CT scanner big enough to scan Esther. Later in 2018, Esther was diagnosed with breast cancer and stomach ulcer. Following surgery, she was declared cancer-free. In August 2019, she had a bone infection that resulted in a toe amputation. In October 2019, she met Greta Thunberg. Esther spent most of 2018 and 2019 at the Ontario Veterinary College. Esther died in her sleep on October 18, 2023.

== Media ==
A book, Esther the Wonder Pig: Changing the World One Heart at a Time, was released in 2016. Library Journal said the book is "[a] fun read with an important message about animal cruelty." Publishers Weekly called the book "[f]unny, entertaining, enlightening, and touching [...]". A sequel book, Happily Ever Esther: Two Men, a Wonder Pig, and Their Life-Changing Mission to Give Animals a Home, was released in 2018. Publishers Weekly said the book has the same jovial tone as the first book and recommended it to the fans of the Wonder Pig franchise. A picture book, The True Adventures of Esther the Wonder Pig, was also released in 2018. Publishers Weekly wrote: "An Esther-goes-missing subplot in the final pages feels unnecessary—there’s plenty of narrative fodder in a pig who takes over a family." All three books appeared on The New York Times Best Seller list. All books were authored by Steve Jenkins, Derek Walter, and Caprice Crane.

In 2019, a film adaptation was announced. CBS Films hired Mikki Daughtry and Tobias Iaconis to write the screenplay and The Donners' Company was producing the film.

== See also ==
- List of individual pigs
