= Nightbooks =

2021 film by David Yarovesky

- Release poster
- Directed by: David Yarovesky
- Screenplay by: Mikki Daughtry; Tobias Iaconis
- Based on: Nightbooks by J. A. White
- Produced by: Sam Raimi; Romel Adam; Mason Novick; Michelle Knudsen
- Starring: Winslow Fegley; Lidya Jewett; Krysten Ritter
- Cinematography: Robert McLachlan
- Edited by: Peter Gvozdas
- Music by: Michael Abels
- Production companies: Ghost House Pictures; MXN Entertainment; Catchlight Studios
- Distributed by: Netflix
- Release date: September 15, 2021
- Running time: 103 minutes
- Country: United States
- Language: English

Nightbooks is a 2021 American dark fantasy film directed by David Yarovesky from a screenplay by Mikki Daughtry and Tobias Iaconis, based on the 2018 children's book by J. A. White. The film stars Winslow Fegley, Lidya Jewett, and Krysten Ritter. Nightbooks was released on Netflix on September 15, 2021.

== Plot ==
Alex Mosher, a young boy from Brooklyn, New York City, overhears his parents talking about how worried they are about his preoccupation with writing scary stories and their fear of how he will react to a recent incident. Screaming in pain, Alex trashes his room, grabs his "Nightbooks" and takes the elevator to the basement, planning to burn them in the furnace.

The elevator suddenly stops—and stays—on a dark floor where an apartment's open door reveals a TV showing Alex's favorite film, The Lost Boys. He enters and sees a piece of pumpkin pie that was not touched. He eats the pie and passes out, making the door and television vanish.

He awakens to find himself in the magical apartment of a beautiful witch named Natacha who shows him a closet full of clothes belonging to children who were "not useful to her". Alex denies having any unique qualities but when he shows her his books, she demands that he read a new story to her each night, or die. She puts him to work alongside the housekeeper, a girl named Yasmin, who was lured into the apartment in Washington, D.C. The apartment moves around the world, seeking victims. The doors respond only to Natacha's keys. Her ill-tempered, sometimes-invisible cat, Lenore, spies on them.

Natacha demands that Alex's stories end unhappily. If not, the apartment shakes. She repeatedly asks why he wanted to burn his writings, but he manages to distract her. Searching her vast library for inspiration, Alex finds notes in the margins of books detailing the escape plans of a trapped girl. She writes about her treasured unicorn necklace, so he dubs her "Unicorn Girl".

Yasmin and Alex bond, and they eventually win Lenore's trust. Yasmin tearfully reveals she was afraid to befriend him because Natacha killed the others by transforming them into little figurines, now displayed in Natacha's cabinet. None has a unicorn necklace; Alex concludes that Unicorn Girl escaped. Her notes contain a recipe for a sleeping potion. Lenore slips it into Natacha's perfume bottle. When she falls asleep, they steal her keys and open the door, revealing a forest. They soon realize they are still inside the apartment.

An evil unicorn drives them to a gingerbread cottage that mesmerizes Yasmin. They eat the gingerbread and fall unconscious. Alex wakes to find Yasmin and Lenore caged in a room lined with countless skulls. Blue mist is being siphoned from a coffin containing a witchlike figure. Natacha reveals that she was the Unicorn Girl, who after successfully escaping the original witch—who ate all her victims except Natacha—, was able to put her to sleep and returned to her home, only to find that her parents had moved away. With nowhere to go, she returned, studied witchcraft, and eventually lulled the witch into a deep sleep, using scary stories due to her immense love for them. Alex has been helping her keep the witch unconscious with his own scary stories while Natacha harvests her magic. The room shakes. They will all die if the witch wakes. Alex's fear of telling his truth makes it the ultimate scary story. He begins:

Alex is used to being called names, but on his birthday, his supposed best friend, Josh, admits that Alex is too "weird". Everyone is going to Cody's party instead. Alex's parents are distressed when no one comes to Alex's. "They made him hate himself," and Alex, ashamed and hurt, resolves to hide what made him special. Natacha and the sleeping witch are mollified, but suddenly Alex says that he is glad he was kidnapped because he met Yasmin and Lenore, friends who value him.

The happy ending wakes the hideous witch. While the witches battle, Yasmin grabs Natacha's perfume bottle and flees with Alex and Lenore. The front door opens into Alex's building. The ravenous witch pursues them to the basement. Alex distracts her by pretending to read a story, then pauses on a cliffhanger and throws the empty notebook into the furnace. The witch reaches for it. They push her in and hold the door shut while she melts.

Alex introduces Yasmin and Lenore to his delighted parents as his best friends. Yasmin is reunited with her family. On a later visit, she gives Alex a beautiful leather-bound notebook signed "Stay weird storyteller. Yas."

Meanwhile, a figurine in Natacha's cabinet begin to crackle. Natacha's hand slams down, and we hear her laughter.

== Cast ==
- Winslow Fegley as Alex, a young boy with a penchant for scary stories who plots to escape the clutches of an evil witch.
- Lidya Jewett as Yasmin, a girl who was trapped and lured in by a witch years ago and is forced to be her housemaid until Alex enters her life.
- Krysten Ritter as Natacha, a witch who kidnaps children and is the captor of Alex and Yasmin.

== Production ==
In June 2019, it was announced that Netflix was developing an adaptation of Nightbooks, with Mikki Daughtry and Tobias Iaconis writing the script. In October 2020, it was announced that Krysten Ritter, Winslow Fegley and Lidya Jewett would star in the film and that David Yarovesky would direct. The film was produced by Sam Raimi and Romel Adam through Ghost House Pictures, and by Mason Novick and Michelle Knudsen through MXN Entertainment.

Principal photography took place from October 14 to December 17, 2020, in Toronto.

== Release ==
The film was released on Netflix on September 15, 2021.

== Reception ==
On the review aggregator website Rotten Tomatoes, the film holds an approval rating of 87% based on 25 reviews, with an average rating of 6.9/10. The website's critics consensus reads, "Its contents may be a bit busy and overly familiar, but Nightbooks offers a fun—and actually fairly scary—gateway to horror for younger viewers." Metacritic gave the film a weighted average score of 65 out of 100 based on 5 critics, indicating "generally favorable reviews".

Meagan Navarro, writing for horror magazine Bloody Disgusting, gave the film three out of five stars, and specified that, "Nightbooks takes a while to warm up, but the back half brings the gateway horror fun," adding, "It's silly, whimsical, and creative, with a charming pair of leads. It's for the young and the young at heart, wrapping a very familiar tale in creative horror-fantasy packaging. Using The Lost Boys' song "Cry Little Sister" as a rallying anthem certainly helps."
