= Caprice Crane =

American novelist and screenwriter

- Born: Caprice Alexandra Crane; November 1, 1970 (age 55); Hollywood, California, U.S.
- Education: Tisch School of the Arts
- Occupations: Novelist; screenwriter; television writer/producer; music supervisor
- Children: 2
- Parent(s): Les Crane; Tina Louise
- Website: capricecrane.com

Caprice Alexandra Crane (born November 1, 1970, in Hollywood, California) is an American novelist, screenwriter and television writer/producer.

== Biography ==
Crane was born in Los Angeles, California, the daughter of radio announcer/television talk show host Les Crane and actress Tina Louise. After she graduated from New York University (NYU) Tisch School of the Arts Film School, MTV hired her to write, produce and music supervise game shows, sports shows, music specials and the MTV Video Music Awards.

Her first novel's title, Stupid & Contagious (2006), is taken from the lyrics of the Nirvana song, "Smells Like Teen Spirit." Her second novel, Forget About It (2007), was once rumored to be made into a New Line Cinema motion picture starring Scarlett Johansson. Both her first and second books won Romantic Times Reader's Choice Awards, two years in a row, in the Mainstream Fiction Chick Lit category.

Her third novel, Family Affair, was released in October 2009. Her fourth novel, With a Little Luck, was published on July 26, 2011, by Bantam Books. Crane wrote the original screenplay for the 2011 film Love, Wedding, Marriage starring Mandy Moore and Kellan Lutz. Crane's debut young adult novel Confessions of a Hater was released in August 2013 with critical praise from The New York Times. In 2016, Crane co-authored the book Esther the Wonder Pig: Changing the World One Heart at a Time, published May 31, 2016. Esther The Wonder Pig was a New York Times Best Seller.

Crane has also worked in staff positions as a writer for TV shows such as CW's 90210 and Melrose Place. She had a TV pilot based on her novel Stupid & Contagious in development for NBC. Crane divides her time between New York and Los Angeles.
