= Come Play =

2020 film by Jacob Chase

- Theatrical release poster
- Directed by: Jacob Chase
- Screenplay by: Jacob Chase
- Based on: Larry by Jacob Chase
- Produced by: Andrew Rona; Alex Heineman
- Starring: Gillian Jacobs; John Gallagher Jr.; Azhy Robertson; Winslow Fegley
- Cinematography: Maxime Alexandre
- Edited by: Gregory Plotkin
- Music by: Roque Baños
- Production companies: Amblin Partners; The Picture Company; Reliance Entertainment
- Distributed by: Focus Features (United States); United International Pictures (International)
- Release date: October 30, 2020 (United States)
- Running time: 96 minutes
- Country: United States
- Language: English
- Budget: $9 million
- Box office: $13.2 million

Come Play is a 2020 American supernatural horror thriller film written and directed by Jacob Chase, based on his own short film titled Larry. The film stars Gillian Jacobs, John Gallagher Jr., Azhy Robertson, and Winslow Fegley. A gruesome monster named "Larry" manifests itself through smartphones and mobile devices while trying to take Oliver, a lonely boy desperate for a friend.

Come Play was released in the United States on October 30, 2020, by Focus Features. The film received mixed reviews from critics and grossed $13 million against a budget of $9 million.

== Plot ==
Oliver is a young, non-verbal boy with autism who relies entirely on a smartphone and tablet to communicate with his parents, Sarah and Marty. He is taken care of by his mother, while his father Marty spends most of his time at work to support the family. Sarah and Marty's marriage has become strained that Marty eventually moves out.

One night, Oliver notices a mysterious digital book on his tablet titled Misunderstood Monsters, which narrates the story of a grotesque, skeletal creature named Larry who 'just wants a friend.' Upon reading it, Oliver experiences terrifying paranormal activity. After his bedroom lights flicker, he opens a facial-recognition app on his tablet, only for it to detect an invisible face standing right next to him. Later at school, Oliver faces intense loneliness. A former friend named Byron, and a group of bullies, corners Oliver in a field, steals his phone, and throws it away.

Sarah organizes a sleepover to help Oliver socialize, inviting three of the classmates who bullied him. During the night, one of the boys retrieves Oliver's tablet and reads Larry's story. Suddenly, the house lights go out, and through the tablet's camera, the boys spot Larry lingering in the darkness. Skeptical of the presence, Byron investigates and is invisibly attacked, leaving all three terrified boys to blame Oliver for the incident. In the following days, paranormal events plague the house. Sarah witnesses the anomalies, and interacts with Larry through the tablet, realizing the monster intends to "take" Oliver back to its dimension forever.

Marty takes Oliver to his night-shift job as a parking lot attendant where Larry, revealed as a pale, skeletal, ghoul-like creature, begins to stalk them. When Marty witnesses Larry lifting Oliver off the ground (actually seeing Larry), Marty finally believes Sarah's claims about the entity. Realizing that Larry is a creature from another dimension seeking a human companion for his realm, the parents smash the tablet to prevent the monster from emerging and abducting Oliver.

Traumatized by the incident, Byron absolves Oliver of blame and insists that Larry is responsible. The two were once good friends until Oliver accidentally hit Byron during a sensory overload, causing a rift between their mothers that kept the boys apart. Communicating via a translation app, they uncover the truth behind their falling out: Oliver's mother had lied, claiming Oliver no longer wanted to be friends. With the misunderstanding resolved, they reconcile at school. Later that night, Larry's story unexpectedly pops up on Marty's phone at work. When he scrolls through it, the creature appears and attacks him for protecting Oliver. Marty manages to drive away but is hospitalized with injuries after being run off the road by the startled encounter.

Sarah and Oliver attempt to destroy every electronic device in the house. They realize Larry is a creature born from human technology and tech-isolation; he doesn't need a specific device anymore because he uses electricity itself to cross over. Forcing his digital story to its conclusion, Larry triggers a total power outage and emerges from a television screen, using it as a doorway into their world. As Larry hunts for the boy, Sarah and Oliver hide before fleeing the house. Hoping to escape the monster, Sarah rushes Oliver to a nearby field completely devoid of electricity. Larry tracks them down anyway, utilizing Oliver's discarded phone still lying hidden in the grass to breach the field and resume its pursuit.

As they flee, Larry captures Oliver and begins dragging him into the woods. Desperate to protect his mother, Oliver prepares to take the monster's hand and accept his fate. Intervening at the final second, Sarah offers herself to Larry instead, sacrificing her own freedom to ensure her son's safety. In their final moments together on Earth, Oliver looks Sarah directly in the eye for the first time, a profound connection she had desperately sought ever since his diagnosis. Larry accepts the trade, taking Sarah's hand and pulling her into his dark dimension. The film concludes with Oliver grieving the loss of his mother, though he soon discovers that her protective spirit lives on through his screens.

A short time later, Oliver lives with Marty, who has become deeply involved in his son's therapy as they learn to navigate Oliver's autism together. One night, the lights go out once more, and strange noises echo from downstairs. Marty grabs his tablet and looks through the screen, only to see Oliver playing happily with Sarah's ghost. Sarah smiles and tells her son, 'I will protect you,' leaving Marty to watch them with a peaceful smile.

== Cast ==
- Azhy Robertson as Oliver, an autistic boy
- Gillian Jacobs as Sarah, Oliver's mother
- John Gallagher Jr. as Marty, Oliver's father
- Winslow Fegley as Byron, Oliver's former friend, who later becomes his friend again
- Rachel Wilson as Jennifer, Byron's mother
- Jayden Marine as Mateo, one of Oliver's new friends
- Gavin MacIver-Wright as Zach, one of Oliver's new friends
- Eboni Booth as Dr. Robyn, a speech therapist
- Dalmar Abuzeid as Mr. Calarco, a teacher

== Production ==
It was announced in February 2018 that Jacob Chase would write and direct a film adaptation of his short film Larry. In September 2018, Gillian Jacobs and Azhy Robertson were cast in the film, and in November 2018, John Gallagher Jr. was added as well.

== Release ==
Come Play was theatrically released in the United States on October 30, 2020. It was previously scheduled to be released on July 24, 2020, but the release was rescheduled due to the COVID-19 pandemic. The studio spent "in the high single digit million range" promoting the film.

=== Home media ===
Come Play was released on DVD and Blu-ray on January 26, 2021, by Universal Pictures Home Entertainment.

== Reception ==
=== Box office ===
Come Play grossed $10.5 million in the United States and Canada, and $2.7 million in other territories, for a worldwide total of $13.2 million.

The film grossed $1 million from 2,183 theaters on its first day, including $150,000 from Thursday night previews. It went on to debut to $3.2 million, over the October 30–November 1 Halloween weekend, coming in slightly above projections and topping the box office. The film fell 45% to $1.7 million in its second weekend, finishing second, after fellow Focus Features release Let Him Go, and then made $1.1 million in its third weekend.

=== Critical response ===
On the review aggregator website Rotten Tomatoes, 56% of 120 critics' reviews are positive, with an average rating of 5.9/10. The website's consensus reads: "A frightening feature debut from Jacob Chase, Come Play makes up for its uneven tone by adding real depth to its jarring scares." Metacritic, which uses a weighted average, assigned the film a score of 58 out of 100, based on 21 critics, indicating "mixed or average" reviews. Audiences polled by CinemaScore gave the film an average grade of "B−" on an A+ to F scale, while PostTrak reported 60% of audience members gave the film a positive score, with 40% saying they would definitely recommend it.

David Ehrlich, writing for IndieWire, gave the film a "C−" grade, writing, "merely serviceable, [the film] leaves you with the feeling that a much better game was lost in the shuffle." The A.V. Club's A. A. Dowd gave it a "B" and called it "an Amblin entertainment in the purest, classic sense." In Variety's review, Courtney Howard stated, "The title stands as a beckoning call to audiences to join in the devilish delights he's conjured. Yet the scares in the tale fail to scale from a mobile device to the big screen."
