= Five Feet Apart =

2019 film by Justin Baldoni

- Theatrical release poster
- Directed by: Justin Baldoni
- Written by: Mikki Daughtry; Tobias Iaconis
- Produced by: Cathy Schulman; Justin Baldoni
- Starring: Haley Lu Richardson; Cole Sprouse; Moisés Arias; Kimberly Hébert Gregory; Parminder Nagra; Claire Forlani
- Cinematography: Frank G. DeMarco
- Edited by: Angela M. Catanzaro
- Music by: Brian Tyler; Breton Vivian
- Production companies: CBS Films; Welle Entertainment; Wayfarer Entertainment
- Distributed by: Lionsgate
- Release date: March 15, 2019
- Running time: 116 minutes
- Country: United States
- Language: English
- Budget: $7 million
- Box office: $92.6 million

Five Feet Apart is a 2019 American coming-of-age romantic drama film directed by Justin Baldoni (in his directorial debut) and written by Mikki Daughtry and Tobias Iaconis. The film was inspired by Claire Wineland, who had cystic fibrosis. Haley Lu Richardson and Cole Sprouse play two young patients with cystic fibrosis who try to have a relationship despite being forced to stay five feet apart from each other.

The film was released in the United States on March 15, 2019, by CBS Films via Lionsgate. It received mixed reviews from critics and grossed $92.5 million worldwide.

== Plot ==
Teenagers Stella Grant and Will Newman have cystic fibrosis (CF), a progressive genetic disorder that damages organs and makes patients vulnerable to infections. Due to their compromised immune systems, patients with CF should stay six feet (1.8 m) apart.

Stella, who copes with her illness by trying to maintain control of her daily regimen, takes her medication religiously and follows doctors' orders precisely. Will, a cynical rebel whose prognosis is grim, is much more lackadaisical, an attitude that frustrates the meticulous Stella.

Will has contracted B. cepacia, and is part of a new drug trial, but the infection makes him ineligible for a lung transplant. Stella has been on the transplant list for a long time.

When Stella discovers that Will is doing his treatments every Thursday morning at 9 am sharp with autumn moon, she tries to help him. In return, he only asks her for permission to draw a picture of her. Will begins to watch Stella's social media videos. Over time, they start doing their treatments together.

Will and Stella fall in love, but they must remain socially distanced. Her G-tube becomes infected, so she has to undergo surgery to get it replaced. Will discovers that Stella's sister Abby, who unfailingly cared for Stella, died from a daredevil stunt one year ago. Because Abby is dead, Stella must face the operation alone, while wracked with survivor guilt. After learning of Abby's death, Will shows up to support Stella, and he sings her the song Abby always sang to her before surgery.

As Will leaves Stella's surgical prep room, he is caught by nurse Barb. She tells him about two young people with CF who died after they fell in love and broke the six-foot rule, contaminating each other. Will realizes he loves Stella too much to endanger her, so he tells her he can't see her anymore.

Stella becomes upset and angry but eventually plans to meet Will. She decides to take back one foot (30 cm) that CF has stolen from her, and carries a five-foot (1.5 m) pool cue so she can keep a safe distance from Will.

On Will's birthday, Stella's best friend Poe, another CF patient, dies. As an act of rebellion against CF, the two leave the hospital to visit the lights that Stella could see from her hospital room, as Stella has long dreamed of doing.

While away from the hospital, Stella receives a text that her lung transplant is en route, which she ignores. She falls through the ice of a frozen pond as she and Will leave to return to the hospital. She struggles but is near death when Will reaches into the water and pulls her out.

Even though saliva contact is very dangerous for people with CF, he gives her CPR to save her life. Stella survives, and Will and Stella are brought back to the hospital. Will fears the CPR he gave her may have infected her with B. cepacia, but Stella's lung transplant goes smoothly, and miraculously, she has not contracted B. cepacia.

Meanwhile, Will finds out that the drug trial he has been on has not been working for him. While Stella is still under anesthesia following the transplant, her parents, Will's mother, and the nurses and doctors help Will set up the lights outside of Stella's room.

After realizing he would likely infect her, Will decides to say a final goodbye to Stella and confesses his love for her. Before he leaves, he gives her his sketchbook of drawings he had done of her and her friends during their stay in the hospital.

== Cast ==
- Haley Lu Richardson as Stella Grant
  - Evangeline Hill as young Stella
- Cole Sprouse as William "Will" Newman
- Moisés Arias as Poe Ramirez
  - Kristopher Perez as young Poe
- Kimberly Hébert Gregory as Nurse Barbara
- Emily Baldoni as Nurse Julie
- Parminder Nagra as Dr. Hamid
- Claire Forlani as Meredith Newman, Will's mother
- Cynthia Evans as Erin Grant, Stella's mother
- Gary Weeks as Tom Grant, Stella's father
- Sophia Bernard as Abby Grant, Stella's younger sister
  - Ivy Dubreuil as young Abby
- Cecilia Leal as Camila

== Production ==
In January 2017, Tobias Iaconis and Mikki Daughtry sold their untitled screenplay to CBS Films for Justin Baldoni to produce and direct.

Baldoni first became involved with cystic fibrosis when he directed the documentary My Last Days. He met YouTuber Claire Wineland and subsequently hired her as a consultant for the film. Wineland died from complications of a lung transplant for CF in September 2018, a few months after filming was completed.

In January 2018, Cole Sprouse was cast to star in the film, now entitled Five Feet Apart. In April of that year, Haley Lu Richardson was also set to star, and Moisés Arias joined in a supporting role. Principal production began a month later on May 25 in New Orleans, Louisiana, and concluded on June 26.

The film's title refers to the "six foot rule", a guideline from the Cystic Fibrosis Foundation (CFF) which states that cystic fibrosis patients should be kept at least six feet (1.8 m) apart from each other, to lower the risk of cross-infection. In 2020, about a year after the film's release, a similar guideline for social distancing to help slow the spread of COVID-19 would become nearly universal.

A novelization of the screenplay by Rachael Lippincott was published in November 2018.

== Music ==
Brian Tyler and Breton Vivian composed the score. The soundtrack was released on Lakeshore Records on March 15, 2019, and includes a deluxe edition that "My Baby Just Cares for Me" performed by Kate Davis. Andy Grammer's song "Don't Give Up on Me" was written to promote the film and released in February 2019.

== Release ==
The novel was published in November 2018, which allowed printing to begin in February of the following year. The first print run consisted of 90,000. These copies were used to promote the upcoming release of the film.

The film was released on March 15, 2019, by CBS Films via Lionsgate. The studio spent $12 million on prints and advertising.

== Reception ==
=== Box office ===
Five Feet Apart grossed $45.7 million in the U.S. and Canada and $46.8 million in other territories, for a worldwide total of $92.5 million, against a production budget of $7 million.

In the U.S. and Canada, Five Feet Apart was released alongside Captive State and Wonder Park, and was projected to gross $6–$10 million from 2,600 theaters in its opening weekend. The film made $5.4 million on its first day, including $715,000 from Thursday night previews. Its three-day gross was $13.1 million, finishing third, behind Captain Marvel and Wonder Park. The film fell 35% in its second weekend, grossing $8.5 million, and dropped another 27% in its third weekend, earning $6.3 million.

=== Critical response ===
On the review aggregator website Rotten Tomatoes, the film holds an approval rating of 52% based on 130 reviews, with an average rating of 5.7/10. The website's critical consensus reads, "Elevated considerably by Haley Lu Richardson's performance but bogged down by clichés, Five Feet Apart doesn't tug at the heartstrings quite as deftly as it should." On Metacritic, the film has a weighted average score of 53 out of 100, based on 26 critics, indicating "mixed or average" reviews. Audiences polled by CinemaScore gave the film an average grade of "A" on an A+ to F scale, while filmgoers at PostTrak gave it 3 1/2 out of 5 stars.

Andrew Barker of Variety praised the performance of Richardson, which he called "a star turn," though he described the film as an "otherwise formulaic teen romance." Katie Walsh of the Los Angeles Times praised Richardson for the depth and range of her performance. Caroline Siede of The A.V. Club commended the lead performances but said "In the end... even Richardson and Sprouse can't fully overcome the clumsy mawkishness around them."

=== Response from cystic fibrosis community ===
Responses from the cystic fibrosis community were mixed. The CFF welcomed the opportunity to raise awareness about the struggle many patients experience with the disease, while others found fault with the film's depiction of medically dangerous behavior. Others voiced concern about a terminal illness being romanticized and trivialized as a Hollywood teen romance plot device.

One doctor from Johns Hopkins All Children's Hospital voiced their concern by stating the movie had false premises on the "six foot rule" to begin with. The doctor shared that the "six foot rule" was only accurate when outdoors. They continued to share that when indoors, the "six foot rule" would be ineffective due to the fact that hospitals have one AC system, spreading the bacteria in a closed system. According to Healthy Balance, by the University of Virginia, other myths about cystic fibrosis are exposed during the film. It is portrayed that CF is contagious by cough when in fact, it is not. Also, the film shows the two lovestruck teens with oxygen tanks when that is not the case for everyone with cystic fibrosis. CF can be diagnosed as unnoticeable.

The film was promoted using Instagram, where the studio paid influencers to post about hardships involving love and physical distance. Many of the posts discussed family members who lived far away; the promotion was perceived as tone-deaf and trivializing a fatal disease. After the ensuing backlash, the campaign was pulled, and the studio apologized.

== See also ==
- Everything, Everything
- Midnight Sun
- The Fault in Our Stars
- Keith
- A Walk to Remember
- Love Story
- Me and Earl and the Dying Girl
- The Space Between Us
- Contagion
- Me Before You
