= Winslow Fegley =

American actor (born 2009)

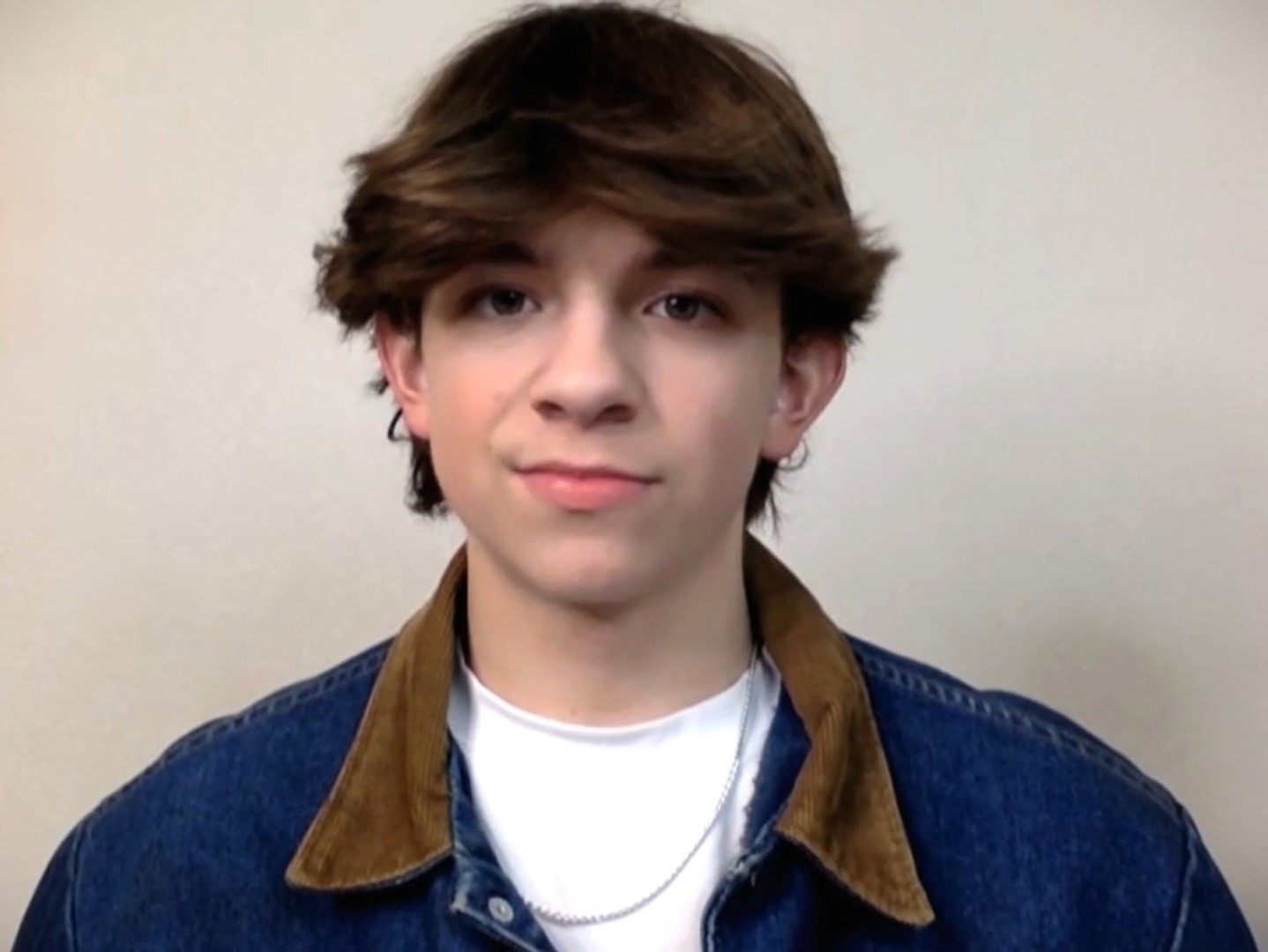
- Fegley in 2023
- Born: Winslow Burke Fegley; January 29, 2009 (age 17); Allentown, Pennsylvania, U.S.
- Education: Cheyenne Mountain High School
- Occupation: Actor
- Years active: 2018–present
- Notable work: Timmy Failure: Mistakes Were Made; Come Play; Nightbooks; Lyle, Lyle, Crocodile
- Relatives: Oakes Fegley (brother)

Winslow Burke Fegley (born January 29, 2009) is an American actor. He has starred in the films Timmy Failure: Mistakes Were Made (2020), Nightbooks, 8-Bit Christmas (both 2021), and Lyle, Lyle, Crocodile (2022).

== Early life ==
Fegley was born on January 29, 2009, in Allentown, Pennsylvania, the son of actors Michael Fegley and Mercedes "Merce" (née Tonne) Fegley. He is the younger brother of actor Oakes Fegley. He attends Cheyenne Mountain High School in Colorado Springs, Colorado.

== Career ==
In 2020, Fegley portrayed Byron in supernatural horror thriller film Come Play starring John Gallagher Jr., Rachel Wilson, and Gillian Jacobs.

Fegley starred in the HBO movie 8-Bit Christmas, playing the lead role of Young Jake while adult Jake was played by Neil Patrick Harris, and Disney's comedy film, Timmy Failure: Mistakes Were Made, playing Timmy, the title character.

In 2021, Fegley portrayed the role of Alex Mosher in Netflix original fantasy film Nightbooks alongside Krysten Ritter.

In 2022, he starred in the live action and animated film Lyle, Lyle, Crocodile.

In 2023, Fegley starred in biographical drama film Spinning Gold portraying the young version Neil Bogart while the adult version being portrayed by Jeremy Jordan.

== Filmography ==
=== Film ===
Year	Title	Role	Notes
2020	Timmy Failure: Mistakes Were Made	Timmy Failure	
2020	Come Play	Byron	
2021	Nightbooks	Alex Mosher	
2021	8-Bit Christmas	young Jake Doyle	
2022	Lyle, Lyle, Crocodile	Josh Primm	
2023	Spinning Gold	young Neil Bogart	
2025	When the Moon Was Twice as Big	Elmer's Son	Post-production

=== Television ===
Year	Title	Role	Notes
2018	Teachers	Daniel	Episode: "Gender Bender"
2019	Fast Layne	Mel	Main role
2019	The Good Doctor	Preteen Shaun Murphy	Episode: "Friends and Family"
2023	The Naughty Nine	Andy Steele	Disney Channel Original Movie
