= Tobias Iaconis =

German American screenwriter

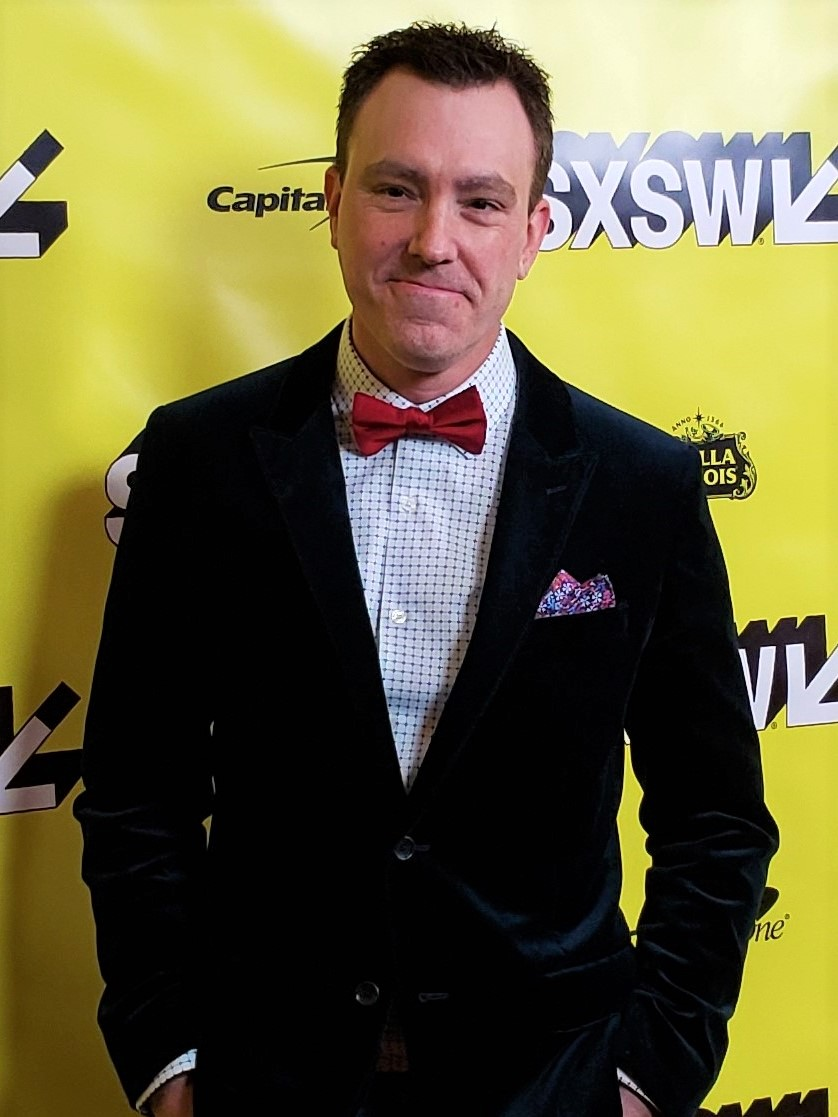
- Iaconis at the premiere of The Curse of La Llorona, 2019
- Born: Landstuhl, Rhineland-Palatinate, Germany
- Education: Haverford College
- Occupation: Screenwriter

Tobias Iaconis is a German American screenwriter. His writing partner is Mikki Daughtry. He is best known for writing, with Daughtry, the films The Curse of La Llorona (2019), Five Feet Apart (2019) and Nightbooks (2021).

== Early life ==
Iaconis was born in Germany, to a German mother and an American father. A dual citizen, he grew up outside of the city of Kaiserslautern, attending U.S. Department of Defense Dependents Schools. At the age of eighteen, he moved to the United States to attend Haverford College, where he studied English literature with a concentration in creative writing.

== Career ==
In 2009, Iaconis was the writer of Behind Enemy Lines: Colombia for 20th Century Fox Home Entertainment, starring Joe Manganiello and Ken Anderson. Previously he had written an unproduced sequel to Timecop for Universal Pictures Home Entertainment, and in 2010 he wrote an unproduced sequel to Shooter for Paramount Famous Productions.

After partnering with Mikki Daughtry in 2012, they adapted the Jack Kilborn action-horror novel Afraid, for Vincent Newman Entertainment.

In 2013, their script Elsewhere made the Black List (a survey of Hollywood's best unproduced screenplays, as voted on by more than 250 studio execs).

In 2014, Daughtry and Iaconis were hired to write an English-language remake of Sleep Tight (Spanish: Mientras duermes, "While You Sleep"), a Spanish thriller-horror film directed by Jaume Balagueró.

In 2015, Daughtry and Iaconis sold a pitch, The Children, to New Line Cinema. The film began principal photography in October 2017, with stars Linda Cardellini, Raymond Cruz, Patricia Velasquez, Jaynee Lynne Kinchen, and Roman Christou, and Michael Chaves directing. In July 2018, the movie's final title was announced as The Curse of La Llorona, and the film premiered at the SXSW Film Festival on March 15, 2019, where it was revealed to be a part of The Conjuring cinematic universe. The movie was released theatrically on April 19, 2019. Reviews were largely unfavorable, but the movie far exceeded opening-weekend box office expectations and was the top-grossing film, both domestically and internationally, that weekend. It has earned $123M worldwide on a production budget of $9M, and received a CinemaScore of "B−", which is considered high for a movie in the horror genre.

In January 2017, Daughtry and Iaconis sold a young adult-themed pitch, Five Feet Apart, to CBS Films, for Justin Baldoni to produce and direct. Cole Sprouse (in the first film role of his adult career) and Haley Lu Richardson starred, with Moisés Arias in a supporting role, and Academy Award-winner Cathy Schulman producing. The film commenced principal photography in May 2018, and was released on March 15, 2019. Reviews were mixed, but the movie received a CinemaScore of "A" and out-performed box office expectations, earning over $92M world-wide on a production budget of $7M. A novel based upon the screenplay, written by Rachael Lippincott with Daughtry and Iaconis, was published by Simon & Schuster on November 20, 2018, became a number-one New York Times Best Seller, and won the 2019 Goodreads' Choice Awards for Best Young Adult Fiction.

In November 2017, Daughtry and Iaconis were included in The Young and Hungry List 2017 (a list of Hollywood's top 100 new writers).

In March 2019, Daughtry and Iaconis were hired by CBS Films to write the screenplay based on the social media sensation Esther the Wonder Pig. Jack Leslie, and Lauren Shuler Donner of the Donners’ Company, are producing. The film will follow the true story of how a couple adopts what they believe to be a five-pound pigmy pig, which then grows to 650 pounds, inspiring the local community and millions of online followers in the process.

In June 2019, Daughtry and Iaconis signed on to pen the screenplay for Netflix's film adaptation of the children's fantasy-horror book, Nightbooks, by author J. A. White. The movie was produced by Sam Raimi and Romel Adam of Ghost House Pictures, and Mason Novick and Michelle Knudsen of MXN Entertainment. The story follows Alex, a boy obsessed with scary stories, who is trapped by a witch in her modern, magical New York City apartment; Alex's original hair-raising tales are the only thing keeping him safe. David Yarovesky directed the film, with a cast that includes Krysten Ritter, Winslow Fegley, and Lidya Jewett. Nightbooks premiered on Netflix, in nearly 190 countries, on September 15, 2021, and at its peak was the second-most-viewed Netflix film in the world, and received positive reviews from critics.

In July 2019, All This Time, a follow-up to the New York Times Best Selling book, Five Feet Apart, was announced, written by Mikki Daughtry with Rachael Lippincott. In February 2020, the book's cover was revealed, and an excerpt published. That same month, Lionsgate Films optioned the film rights to the book, and hired Daughtry and Iaconis to adapt the book for film; Daughtry and Iaconis will additionally serve as Executive Producers. The novel was released on September 29, 2020, and became a New York Times Best Seller. In All This Time, a former high school quarterback, Kyle, is left grief-stricken by the tragic loss of his girlfriend, Kimberly, following a car crash. He eventually begins a cautious romance with an intriguing, creative girl, Marley. As strange events begin to unfold around him, Kyle comes to realize that his life with Marley might not be all that it seems.

In July 2020, it was announced that Daughtry and Iaconis are writing the screenplay for what might be another installment in the Dirty Dancing film franchise, for Lionsgate Films. Jonathan Levine and Gillian Bohrer are producing; Jennifer Grey, who played the teenager Baby in the original movie, is executive producing. The movie is said to be set in the 1990s. In August 2022, it was confirmed that the movie is indeed a sequel to Dirty Dancing, with Jennifer Grey starring and Jonathan Levine directing.

In 2021, Daughtry and Iaconis were hired to adapt "The Hallowed Ones," a novel by Lauren Bickle, for producer Emile Gladstone. The story involves an apocalyptic contagion infecting the world outside an Amish teenager's (Katie) idyllic village, turning humans into monstrous predators. Katie must challenge the laws of her religious community in order to save the lives of those she loves.

=== Upcoming work ===
In May 2025 it was announced that Daughtry and Iaconis have been set as the writers for A Walk to Remember, a reboot of Nicholas Sparks' seminal coming-of-age romance, published in 1999. The story follows a rebellious high school senior who falls for a quiet, faith-driven girl after being forced to participate in a school play, discovering the transformative power of love, forgiveness and the beauty of living each day with purpose. Warner Bros. previously adapted the book in 2002, with leads Shane West and Mandy Moore; the Adam Shankman-directed movie remains one of the most popular in the modern rom-com canon. Steve Barnett, Alan Powell, and Vicky Patel are producing the reboot through Monarch Media, along with the original film's producers Denise Di Novi and Hunt Lowry, as well as Margaret French-Isaac through Di Novi Pictures and Patty Reed through Lowry's Roserock Films.

Also in May 2025, Daughtry's new novel, Time After Time, was released by G.P. Putnam's Sons Books for Young Readers, an imprint of Penguin Random House, and was announced as a Good Morning America YA Book Club Pick. The novel follows Libby, a young woman who forgoes college to buy and fix up a Victorian house with her inheritance. After moving in, Libby uncovers the diary of Elizabeth, a woman who lived on the estate a hundred years prior — and whose love story mirrors Libby's in the present day.

In October 2025, it was announced that Santiago Menghini would direct a sequel to The Curse of La Llorona, called The Revenge of La Llorona, written by Sean Tretta, based upon Daughtry and Iaconis' characters, including Raymond Cruz reprising his role as Rafael Olvera. James Wan, Emile Gladstone, and Gary Dauberman were named as producers, and Daughtry and Iaconis will also serve as producers. Principal photography began in October 2025 in Buffalo, New York. The film will be released theatrically on April 9, 2027, by New Line Cinema and Warner Bros. Pictures.

== Filmography ==
Year	Title	Director	Writer	Producer	Notes
2009	Behind Enemy Lines: Colombia	No	Yes	No	
2019	The Curse of La Llorona	No	Yes	No	with Mikki Daughtry
2019	Five Feet Apart	No	Yes	No	with Mikki Daughtry
2021	Nightbooks	No	Yes	No	with Mikki Daughtry
2027	The Revenge of La Llorona	No	No	Yes	with Mikki Daughtry
