= Justin Baldoni =

American actor and director (born 1984)

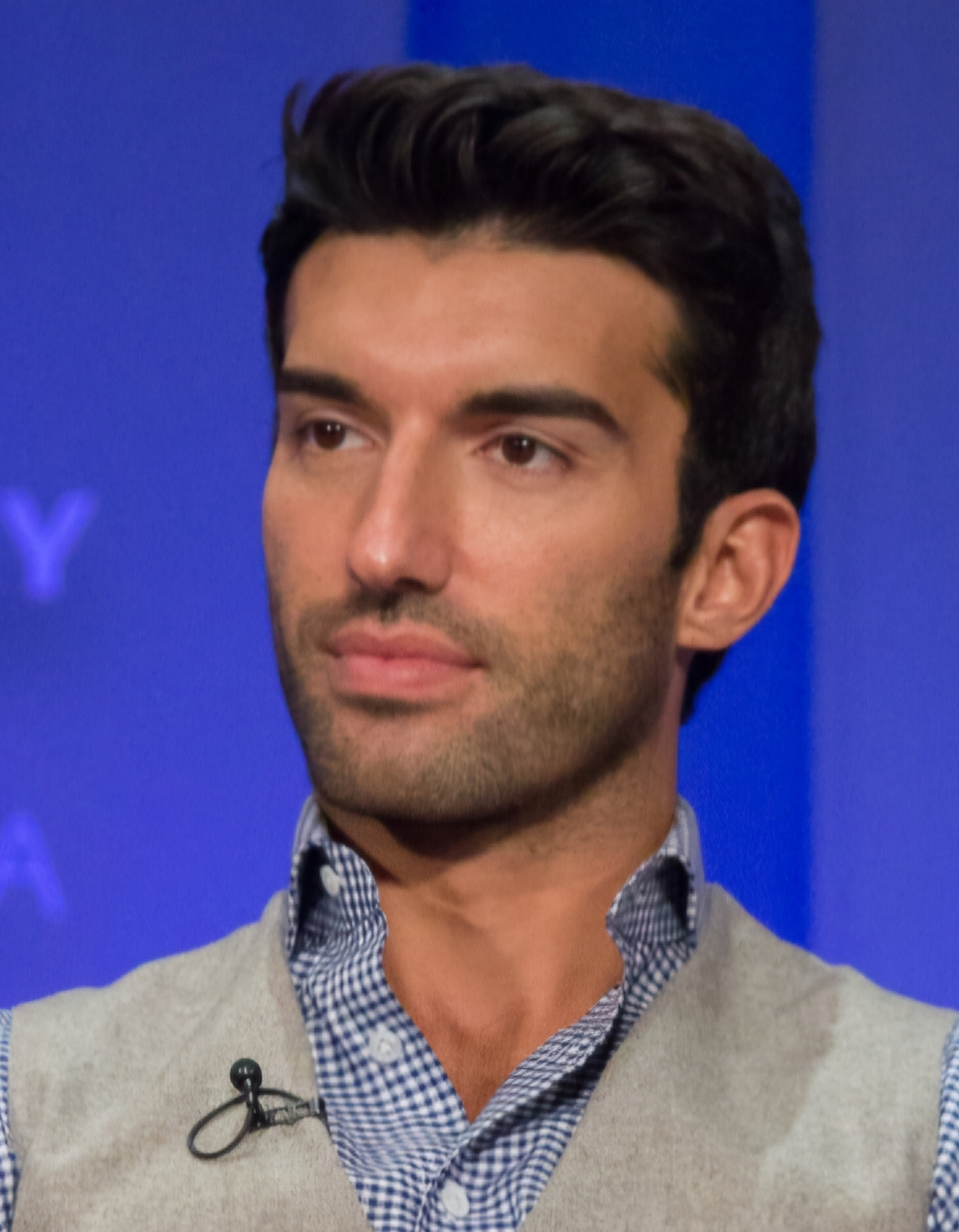
- Baldoni at the 2015 PaleyFest
- Born: Justin Louis Baldoni; January 24, 1984 (age 42); Los Angeles, California, U.S.
- Occupations: Actor; director
- Years active: 2004–present
- Organization: Wayfarer Studios
- Spouse: Emily Foxler (m. 2013)
- Children: 2

Justin Louis Baldoni (born January 24, 1984) is an American actor and director. He is best known for playing Rafael Solano on the CW telenovela Jane the Virgin (2014–2019) and for starring in and directing the romantic drama film It Ends with Us (2024). He has also directed Five Feet Apart (2019) and Clouds (2020).

Baldoni co-founded the production company Wayfarer Studios in 2019. He produced and co-hosted the Man Enough podcast, and published two books on "positive masculinity" and, from his perspective, overcoming societal expectations of being a man.

== Early life ==
Baldoni was born in Los Angeles, California, and was raised in Medford, Oregon, to parents Sharon (née Solomon) and Samuel Baldoni. His mother is Jewish, born to Ashkenazi Jewish parents. His father is from an Italian Catholic background. His paternal grandfather is Louis Baldoni, a former member of the Indiana House of Representatives and the Indiana State Senate.

Baldoni's parents converted to the Baháʼí Faith before he was born but celebrated both Christmas and Hanukkah in honor of their Jewish and Catholic ancestry. He was raised in the Baháʼí Faith and has gone on several Baháʼí pilgrimages to Haifa.

Baldoni played soccer and ran track while he was a student at South Medford High School, and was a radio disc jockey at a local top 40 radio station. While moving into a new apartment building, Baldoni met a manager who advised him to pursue a career in acting. He attended college at California State University, Long Beach (CSULB) on a partial athletic scholarship, but later dropped out. In December 2024, Baldoni alleged he had "experienced sexual trauma" in a previous relationship when he was attending university. He said that he "wrestled with that trauma for the rest of my life, because in my head a man can't experience sexual trauma at the hands of a woman."

== Career ==
=== 2004–2018: Early roles and Jane the Virgin ===
Baldoni made his acting debut in the soap opera The Young and the Restless in 2004.

In 2008, Baldoni wrote, produced, and directed his first music video that was selected and won him his first "Audience Choice Award" at Dawn Breakers International Film Festival. In 2012, Baldoni created a digital documentary series, My Last Days, a show about living—as told by the dying. The show eventually became one of the most-watched YouTube documentary series streamed online. The second season of My Last Days aired on the CW, and the third season was released in the winter of 2018. On the heels of that success, Baldoni founded Wayfarer Entertainment, a digital media studio focused on disruptive inspiration. In December 2018, Baldoni spoke at the annual End Well Symposium about why he believes that thinking about death can help us live better.

From 2014 to 2019, Baldoni played Rafael Solano in the CW satirical telenovela Jane the Virgin, starring opposite Gina Rodriguez. In May 2016, he, along with Travis Van Winkle and Travis Clark, attempted to launch a time-lapse video app for pregnant people to coincide with the finale of Jane the Virgin. In 2018, he played a young Barry Minkow in the crime drama Con Man, directed by Bruce Caulk.

=== 2019–present: Expansion to directing ===
Baldoni directed and produced CBS Films' coming-of-age romantic drama Five Feet Apart, starring Cole Sprouse and Haley Lu Richardson, based on an original script by Mikki Daughtry and Tobias Iaconis. The film was released on March 15, 2019, and chronicles the lives of two teenagers living with cystic fibrosis who fall in love. The film was a financial success but received mixed reviews. The following year, he directed and produced Clouds, a film depicting the life and death of musician Zach Sobiech with Warner Bros. On May 14, 2020, it was announced that Disney+ had acquired distribution rights to the film from Warner Bros., in light of the impact of the COVID-19 pandemic on the film industry. It was released on October 16, 2020.

In 2024, he produced the romantic comedy A Nice Indian Boy, starring Jonathan Groff and Karan Soni. The film follows an Indian doctor, played by Soni, who brings his white boyfriend, played by Groff, to meet his traditional parents. Though it had a modest release and box-office turn worldwide, it was met with universal acclaim by critics. In 2025, the Wayfarer Studios-backed film Eleanor the Great, directed by Scarlett Johansson in her directorial debut and starring June Squibb, had its world premiere at Cannes Film Festival. Baldoni served as executive producer. That year also saw the release of the action-comedy Code 3, directed by Christopher Leone, which Baldoni also produced through Wayfarer.

==== 2024 It Ends with Us controversies ====
In 2024, Baldoni directed and starred in the romantic drama It Ends with Us, based on Colleen Hoover's novel of the same name. In the film, in which he acted opposite Blake Lively, Baldoni portrays a neurosurgeon who is revealed to be a domestic abuser. The film became a box office hit, earning over $350 million, but received mixed reviews from critics. In December 2024, Lively filed a complaint with the California Civil Rights Department, alleging she experienced sexual harassment during filming from Baldoni and others associated with Wayfarer Studios and that there were subsequent attempts to damage her public image.

On December 22, 2024, The New York Times published an article written by investigative reporters Megan Twohey, Mike McIntire, and Julie Tate about Lively's complaint. They reported that Baldoni and producer Jamey Heath hired crisis management experts to "destroy" Lively's reputation through social media campaigns and strategic media placement. Baldoni denied the accusations, and his lawyer, Bryan Freedman, produced a statement describing Lively's claims as "completely false, outrageous and intentionally salacious."

In response to their reporting on the allegations by Lively, Justin Baldoni filed a libel lawsuit for $250 million against The Times. In addition to denying the allegations, Baldoni accused the paper of "working alongside Lively’s team to publish a one-sided article that benefited Lively and contained doctored evidence".

The New York Times defended its reporting, stating "The role of an independent news organization is to follow the facts where they lead. Our story was meticulously and responsibly reported. It was based on a review of thousands of pages of original documents, including the text messages and emails that we quote accurately and at length in the article. To date, Wayfarer Studios, Mr. Baldoni, the other subjects of the article and their representatives have not pointed to a single error. We published their full statement in response to the allegations in the article as well. We plan to vigorously defend against the lawsuit." After Lively filed a lawsuit against Baldoni, he countersued her for $400 million, folding the claims against The Times into the suit. This lawsuit was dismissed in June 2025 as the judge found Baldoni had not shown the paper "acted with actual malice - the legal standard a public figure like Mr. Baldoni must meet to prove libel - in publishing the article". In September 2025, the New York Times filed a lawsuit against Baldoni's production company to recoup legal costs under New York State's anti-SLAPP laws.

In April 2026, the court dismissed 10 of Lively's 13 claims, including her sexual harassment allegations against Baldoni, thereby removing him and all individual associates from the lawsuit. Lively voluntarily dismissed her remaining claims of retaliation and breach of contract, resolving the case in a settlement in May 2026 without any monetary exchange.

In June 2026, a federal judge ruled that Lively was entitled to recover her legal fees from Wayfarer Studios, Baldoni’s production company, from only the defamation claim in their countersuit, but she was not entitled any damages for harm caused by his defamation claims. In August 2026, U.S. District Judge Lewis J. Liman ruled that Lively "was entitled only to the reasonable fees and costs necessary to defend against the defamation claim" and awarded her $400,000.

=== Representation ===
The talent agency, WME, signed Baldoni in March 2019. The agency, which also represents Lively and her husband Ryan Reynolds, dropped Baldoni in December 2024, following news of Lively's complaint. Baldoni has alleged that Reynolds and Lively pressured the agency to drop him, which the agency denied. In April 2026, WME released a public statement in support of Lively's case, stating it, "helped expose the devastating harm caused by covert digital takedown campaigns designed to intimidate, discredit, and drown out the truth."

== Other ventures ==
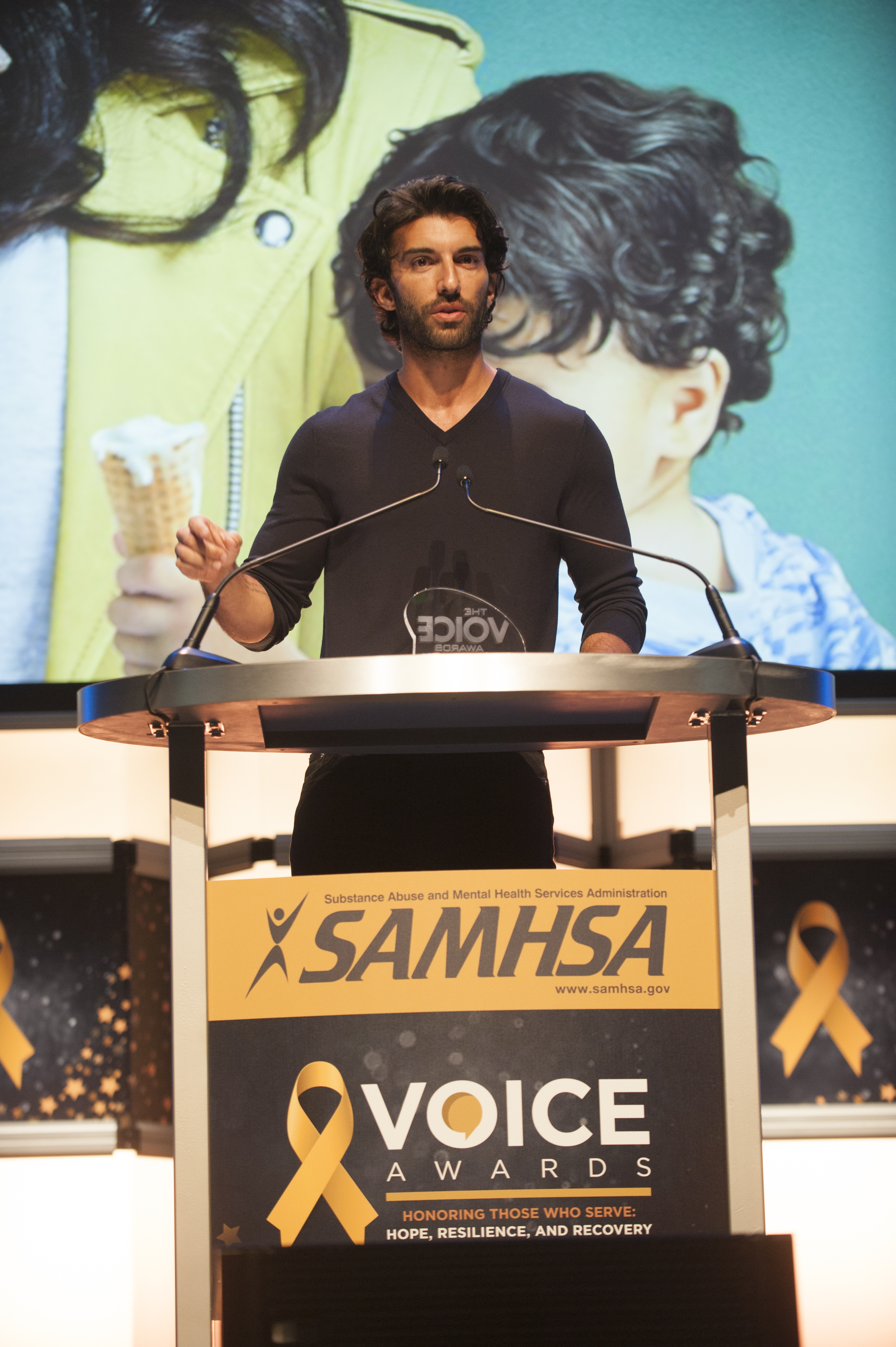
Justin Baldoni at the 2017 SAMHSA award ceremony

=== Man Enough projects ===
In 2017, Baldoni gave a TED talk called "Why I’m Done Trying to Be 'Man Enough,'" which went on to inspire a web series.

In July 2017, Variety announced that Baldoni was developing a talk show through his media company Wayfarer Entertainment. The show, entitled Man Enough, is described as a disruptive panel series that explores what it means to be a man today. Eight 25-minute episodes were to be distributed on the internet. In 2021, Baldoni released a book under the same premise. A children's version of the book, Boys Will Be Human, was released in October 2022.

In June 2021, it was announced that Wayfarer was launching The Man Enough Podcast in partnership with Procter & Gamble. Baldoni led the podcast series with co-hosts Liz Plank and Jamey Heath. It was an honoree at the 2022 Weebly Awards. Plank left the podcast in 2024 after The New York Times reported allegations that Baldoni sexually harassed Blake Lively. Plank wrote in a statement, "I will continue to support everyone who calls out injustice and holds the people standing in their way accountable".

=== Wayfarer Studios ===
Baldoni and Steve Sarowitz co-founded a production company called Wayfarer Entertainment, named for a phrase used by the founder of the Baháʼí faith, that produces television, films, and digital content. In 2019, Wayfarer sold a majority stake in the company to investment fund 4S Bay Partners, setting up a $25 million content fund, and was renamed Wayfarer Studios in 2020. In 2022, the studio received a $125 million investment from Sarowitz. The studio's most successful project to date is the 2024 romance drama It Ends with Us, that Baldoni directs and stars in. The film grossed $351 million at the box office. The studio partnered with the nonprofit No More to provide resources and information related to domestic abuse and violence such as that shown in the film.

In 2014, Baldoni through Wayfarer Studios' philanthropic branch, Wayfarer Foundation started the annual Skid Row Carnival of Love in downtown Los Angeles. The event served between 4,000 and 5,000 homeless individuals living around Skid Row, providing career services such as "housing services, domestic violence services, dental and medical exams, an eye clinic, haircuts, and massages" and other festivities such as face-painting, live concerts, and children's activities. The Foundation was shuttered in May 2025.

== Personal life ==
After almost two years of dating, Baldoni married Swedish actress Emily Foxler, now known as Emily Baldoni. He proposed to her in a 27-minute video, which he released on his production company's YouTube channel where it went viral. He described it as "his first movie". The couple married in July 2013 in Corona, California. They have a daughter and a son together.

Baldoni is a member of the Baháʼí Faith and has stated that for him it is a "daily source of inner happiness". He has stated that he has Attention deficit hyperactivity disorder (ADHD). He has previously written and spoken about his struggles with body dysmorphic disorder (BDD). Baldoni is on the Board of Ambassadors of the Tahirih Justice Center, a nonprofit organization advocating for women, girls, and all immigrant survivors of gender-based violence.

== Filmography ==
=== Film ===
Year	Title	Role	Notes	Ref.
2005	Yesterday's Dream	Pat		
2005	The Helix...Loaded	Jason		
2008	The House Bunny	Waiter		
2009	After Dusk They Come	Peter		
2009	Alpha Males Experiment	Gavin		
2010	Unrequited	Todd Brown		
2011	Royal Reunion	Nicky	Short film	
2011	Intervention: Cinderella	Aladdin	Short film	
2013	Isolated	Ambassador for Peace		
2013	Not Today	Eli Hill		
2013	The Proposal	Justin	Short film	
2014	A Fine Step	Marzo Bolivar		
2018	Con Man	Young Barry Minkow		
2019	Five Feet Apart	—N/a	Director; also executive producer	
2020	Clouds	—N/a	Director	
2023	The Senior	—N/a	Producer	
2024	The Garfield Movie	—N/a	Executive producer	
2024	Ezra	—N/a	Executive producer	
2024	It Ends with Us	Ryle Kincaid	Also director and executive producer	
2024	Will & Harper	—N/a	Executive producer	
2024	A Nice Indian Boy	—N/a	Producer	
2025	Eleanor the Great	—N/a	Executive producer	
2025	Code 3	—N/a	Producer	

=== Television ===
Year	Title	Role	Notes
2004	The Young and the Restless	Ben	Three episodes
2004	Wedding Daze	Guillermo Valerio	Television film
2005	JAG	Azzam	Episode: "Bridging the Gulf"
2005	Spring Break Shark Attack	J.T.	Television film
2005	Charmed	Salko	Episode: "Something Wicca This Way Goes"
2005–2006	Everwood	Reid Bardem	15 episodes
2007	CSI: Miami	Damon Argento	Episode: "Cyber-Lebrity"
2008	The Suite Life of Zack & Cody	Diego	Episode: "Foiled Again"
2009	Heroes	Alex Woolsey	Episodes: "Building 26" and "Exposed"
2010	The Bold and the Beautiful	Graham Darros	10 episodes
2010	CSI: NY	Heath Kirkfield	Episode: "Out of the Sky"
2011–2012	Single Ladies	Derek	Four episodes
2012	Blackout	Josh Martin	TV miniseries
2012	Shadow of Fear	Bobby	Television film
2012	Undercover Bridesmaid	Jake	Television film
2013	Happy Endings	Marcus	Episode: "Fowl Play/Date"
2014–2019	Jane the Virgin	Rafael Solano	Main role; 99 episodes
2017	Madam Secretary	Kevin Park	Two episodes

== Bibliography ==
- Man Enough: Undefining My Masculinity (HarperOne, 2021)
- Boys Will Be Human: A Get-Real Gut-Check Guide to Becoming the Strongest, Kindest, Bravest Person You Can Be (Harper Collins, 2022)

== Sources ==
- Wagmeister, Elizabeth (August 17, 2016). "'Jane the Virgin' Star Justin Baldoni Focuses on Filmmaking for a Good Cause With 'My Last Days'". Variety.
- Wagmeister, Elizabeth (July 6, 2017). "'Jane the Virgin' Star Justin Baldoni Developing Men's Talk Show (EXCLUSIVE)". Variety.
