= The Curse of La Llorona =

2019 film by Michael Chaves

- Theatrical release poster
- Directed by: Michael Chaves
- Written by: Mikki Daughtry; Tobias Iaconis
- Produced by: James Wan; Gary Dauberman; Emile Gladstone
- Starring: Linda Cardellini; Raymond Cruz; Patricia Velásquez
- Cinematography: Michael Burgess
- Edited by: Peter Gvozdas
- Music by: Joseph Bishara
- Production companies: New Line Cinema; Atomic Monster; Emile Gladstone Productions
- Distributed by: Warner Bros. Pictures
- Release dates: March 15, 2019 (SXSW); April 19, 2019 (United States)
- Running time: 93 minutes
- Country: United States
- Languages: English; Spanish
- Budget: $9 million
- Box office: $123.2 million

The Curse of La Llorona (also known as The Curse of the Weeping Woman in some markets) is a 2019 American supernatural horror film directed by Michael Chaves, in his feature directorial debut, and written by Mikki Daughtry and Tobias Iaconis. Based on the Latin American folklore of La Llorona, the film stars Linda Cardellini, Raymond Cruz, and Patricia Velásquez, and follows a mother in 1973 Los Angeles who must save her children from a malevolent spirit trying to steal them. The film was produced by James Wan through his Atomic Monster banner and, though not considered an installment in the franchise, takes place within The Conjuring Universe.

The Curse of La Llorona premiered at South by Southwest on March 15, 2019, and was theatrically released in the United States on April 19, 2019. It received mostly unfavorable reviews but was a surprise success at the box office, grossing $123.1 million worldwide against a $9 million budget. A sequel, The Revenge of La Llorona, is set to be released on February 26, 2027.

== Plot ==
In 1673, Spanish Mexico, a family plays in a field, and the youngest son gives his mother a necklace, who says she will treasure the item forever. The boy goes on a hike a while later and finds his mother violently drowning his brother in a stream. Horrified, he runs, but his mother catches him; he is assumed to be drowned as well.

Three hundred years later, in 1973 Los Angeles, recently widowed caseworker Anna investigates the truancy of client Patricia Alvarez's two children. Arriving at Patricia's house for a welfare check, she finds the children locked behind a door. After she insisted and though she was warned to get away from the door, Patricia attacks her and is taken away by the police. Patricia's sons, Carlos and Tomas, tell Anna to keep them in the room, so they are protected. Ignoring their warnings, she takes them to the child-services shelter. There, Tomas sleepwalks, and Carlos follows him until both boys see a woman in a white dress who attacks them. The boys are found drowned in a river, and Anna is called out to the scene. She brings her own children, Chris and Sam, and they stay in the car while she investigates. She hears Patricia, accused of her sons' murders, screaming that it was Anna's fault for taking her sons and that Patricia had tried to stop a malevolent force that she names "La Llorona".

Chris leaves the car out of curiosity and encounters a weeping woman, who seizes his wrist and leaves burns. She stalks him back to the car, but leaves once Anna returns and the family flees the scene. The next day, Anna meets with Father Perez about whether or not to believe the myth of La Llorona. In the process, Anna and her family begin to experience a series of unexplained incidents. La Llorona also grabs Sam and leaves identical burn marks the next day. Anna interviews Patricia, who has an alibi for the time of her sons' deaths. However, Patricia reveals that in her hatred for Anna, she prayed to La Llorona to bring her own boys back and take Anna's children instead. Soon after, Anna encounters La Llorona when the spirit attempts to drown Sam in the bathtub. The ghost leaves burn marks on Anna's arm too. Anna seeks help from Father Perez, who relates the case to his previous experiences with a haunted porcelain doll. Perez tells Anna about former priest Rafael Olvera, who has since become a folk shaman or curandero, who may be able to help them. Rafael arrives at Anna's house, setting up items for protection. In the night, La Llorona repeatedly attacks them and attempts to drown Anna and Sam in the pool after Sam cannot seem to let go of her Doll, thus endangering the family further. Anna pulls off La Llorona's necklace in the struggle.

Patricia arrives with a gun and tries to give Anna's children to La Llorona. Sam and Chris flee. Patricia, realizing that she can't let another mother feel the same pain she felt or bring her children back to life, comes to her senses and releases Anna, allowing her to help her children. Chris delays La Llorona by showing her the necklace that La Llorona's son had given her. This makes La Llorona briefly assume her human appearance and caress Chris, imagining him to be her real son. However, Sam accidentally unveils a mirror, and La Llorona reverts and proceeds to attack them. Anna stabs her through the chest with a cross given by Rafael, made from a tree that grew by the river where La Llorona drowned her children; the only "witness" to her crime. The spirit is destroyed.

Anna and her children thank Rafael for his help. When he leaves, Anna looks down into a puddle of water beside the road.

== Cast ==
- Linda Cardellini as Anna Tate-Garcia
- Roman Christou as Chris Garcia
- Jaynee-Lynne Kinchen as Samantha Garcia
- Raymond Cruz as Rafael Olvera
- Marisol Ramirez as La Llorona
- Patricia Velásquez as Patricia Alvarez
- Sean Patrick Thomas as Detective Cooper
- Tony Amendola as Father Perez
- Irene Keng as Donna
- Oliver Alexander as Carlos
- Aiden Lewandowski as Tomas
- Paul Rodriguez as Officer Claro
- John Marshall Jones as Mr. Hankins
- Ricardo Mamood-Vega as Perez
- Jaydan Valdivia as Diego

== Production ==
In October 2017, New Line Cinema announced to distribute a horror film directed by Michael Chaves, with James Wan as well as It and Annabelle writer Gary Dauberman serving as producers. Then titled The Children, by July 2018, the film was renamed The Curse of La Llorona. Linda Cardellini was cast to play a single mother and the lead character. Sean Patrick Thomas and Raymond Cruz co-starred in the film.

After the first trailer's release, it was revealed that Tony Amendola was returning as Father Perez, last seen in the film Annabelle. The character gives direction to the family being tormented by the titular spirit and relates the haunting to his experiences with the demonic entity attached to the doll. Despite this, Chaves has repeatedly stated that the film is not an official entry into The Conjuring Universe franchise.

Principal photography on the film wrapped in November 2017.

== Release ==
The Curse of La Llorona was theatrically released in the United States and several other territories on April 19, 2019, by Warner Bros. Pictures and New Line Cinema. It had its world premiere at South by Southwest on March 15, 2019. The studio spent an estimated $35–40 million on domestic advertisements for the film.

The Curse of La Llorona was released on Digital HD on July 16, 2019, and was released on Blu-ray and DVD on August 6, 2019.

In May 2019, the Guzzo Marché Central Movie Theatre in Montreal, screened the film instead of the originally scheduled Detective Pikachu, which prompted a room swap.

== Reception ==
=== Box office ===
The Curse of La Llorona grossed $54.7 million in the United States and Canada, and $68.4 million in other territories, for a worldwide total of $123.1 million, against a production budget of $9 million. Deadline Hollywood calculated the net profit of the film to be $45.6 million, when factoring together all expenses and revenues.

In the United States and Canada, the film was released alongside Under the Silver Lake and was projected to gross $15–17 million from 3,372 theaters in its opening weekend. It made $11.8 million on its first day, including $2.75 million from Thursday night previews. It went on to over-perform, grossing $26.5 million in its opening weekend and topping the box office; 49% of the audience was Hispanic. In its second weekend, the film fell 69.5% to $8 million, finishing third.

=== Critical response ===
On the review aggregator website Rotten Tomatoes, 26% of 188 critics' reviews are positive, with an average rating of 4.5/10. The website's consensus reads: "Content to coast on jump scares rather than tap into its story's creepy potential, The Curse of La Llorona arrives in theaters already broken." Metacritic, which uses a weighted average, assigned the film a score of 41 out of 100, based on 28 critics, indicating "mixed or average" reviews. Audiences polled by CinemaScore gave the film an average grade of "B−" on an A+ to F scale, while those at PostTrak gave it 2.5 out of 5 stars and a "definite recommend" of 48%.

=== Accolades ===
Award nominations for The Curse of La Llorona
Year	Award	Category	Nominee(s)	Result
2019	Golden Trailer Awards	Best Horror Poster	The Curse of La Llorona	Nominated
2019	MTV Movie & TV Awards	Most Frightened Performance	Linda Cardellini	Nominated

== Sequel ==
On October 9, 2025, it was announced that Santiago Menghini would direct the film from a script by Sean Tretta, with Monica Raymund, Jay Hernandez, Raymond Cruz, Edy Ganem, Martín Fajardo, Acston Luca Porto and Avie Porto as the lead roles. Principal photography began in October 2025 in Buffalo, New York. The film is scheduled to be released in the United States on February 26, 2027.
