= CBS Films =

American film production and distribution company

CBS Films Inc.
- Final logo, used from 2011 to 2019
- Type: Subsidiary
- Industry: Film
- Predecessor: CBS Theatrical Films
- Founded: March 2007; 19 years ago
- Founder: Leslie Moonves
- Defunct: December 4, 2019; 6 years ago
- Fate: Folded into CBS Entertainment Group
- Successor: CBS Studios (television production); Paramount Pictures (theatrical releases)
- Headquarters: Brentwood, Los Angeles, California, United States
- Key people: Terry Press (president)
- Products: Feature films
- Number of employees: 2 (as of 2019)
- Parent: CBS Corporation

CBS Films Inc. was an American film production and distribution company founded in 2007 as a subsidiary of CBS Corporation and was considered a mini-major studio up until 2019.

CBS Films originally was planned to distribute, develop and produce four to six $50 million budget films a year. After October 11, 2019, CBS Films was re-configured to be a production company for television films to be carried by CBS All Access (now Paramount+).

== Background ==
The CBS network had formed a previous CBS Films, Inc. as its syndication arm in 1952, which was later renamed CBS Enterprises in 1968, then later Viacom two years later, but due to fin-syn law being upheld in 1972, CBS was forced to spin off the company. CBS made a brief move into film production in 1967, creating Cinema Center Films and closed in 1972 as an unprofitable unit. In 1979 CBS launched a new theatrical films division, which was officially named CBS Theatrical Films the following year. While this was in operation, CBS entered into a joint venture with Columbia Pictures and HBO called Tri-Star Pictures. CBS eventually dropped out of the venture in 1985, and CBS Theatrical Films came to an end that same year. In 2000, CBS was bought by Viacom, which also owned Paramount Pictures.

== Company history ==
In March 2007, following the 2005 split from Viacom which retained Paramount, CBS Corporation launched CBS Films with the hiring of Bruce Tobey as head of business affairs, legal, finance and video distribution. Amy Baer was hired in September 2007 as president and CEO for CBS Films. With CBS retaining ownership of Showtime and Viacom deciding to launch Epix in 2009 with Paramount films, this division was created to make content for the channel. On November 17, 2009, CBS signed with Sony Pictures for a three-year deal for international distribution.

The studio's launch seemed to well timed to its executives with the closure or restructuring of many film studios including the formerly prominent Metro-Goldwyn-Mayer (MGM), Miramax Films and Warner Independent Pictures. Also CBS was able to well market its films with all its parent corporation's advertising channels from broadcast to billboards.

The studio released its first film, Extraordinary Measures, on January 22, 2010. CBS Films released its second film, a romantic comedy The Back-up Plan, in April 2010. Opening over the five-day Thanksgiving weekend, Faster, its third film and the Dwayne Johnson action flick, was weak at the box office with a $12 million start. In August, the company purchased distribution rights for the first time for the remake movie, The Mechanic. CBS moved to replace Bruce Tobey, chief operations officer, with Wolfgang Hammer in November 2010.

After releasing five films and only one gross over $30 million, CBS Films decided to change direction and become an acquirer of films rather than a producer in March 2011. Baer was released after the ended of her contract in October, with a trio of senior executives left to head up the division.

On April 23, 2012, CBS Films named Hammer and Terry Press as co-presidents. Press, who had been consulting for the studio since 2010, oversees creative, distribution, marketing and physical production. Hammer will oversees all business, finance, legal affairs and acquisitions, including financed, co-financed and completed projects for the division. Hammer moved CBS Films into becoming a major film acquisition mover thus allowing internal projects to development more. CBS's highest profile purchase was $4 million for Inside Llewyn Davis which won Cannes' Grand Prix and nominations for two Academy and 3 Golden Globe awards.

On July 22, 2014, Hammer moved from being co-president to being a consultant for digital. In 2015, Lionsgate took over CBS Films' American distribution and global sales functions. In 2017, Deadline.com reported CBS Films would finance Jane the Virgin actor Justin Baldoni's first directing/producing effort based on an original script by Mikki Daughtry and Tobias Iaconis.

On January 12, 2019, it was reported that CBS Films would release four theatrical films in 2019, then be folded into the main CBS Entertainment Group, switching its focus to creating original film content for CBS All Access. Jexi was CBS Films' final theatrical release on October 11, 2019. The ViacomCBS merger, which closed on December 4, 2019, returned Paramount Pictures to being a sister company of CBS, making a theatrical subsidiary for the network superfluous.

== See also ==
- Cinema Center Films
- CBS Theatrical Films
