= Mikki Daughtry =

American screenwriter and author

Mikki Daughtry is an American screenwriter and young adult fiction author. She is best known for writing, along with writing partner Tobias Iaconis, the films The Curse of La Llorona (2019), Five Feet Apart (2019) and Nightbooks (2021).

== Biography ==
Daughtry is from Georgia. She studied theater arts at Brenau University, where she graduated in 2001.

She has written three screenplays that have been produced: Five Feet Apart, The Curse Of La Llorona, and Nightbooks, all of which she and her screenwriting partner Tobias Iaconis co-wrote. The first two films were released in 2019, and Nightbooks was released in 2021. She and Iaconis had been working together for nearly a decade when Five Feet Apart came out.

A 2018 novelization of Five Feet Apart, written by Rachael Lippincott with Daughtry and Iaconis, was a New York Times bestseller.

Daughtry subsequently wrote the young adult novel All This Time with Lippincott, published in 2020. Her next young adult novel, the century-spanning lesbian romance Time After Time, is forthcoming in 2025.
