= List of Jane the Virgin characters =

Jane the Virgin is an American satirical romantic comedy-drama telenovela. It premiered on The CW on October 13, 2014. The series was developed by Jennie Snyder Urman. The following is a list of characters who appeared over the various seasons.

== Main characters ==
=== Overview ===
| Actor | Character | Seasons | | | | |
| Actor | Character | 1 | 2 | 3 | 4 | 5 |
|---|---|---|---|---|---|---|
| Gina Rodriguez | Jane Gloriana Solano, née Villanueva, formerly Cordero | Main | Main | Main | Main | Main |
| Andrea Navedo | Xiomara Gloriana de la Vega, née Villanueva | Main | Main | Main | Main | Main |
| Yael Grobglas | Petra Solano | Main | Main | Main | Main | Main |
| Justin Baldoni | Rafael Solano | Main | Main | Main | Main | Main |
| Ivonne Coll | Alba Villanueva | Main | Main | Main | Main | Main |
| Brett Dier | Michael Cordero, Jr | Main (Note: In season 3, Brett Dier is credited as a series regular through the eleventh episode and in the twentieth episode.) | Main | Main | Guest | Main (Note: In season 5, Brett Dier is credited as a series regular through the seventh episode and in the seventeenth episode.) |
| Jaime Camil | Rogelio De La Vega | Main | Main | Main | Main | Main |
| Joseph Sanders | Mateo Solano Villanueva, born Mateo Gloriano Rogelio Solano Villanueva | | | Also starring | | |
| Elias Janssen | Mateo Solano Villanueva, born Mateo Gloriano Rogelio Solano Villanueva | | | | Main | Main |

=== Jane Villanueva ===
Jane Gloriana Villanueva (Gina Rodriguez) is a devoted Catholic who has vowed to her grandmother, Alba, to preserve her virginity until marriage. She is engaged to Michael Cordero. Due to a mix-up at the gynecologist's clinic, Jane finds herself accidentally artificially inseminated with the sperm of Rafael Solano, who also happens to be the owner of the hotel at which Jane works, and Jane soon falls in love with him. Over the course of the first season, Jane also becomes acquainted with her father, telenovela star, Rogelio De La Vega, who was previously unaware of his daughter's existence. Jane puts her plan to become a teacher aside as she adjusts to life with a new-born and pursues her dream of writing.

=== Xiomara Villanueva ===
Xiomara Gloriana De La Vega (née Villanueva) (portrayed by Andrea Navedo) is Jane's laid back mother, and Alba's daughter. Unlike her mother and daughter, Xiomara is less conservative around sex, losing her virginity at a young age and having Jane at 16. She and Jane's father, Rogelio De La Vega, were high school sweethearts until he moved away, and she chose to not tell him about the pregnancy.

=== Petra Solano ===
Petra Solano, born Natalia Anděl (portrayed by Yael Grobglas) is from the Czech Republic. She ran away and took on a new identity with her mother, Magda, in order to hide from her abusive boyfriend, Miloš. Petra becomes engaged to Lachlan Moore before leaving him for Rafael Solano.

=== Rafael Solano ===
Rafael Solano (portrayed by Justin Baldoni) is a former playboy and owner of the Marbella Hotel, married to Petra. After a miscarriage and his cancer diagnosis the couple begins to fall apart. With Rafael plotting to leave her, Petra decides to artificially inseminate herself with his sperm sample, only for his sister, Luisa, to accidentally inseminate Jane Villanueva.

=== Alba Villanueva ===
Alba Gloriana Villanueva (portrayed by Ivonne Coll) is the deeply religious matriarch of the Villaunueva household. Alba's late husband, Mateo, left money behind for Alba after dying. She spends the series slowly adapting to a less conservative lifestyle and embracing all life has left to offer her. Her love for her family is intense and huge, and as the show progresses she decides to extend that love to potential romances.

=== Michael Cordero, Jr. ===
Jane's fiancé at the beginning of the series. Michael is initially the head detective in the hunt for Sin Rostro, a high-profile drug dealer who seems to be based in the Marbella. Shot on his wedding night in the shoulder, close to the heart, he becomes hospitalized; complications from the shooting result in him becoming bedridden for a long time. Because of this, he can no longer continue his job as a policeman and retrains as a lawyer. It is not long after this, however, that the same complications that left him hospitalised come back to haunt him, and he unexpectedly passes away due to heart failure.

=== Rogelio De La Vega ===
A self-involved, famous telenovela star and Jane's biological father. He is trying to form a relationship with his newly discovered daughter.

=== Mateo Gloriano Rogelio Solano Villanueva ===
Jane and Rafael's child. Named after Jane's grandfather and Alba's husband, who died before Jane was born. During the fifth season, Mateo is diagnosed with attention-deficit-hyperactivity-disorder (ADHD).

== Recurring characters ==
=== Overview ===
| Actor | Character | Seasons | | | | |
| Actor | Character | 1 | 2 | 3 | 4 | 5 |
|---|---|---|---|---|---|---|
| Yara Martinez | Luisa Alver | Recurring | Recurring | Recurring | Recurring | Recurring |
| Bridget Regan | Rose Solano/ Susannah Barnett/ Eileen | Recurring | Recurring | Recurring | Recurring | Recurring |
| Megan Ketch | Rose Solano/ Susannah Barnett/ Eileen | | Recurring (Note: Megan Ketch portrays Rose while wearing a mask of Susanna Barnett.) | | | |
| Elisabeth Röhm | Rose Solano/ Susannah Barnett/ Eileen | | | Recurring (Note: Elisabeth Röhm portrays Rose while wearing a mask of Eileen.) | | Recurring (Note: Elisabeth Röhm portrays Rose while wearing a mask of Eileen.) |
| Diane Guerrero | Lina Santillan | Recurring | Recurring | Recurring | Guest | Recurring |
| Alano Miller | Roman Zazo | Recurring | | | Guest | |
| Alano Miller | Aaron Zazo | Guest | | | | |
| Priscilla Barnes | Magda Anděl | Recurring | Recurring | Recurring | Recurring | Recurring |
| Carlo Rota | Emilio Solano | Recurring | | | | |
| Azie Tesfai | Nadine Hanson | Recurring | Recurring | | | |
| Camille Collard | Frankie | Recurring | | | | |
| Brian Dare | Luca | Recurring | Recurring | | Guest | |
| Chris Corbin | Ivan Rogachevsky | Recurring | Recurring | | | |
| Max Bird-Ridnell | Miloš Dvořáček | Recurring | Recurring | | | Recurring |
| Keller Wortham | Esteban Santiago | Recurring | Recurring | Recurring | Recurring | Recurring |
| Wes Armstrong | Scott Archuletta | Recurring | Recurring | Recurring | | |
| Fabiana Udenio | Elena Di Nola | Recurring | Recurring | Guest | | |
| Shelly Bhalla | Krishna Dhawan | | Recurring | Recurring | Recurring | Recurring |
| Dennis Mencia | Mateo Villanueva I | | Recurring | | Guest | |
| Adam Rodriguez | Jonathan Chavez | | Recurring | | Guest | |
| Mat Vairo | Derek Ruvelle | | Recurring | | | |
| Uncredited baby actors | Anna and Elsa "Ellie" Solano | | Recurring | Recurring | | |
| Mia and Ella Allan | Anna and Elsa "Ellie" Solano | | | Recurring | Recurring | Recurring |
| Melanie Mayron | Marlene Donaldson | | Recurring | Recurring | Recurring | Recurring |
| Molly Hagan | Patricia Cordero | | Recurring | Guest | Guest | Recurring |
| Yael Grobglas | Anežka Archuletta | | Recurring | Recurring | Recurring | |
| Alfonso DiLuca | Jorge Garcia | | | Recurring | Recurring | Recurring |
| Sofia Pernas | Catalina Mora | | | Recurring | | |
| Ricardo Chavira | Bruce | | | Recurring | | |
| Justina Machado | Darci Factor | | | Recurring | Recurring | Recurring |
| Christopher Allen | Dennis Chambers | | | Recurring | | Recurring |
| Johnny Messner | Chuck Chesser | | | Recurring | Guest | |
| Francisco San Martín | Fabian Regalo del Cielo | | | Recurring | Recurring | |
| Tyler Posey | Adam Alvaro | | | Guest | Recurring | |
| Uncredited baby actors | Baby De La Vega Factor | | | | Recurring | Recurring |
| Rosario Dawson | Jane Ramos | | | | Recurring | Recurring |
| Brooke Shields | River Fields | | | | Recurring | Recurring |
| Tommy Dorfman | Bobby | | | | | Recurring |

=== Introduced in season one ===
==== Luisa Alver ====
Luisa Alver (portrayed by Yara Martinez) is the doctor who artificially inseminated Jane, as well as Rafael's sister. She is an alcoholic and in love with her stepmother, Rose. The two have an on and off relationship, then spend three years together until Rose is found and arrested.

==== Rose Solano ====
Rose Solano (portrayed by Bridget Regan) is a crime lord who falls in love with Luisa, and is the main antagonist of the series. She kills Emilio, kidnaps Mateo, and shoots Michael. After three years on the run with Luisa, she is arrested.

==== Emilio Solano ====
Emilio Solano (portrayed by Carlo Rota, season 1) is Rafael's adoptive father and Luisa's biological father. He owns the Marbella.

==== Magda Anděl ====
Magda Anděl (portrayed by Priscilla Barnes) is Petra's scheming mother who fakes paralysis. She pushes Alba down a flight of stairs and kills Ivan, winding up arrested on both occasions.

==== Lina Santillan ====
Lina Santillan (portrayed by Diane Guerrero) is Jane's best friend and co-worker at the Marbella. Despite Lina having moved to New York and having married Danny, the two remain close.

==== Nadine Hanson ====
Nadine Hanson (portrayed by Azie Tesfai, seasons 1–2) is Michael's partner who turns out to be working for Sin Rostro.

==== Frankie and Luca ====
Frankie (portrayed by Camille Collard, season 1) and Luca (portrayed by Brian Dare, seasons 1, 2, 4) are Jane's friends who worked at the Marbella.

==== Lachlan Moore ====
Lachlan Moore (portrayed by Michael Rady, seasons 1–2) is Rafael's rival and Petra's former fiancé.

==== Roman and Aaron Zazo ====
Roman and Aaron Zazo (portrayed by Alano Miller, seasons 1 and 4)

Roman and Aaron Zazo are twin brothers. Roman has an affair with Petra.

==== Ivan Rogachevsky ====
Ivan Rogachevsky (portrayed by Chris Corbin, seasons 1–2) is Miloš' goon hired to track down Petra and Magda.

==== Miloš Dvořáček ====
Miloš Dvořáček (portrayed by Max Bird-Ridnell, seasons 1, 2 and 5) is Petra's abusive boyfriend from the Czech Republic. Petra and her mother flee the country with new identities to get away from him.

==== Scott Archuletta ====
Scott Archuletta (portrayed by Wes Armstrong, seasons 1-3) is the Marbella's sleazy lounge manager. He keeps a burn book on the Marbella, and eventually marries Anežka.

==== Esteban Santiago ====
Esteban Santiago (portrayed by Keller Wortham, seasons 1–2, 4-5) is Rogelio's acting rival.

==== Dina Milagro ====
Dina Milagro (portrayed by Judy Reyes, seasons 1–3, 5) is the head writer of The Passions of Santos. She briefly dates Rogelio and later returns as the head writer of This Is Mars.

==== Elena Di Nola ====
Elena Di Nola (Fabiana Udenio, seasons 1–3): Emilio's second wife and Rafael's adoptive mother, she is a crime lord that rivals Rose.

==== Regina ====
Regina (Layla Alizada, seasons 1 and 4) is Jane's friend and co-worker at the Marbella. She has two kids. She eventually takes over Jane's job as lounge manager when Jane leaves after ghostwriting Petra's lifestyle book.

=== Introduced in season two ===
==== Krishna Dhawan ====
Krishna Dhawan (portrayed by Shelly Bhalla, seasons 2–5) is Petra's (formerly Rafael's) assistant.

==== Mateo Villanueva ====
Mateo Villanueva (portrayed by Dennis Mencia, seasons 2 and 4) is Alba's late husband, Xiomara's father, and Jane's grandfather.

==== Jonathan Chavez ====
Jonathan Chavez (portrayed by Adam Rodriguez, seasons 2 and 4): Jane's mentor who she has a brief relationship with.

==== Anna and Ellie Solano ====
Anna & Ellie Solano (portrayed by uncredited baby actors, seasons 2–3; Mia and Ella Allan, seasons 3–5) are Petra and Rafael's twin daughters.

==== Anežka Archuletta ====
Anežka Archuletta (portrayed by Yael Grobglas, seasons 2–4) is Petra's long lost twin sister who paralyzes Petra and steals her identity.

==== Derek Ruvelle ====
Derek Ruvelle (portrayed by Mat Vairo, season 2): Elena's son who was at one point believed to be Rafael's half-brother.

==== Rudy ====
Rudy (portrayed by Rudy Martinez) is Rogelio's personal assistant.

==== Patricia Cordero ====
Patricia Cordero (portrayed by Molly Hagan, seasons 2–5): Michael's mother who has a poor relationship with Jane.

==== Marlene Donaldson ====
Marlene Donaldson (portrayed by Melanie Mayron, seasons 2–5) is Jane's mentor when looking to become a writer.

=== Introduced in season three ===
==== Dennis Chambers ====
Dennis Chambers (portrayed by Christopher Allen) is Michael's best friend and the detective in charge of investigating Scott's death.

==== Jorge Garcia ====
Jorge (portrayed by Alfonso DiLuca) is Alba's co-worker at the Marbella giftshop. The two enter into a relationship after Alba spends three years having a crush on him.

==== Bruce ====
Bruce (portrayed by Ricardo Chavira) is a married man Xiomara used to have an affair with. When he finally gets a divorce, he and Xiomara enter into a relationship, but the couple is met with disapproval by both Xo's daughter Jane and Bruce's daughter Tess.

==== Catalina Maria Mora ====
Catalina Maria Mora (portrayed by Sofia Pernas): Jane's opportunist cousin who has a brief fling with Rafael.

==== Darci Factor ====
Darci Factor (portrayed by Justina Machado) is a matchmaker who Rogelio meets with in order to have a child. The two end up falling for one another, entering into a relationship and starring in a reality show together, but three years pass, and it is revealed they have broken up.

==== Chuck Chesser ====
Chuck Chesser (portrayed by Johnny Messner) is the Fairwick Hotel's newest owner who has a longterm feud with Petra. The two have a no-strings-attached sexual relationship for six months before eventually deciding to be a couple.

==== Fabian Regalo del Cielo ====
Fabian Regalo del Cielo (Francisco San Martin) is Rogelio's telenovela costar who Jane has her first fling with. The relationship becomes complicated when Fabian finds himself wanting more from Jane, but Jane does not reciprocate.

==== Adam Alvaro ====
Adam Alvaro (portrayed by Tyler Posey) is Jane's first love who she almost married after high school. The two get back together after Adam delivers Jane a letter, he found that was addressed to her from her late husband, Michael.

Posey's casting was announced in April 2017. Series lead Gina Rodriguez and the costume designer pitched the idea to showrunner Jennie Snyder Urman, who immediately offered Posey the role. There was a brief moment where they thought they lost Posey to another project.

=== Introduced in season four ===
==== Baby Michaelina De La Vega Factor ====
Baby Michaelina De La Vega Factor (portrayed by uncredited baby actors) is Rogelio and Darci's daughter, conceived during the production of The De La Vega Factor Factor.

==== Jane Ramos ====
Jane "JR" Ramos (portrayed by Rosario Dawson) is Petra's attorney following Anežka's death. Though seemingly a friend to Petra, it turns out she was being blackmailed to help frame Petra for murder, the life of her mother being at stake.

==== River Fields ====
River Fields (portrayed by Brooke Shields) is a beloved American actress and advocate for awareness of postpartum depression, who takes issue after Rogelio speaks on men suffering PPD.

=== Introduced in season five ===
==== Bobby ====
Bobby (portrayed by Tommy Dorfman) is an associate of Sin Rostro, initially sent to Miami to keep an eye on Luisa.

== Minor characters ==
- Billy Cordero (Ryan Devlin, season 1): Michael's shady brother.
- Valeria and Victoria (Vanessa Merrell and Veronica Merrell, seasons 1-2): are Rogelio's former stepdaughters who serve as thorns in Jane's side.
- Liliana De La Vega (Rita Moreno, seasons 1-2, 5): Rogelio's mother who disapproves of Xiomara.
- Andie (Rachel DiPillo): once Jane's friend, she later dates Michael.
- Sister Margaret (Leslie Simms) and Sister Theresa (Willow Geer): nuns who work at the school Jane teaches at.
- Juicy Jordan (Vanessa Vander Pluym): Luisa's girlfriend who breaks up with her for not being over Rose.
- Manuel De La Vega (Cástulo Guerra, season 2): Rogelio's father who comes out as a homosexual.
- Paola/Lola (Ana de la Reguera, season 2): once Rogelio's prison pen pal, she gets out of jail and becomes his assistant before kidnapping him.
- Wesley Masters (Brian Jordan Alvarez): one Jane's classmates who betrays her trust and writes a scandalous piece on the Solanos.
- Pablo Alonso Segura (Marcelo Tubert; season 2): the man Alba lost her virginity to, who is known to be bad luck.
- Chloe Leland (Maya Kazan): a publisher that Jane worked for.
- Eileen (Elisabeth Röhm, seasons 3 and 5): a woman whose identity and face Rose uses in order to be with Luisa in front of her family.
- Abbey Whitman (Minka Kelly; season 3): Rafael's girlfriend of two years who runs a greeting card company. The two move in together, but the relationship falls through when Rafael finds himself unable to fully commit, and also rediscovers his feelings for Petra.
- Alex (Deniz Akdeniz; season 3): Mateo's aide at preschool who Jane later mistakes as being flirty with her rather than just friendly.
- Katherine Cortes (Alex Meneses; season 4): a Miami socialite who Rafael has a fling with during his plan to take back the Marbella.
- Anton/Carl (Graham Sibley, season 4): an actor hired by Anežka and Magda to gaslight Luisa.
- Jeremy Howe (Evan Todd): Jane's bro-ish editor for her first book
- Pammy the Parrot (Katie Michels): the mascott at the Marbella.
- Pond Juniper Fields (Eden Sher) is River's estranged daughter and personal assistant.
- Lily Lofton (Emmy Raver-Lampman) is Jane's book editor who helps her publish her second novel.
