= Jane the Virgin season 3 =

Jane the Virgin
- Season 3
- Jane the Virgin season 3 poster
- Starring: Gina Rodriguez; Andrea Navedo; Yael Grobglas; Justin Baldoni; Ivonne Coll; Brett Dier; Jaime Camil
- No. of episodes: 20

Release
- Original network: The CW
- Original release: October 17, 2016 – May 22, 2017

Season chronology
- ← Previous; Season 2 Next → Season 4

The third season of Jane the Virgin premiered on The CW on October 17, 2016 and ended on May 22, 2017. The season consisted of 20 episodes and stars Gina Rodriguez as Jane Villanueva a young Latina university student accidentally artificially inseminated with her boss' sperm, Rafael Solano (Justin Baldoni). In this season, Jane marries Michael Cordero, Jr. (Brett Dier) and must deal with married life while Rafael discovers secrets from his past and his ex-wife, Petra Solano (Yael Grobglas), deals with her evil twin sister.

== Cast and characters ==
=== Main ===
- Gina Rodriguez as Jane Gloriana Villanueva
- Andrea Navedo as Xiomara "Xo" Gloriana Villanueva
- Yael Grobglas as Petra Solano/Anezka
- Justin Baldoni as Rafael Solano
- Ivonne Coll as Alba Gloriana Villanueva
- Brett Dier as Michael Cordero, Jr.
- Jaime Camil as Rogelio de la Vega

=== Recurring ===
- Mia and Ella Allan as Anna and Elsa Solano
- Yara Martinez as Dr. Luisa Alver
- Bridget Regan as Rose Solano / Sin Rostro
- Diane Guerrero as Lina Santillan
- Priscilla Barnes as Magda Andel
- Justina Machado as Darci Factor
- Ricardo Chavira as Bruce
- Johnny Messner as Chuck Chesser
- Alfonso DiLuca as Jorge
- Francisco San Martín as Fabian Regalo del Cielo
- Joseph Sanders as Mateo Solano Villenuveva

== Episodes ==
No. overall	No. in season	Title	Directed by	Written by	Original release date	U.S. viewers (millions)
45	1	"Chapter Forty-Five"	Gina Lamar	Jennie Snyder Urman	October 17, 2016	1.09
Michael is in critical condition fighting for his life in hospital, as we are given flashbacks to the start of Jane and Michael's romance. Police question Petra (really her twin sister, Anežka) and find her acting suspiciously and Jane and Michael's mom finally learn to get along.
46	2	"Chapter Forty-Six"	Brad Silberling	David S. Rosenthal & Paul Sciarrotta	October 24, 2016	1.10
When Rafael finally admits that he is over Jane, their co-parenting style is tested when they argue over what the best preschool is for Mateo. Xo is paranoid about Alba finding out her secret and what it will do to their relationship. Rogelio is ready to cross over to American TV, especially after he learns his nemesis is making the transition. Meanwhile, Anežka is trying to find new dirt on Rafael when she begins an unexpected romance.
47	3	"Chapter Forty-Seven"	Eva Longoria Baston	Carolina Rivera & Micah Schraft	October 31, 2016	0.97
Jane continues to work on her thesis and she decides to add Alba's estranged sister to the narrative, much to Alba's dismay. In order for Rogelio to have a chance at being an American crossover star he decides to bring the Passions of Santos to The CW in hopes they will pick it up. Xo thinks about abandoning her dream of being a singer for something more realistic. Meanwhile, Luisa is forced to make a choice between her family or Rose. Jane finally loses her virginity to Michael after the newly-weds facing many interruptions, a cartoon rocket ship is shown with Jane and Michael inside blasting off into the sky as a symbol of their lovemaking.
48	4	"Chapter Forty-Eight"	Melanie Mayron	Sarah Goldfinger & Jessica O'Toole & Amy Rardin	November 7, 2016	1.08
Jane and Michael's housewarming party in their new home hits a snag when they discover they are being evicted for not paying their rent. Rogelio is still determined to break into American television, but needs some unusual help from Rafael. Xo makes a new career choice, but Alba and Jane aren't convinced this is the one for her. Meanwhile, "Petra" shocks Rafael with what she wants to do with her shares of the hotel.
49	5	"Chapter Forty-Nine"	Anna Mastro	Paul Sciarrotta	November 14, 2016	0.93
Jane convinces Alba to let her read the letters from her estranged sister, but under the condition Jane does not reach out to her family. Rafael is starting to suspect that something is different with Petra. Meanwhile, Michael and Rafael, with the help of Jane and Rogelio, try to create a civil friendship, but it does not go as smoothly as everyone hoped.
50	6	"Chapter Fifty"	Melanie Mayron	Valentina Garza & David S. Rosenthal	November 21, 2016	1.01
Jane's cousin visits her unexpectedly and causes Jane to reflect on her own life. Meanwhile, Xo finds a spot for her dance studio; Rogelio wrestles with telling Xo how he feels about her; and Petra turns to Rafael when she learns she's being sued.
51	7	"Chapter Fifty-One"	Gina Lamar	Sarah Goldfinger & Jessica O'Toole & Amy Rardin	November 28, 2016	1.15
When Alba makes Jane feel guilty for not attending church, Jane decides she wants to bring Mateo against Rafael's wishes. Rafael unlocks a long lost memory of him and his mother, which could be a clue in the Mutter case. Rogelio hires a matchmaker to help him get over Xo. Meanwhile, Jane's cousin is starting to wear out her welcome.
52	8	"Chapter Fifty-Two"	Anna Mastro	Carolina Rivera & Micah Schraft	January 23, 2017	0.99
Jane still is not approving of Xo and Bruce's relationship, same as Bruce's daughter, Tess. Rafael gets a DNA test and finds out he's not biologically a Solano when he finds an addendum to his father's will that states his estate will be divided between his biological children, leaving him broke. Rafael's lawyer advises him not to say anything so he can keep his money, but revenge-seeking Petra has heard it all on her hidden cameras. Michael is sick of desk duty and quits his job. Catalina is revealed to be married. Rogelio confesses his feelings for Darci in an odd way, she does not reciprocate and tells him to get rid of them if he wants to have a baby with her. Jane tries yoga to help with her stress.
53	9	"Chapter Fifty-Three"	Gina Lamar	Chantelle M. Wells	January 30, 2017	0.91
Michael has decided to become a lawyer, and is now preparing for the LSAT. Jane notices Mateo's friends are speaking full sentences but he's only saying a couple of words, so she takes him to the doctor. Rafael tells Jane he wants to probate the addendum for his father's will. Petra manipulates Catalina to distract Rafael for one more night for $10,000. Jane and Michael share their worries with each other. Petra destroys the addendum for her twins' sake. Catalina goes home. Scott and Anežka get married and put the addendum back together after it was shredded to blackmail Petra into letting Anežka stay in the county. Rogelio and Darci decide to wait on the baby and go on a date. Rogelio finishes making Tiago.
54	10	"Chapter Fifty-Four"	Melanie Mayron	Micah Schraft & Jennie Snyder Urman	February 6, 2017	0.93
Jane gets a new job. Petra struggles to connect with her daughters. Jane thinks she might be pregnant. Rafael tells Luisa they're not biologically related, but she does not care. She introduces him to her new girlfriend and Rafael says he will need blood tests after what happened last time with Rose. It's revealed that Luisa's new girlfriend is Rose and has hired the woman she looks like now to take the tests so she can be with Luisa. Rogelio goes viral. Jane gets her period, and both she and Michael are disappointed but excited about the idea of having kids together. Anežka wants to see the twins, and they're so happy with her but not with Petra. The Villanuevas have dinner with Bruce and Tess and it goes well. Rafael faces jail time for covering up his fathers crimes. Tragedy strikes Jane's family and the story skips ahead 3 years to a wedding.
55	11	"Chapter Fifty-Five"	Brad Silberling	Paul Sciarrotta & Jennie Snyder Urman	February 13, 2017	1.07
As the timeline skips forward 3 years, Rogelio is filming a reality TV show. Xo and Bruce are still together. Mateo is having behavioral problems, unlike Anna and Ellie. Petra has re-opened the new kids-friendly Marbella and has taken to motherhood as she's now the president of the school PTA and her daughters are getting rave reviews from their teachers. She's also sleeping with the adults-only hotel owner from across the street, Chuck. Rafael is out of jail and he and Jane are best friends, he also has a new girlfriend, Abbey, that he's been with for over a year. Jane gets a deal to publish her new novel. A body is found buried in the sand by the Marbella.
56	12	"Chapter Fifty-Six"	Matthew Diamond	Valentina Garza	February 20, 2017	1.06
Jane must deal with the aftermath of Michael's death 4 years in the future with a misbehaving Mateo in and out of school. Rogelio and Darci's reality show has taken off and Xiomara has been cast as an evil ex girlfriend, which affects her life off-screen as fans blame her for ruining Rogelio's relationship in the show. Rafael is out of prison and he and Petra have a grand opening to prepare for as they rebrand the Marbella. However, plans exceed the property line and they must fight with the neighbor for rights to open by opening day.
57	13	"Chapter Fifty-Seven"	Zetna Fuentes	Madeline Hendricks	February 27, 2017	0.88
Jane is unsure about her new agent's suggestions about her work. Rafael is deciding whether he should move in with Abbey and Petra is tortured by her involvement in the aftermath of Scott's murder case.
58	14	"Chapter Fifty-Eight"	Melanie Mayron	Merigan Mulhern	March 20, 2017	0.84
Jane feels guilty that she is not around for Mateo as much as she would like, so she decides to run for Room Mom against none other than perfect mom, Petra. With the help of Jane and Xo, Alba tries to impress her crush, but it does not go as smoothly as planned. Rafael tries to be there for both Jane and Petra. Meanwhile, Rogelio tries to slyly get information from Mateo about Xo and Bruce's (guest star Ricardo Chavira) relationship.
59	15	"Chapter Fifty-Nine"	Anna Mastro	Deidre Shaw	March 27, 2017	0.89
Jane turns to Rafael and Petra for advice on getting back into the dating scene. Meanwhile, Alba takes Jane and Xo's advice on Jorge. Also, Petra becomes worried after she learns Chuck is talking to the police.
60	16	"Chapter Sixty"	Micah Schraft	Carolina Rivera & Micah Schraft	April 24, 2017	0.79
Jane finally becomes a published author, but she's reluctant to talk about her past to help sell her book. Meanwhile, Rogelio is intimidated by his new younger male co-star, Fabian (guest star Francisco San Martin), and begins to wonder if the newbie is trying to upstage him. However, Jane finds herself in the middle of Rogelio and Fabian's personal conflict when she establishes a crush on Fabian. At the same time, Alba continues her own tentative flirtation with her co-worker Jorge. Meanwhile, Luisa and her new girlfriend Eileen (guest star Elisabeth Röhm) are back in town to visit Rafael, but Rafael is not taking any chances when it comes to safety and has their hotel room bugged. Elsewhere, Petra must convince Anežka to come back to Miami to answer some questions the police have for her about Scott's murder.
61	17	"Chapter Sixty-One"	Melanie Mayron	Paul Sciarrotta	May 1, 2017	0.77
Jane is ready for a fling with Fabian but soon realizes they are not on the same page. Alba persuades Jane to give Fabian a chance. Also, Jane bumps into Lina unexpectedly. They had lost touch when Lina moved to New York two years ago. Can their friendship be repaired? Alba discovers Jorge is undocumented. Xo and Rogelio get engaged. Meanwhile, Anežka blackmails Petra into helping prove that she did not kill Scott. Petra turns to Rafael for support. Meanwhile, Rafael is having feelings for Petra and asks Jane for advice. Chuck convinces Petra to chase down a lead on Scott's killer but this leaves Petra in a very precarious situation.
62	18	"Chapter Sixty-Two"	Fernando Sariñana	Jessica O'Toole & Amy Rardin & David S. Rosenthal	May 8, 2017	0.99
Jane has to learn how to handle her new love life, especially when Fabian, the guy she is dating, introduces her to his grandmother. Petra learns some interesting information about Chuck about his involvement with his hotel when he comes clean and denies anything to do with Scott's murder. Xo and Rogelio are eager to share their news with Jane, but want to try to take her feelings into consideration. Meanwhile, when Mateo starts asking questions about where he came from and the topic of sex, Jane and Rafael are forced to sit down with the five-year-old and explain how their family came to be.
63	19	"Chapter Sixty-Three"	Gina Lamar	Paul Sciarrotta	May 15, 2017	0.76
Jane and Fabian are not on the same page when it comes to their relationship, which makes it hard for Jane to ask him for a favor. Meanwhile, Petra and Rafael both turn to Jane for advice, but Jane is determined not to get involved in their drama again. Also, Jane volunteers to help Xo and Rogelio with getting back together, but she might have bitten off more than she can chew. Elsewhere, Rafael sinks to a new low when he agrees to cooperate with the police in a charade to lure Luisa back to the hotel so they can arrest her and Eileen whom they now suspect to be Scott's killer.
64	20	"Chapter Sixty-Four"	Melanie Mayron	Micah Schraft & Jennie Snyder Urman	May 22, 2017	0.96
As a lingering tropical storm threatens to shut down the city of Miami, the ordained Jane struggles to find the right words for Rogelio and Xo's wedding ceremony, when she learns about a mysterious letter that Michael wrote before their wedding and sets out to find it. Rogelio and Xo are excited for their big day, but Rogelio gets some shocking news that could put things on hold when Darci shows up, now seven months pregnant. With Rose finally captured and in jail, Luisa tries to secure her own release to cooperate with the police to Rose's business. Here, the identity of Scott's killer is finally revealed to be the real Eileen. Once again, Rafael is upset with Luisa for getting involved with Rose, while she is angry and upset that Rafael lied to her about his cancer returning for the purpose to lure her and Rose back to Miami. Rafael tells Luisa to leave the hotel and get out of his life for good, but this pushes the scorned and mentally unbalanced Luisa over the edge and, after a chance meeting with Anežka, she plots a wicked and vindictive plan to get back at Rafael, while Anežka plots her own wicked plan of revenge against Petra. Elsewhere, Petra is skeptical about Jane's feelings for Rafael which leads her to make a rash decision that leads her to facing the barrel of a gun held by Anežka.

== Ratings ==
Viewership and ratings per episode of Jane the Virgin season 3
No.	Title	Air date	Rating/share (18–49)	Viewers (millions)	DVR (18–49)	DVR viewers (millions)	Total (18–49)	Total viewers (millions)
1	"Chapter Forty-Five"	October 17, 2016	0.4/2	1.09	0.4	0.83	0.8	1.92
2	"Chapter Forty-Six"	October 24, 2016	0.4/2	1.10	0.4	0.77	0.8	1.88
3	"Chapter Forty-Seven"	October 31, 2016	0.4/1	0.97	0.4	0.88	0.8	1.85
4	"Chapter Forty-Eight"	November 7, 2016	0.4/2	1.08	0.4	0.72	0.8	1.80
5	"Chapter Forty-Nine"	November 14, 2016	0.3/1	0.93	0.4	—N/a	0.7	—N/a
6	"Chapter Fifty"	November 21, 2016	0.4/2	1.01	0.3	0.76	0.7	1.79
7	"Chapter Fifty-One"	November 28, 2016	0.4/2	1.15	0.4	0.70	0.8	1.85
8	"Chapter Fifty-Two"	January 23, 2017	0.4/1	0.99	0.3	0.72	0.7	1.70
9	"Chapter Fifty-Three"	January 30, 2017	0.3/1	0.91	0.3	0.68	0.6	1.59
10	"Chapter Fifty-Four"	February 6, 2017	0.3/1	0.93	0.4	0.76	0.7	1.69
11	"Chapter Fifty-Five"	February 13, 2017	0.4/2	1.07	0.3	0.64	0.7	1.71
12	"Chapter Fifty-Six"	February 20, 2017	0.4/1	1.06	0.3	0.61	0.7	1.67
13	"Chapter Fifty-Seven"	February 27, 2017	0.3/1	0.88	—N/a	—N/a	—N/a	—N/a
14	"Chapter Fifty-Eight"	March 20, 2017	0.3/1	0.84	0.4	0.71	0.7	1.55
15	"Chapter Fifty-Nine"	March 27, 2017	0.3/1	0.89	0.4	0.69	0.7	1.57
16	"Chapter Sixty"	April 24, 2017	0.2/1	0.79	TBD	TBD	TBD	TBD
17	"Chapter Sixty-One"	May 1, 2017	0.2/1	0.77	0.3	0.55	0.5	1.32
18	"Chapter Sixty-Two"	May 8, 2017	0.4/1	0.99	TBD	TBD	TBD	TBD
19	"Chapter Sixty-Three"	May 15, 2017	0.2/1	0.76	0.3	0.58	0.5	1.34
20	"Chapter Sixty-Four"	May 22, 2017	0.3/1	0.96	0.3	0.60	0.6	1.56
