= Jane the Virgin season 4 =

Jane the Virgin
- Season 4
- Jane the Virgin season 4 poster
- Starring: Gina Rodriguez; Andrea Navedo; Yael Grobglas; Justin Baldoni; Ivonne Coll; Elias Janssen; Jaime Camil
- No. of episodes: 17

Release
- Original network: The CW
- Original release: October 13, 2017 – April 20, 2018

Season chronology
- ← Previous; Season 3 Next → Season 5

The fourth season of Jane the Virgin originally aired in the United States on The CW from October 13, 2017, through April 20, 2018. The season was produced by CBS Television Studios, with Jennie Snyder Urman serving as showrunner. The series was renewed for a fourth season on January 8, 2017.

Season four stars Gina Rodriguez as Jane Villanueva, Andrea Navedo as Jane's mother Xiomara De La Vega, Ivonne Coll as Jane's grandmother Alba Villanueva, and Jaime Camil as Jane's father Rogelio De La Vega, with Justin Baldoni as Jane's lover and babydaddy Rafael Solano, and Yael Grobglas as Rafael's ex-wife and other babymama Petra Solano. Elias Janssen is added as a series regular, portraying a recast version of Jane's son Mateo Solano Villanueva.

== Production ==
On January 8, 2017, The CW renewed the series for a fourth season. It was later announced on May 18, 2017, that the series had been moved from its Monday night time-slot to a Friday night time-slot, being paired alongside the third season of Crazy Ex-Girlfriend, premiering on October 13, 2017. The last seven episodes of the season were paired alongside Dynasty, which was moved from Wednesday night to Friday night in the middle of the broadcast season. The season also received a reduced episode account, per request of showrunner Jennie Snyder Urman, bringing the season's episode count to a total of 17, making it the shortest season of the series in total.

When the promotional poster for the season was first released, it was revealed that the character of Mateo was recast with Elias Janssen due to previous child actor Joseph Sanders being too busy with school to commit to the role. As of the first episode of the season, Janssen was credited with "starring" billing along with the six other series regulars. On September 20, 2017, it was announced that Alex Meneses was set to recur as Katherine, "owner of the Cortes Hotel Conglomerate, who is a possible investor of Rafael (Justin Baldoni) and Petra's (Yael Grobglas) hotel". On January 7, 2018, it was announced that Rosario Dawson joined the cast for a multi-episode role in the back-half of the season, though the details of her role remained kept under wraps until the character's introduction scene was released a day before her debut episode was set to air, revealing that Dawson would be playing Jane Ramos, an attorney hired to defend Petra. The back-half of the season also saw Brooke Shields in a multi-episode arc as River Fields, Rogelio's (Jaime Camil) nemesis and a spoof of the real-life actress.

On January 9, 2018, series star Gina Rodriguez announced via Instagram that she would be making her directorial debut this season, posting a photo of herself holding a Jane the Virgin clapperboard with her name next to the director slot, alongside costars Yael Grobglas and Rosario Dawson. Rodriguez's directorial debut was the tenth episode of the season, "Chapter Seventy-Four", which aired on February 9, 2018. The episode was specially selected by showrunner Jennie Snyder-Urman as it featured the characters of Jane (Gina Rodriguez) and Rafael (Justin Baldoni) having sex for the first time. "She said that it would be really great for me to be able to direct something that is so intimate and could be very uncomfortable. It could be very scary to not only shoot, but also to be in that environment...So there were a lot of layers of challenge and then it ended up being so beautiful," Rodriguez recalls of her directing experience. Costar Justin Baldoni also directs this season, taking on the fourteenth episode, "Chapter Seventy-Eight".

== Cast and characters ==
=== Main ===
- Gina Rodriguez as Jane Villanueva
- Andrea Navedo as Xiomara De La Vega
- Yael Grobglas as Petra Solano/Anezka Archuletta
- Justin Baldoni as Rafael Solano
- Ivonne Coll as Alba Villanueva
- Elias Janssen as Mateo Solano Villanueva
- Jaime Camil as Rogelio De La Vega

=== Recurring ===
- Mia and Ella Allan as Anna and Elsa Solano
- Rosario Dawson as Jane Ramos
- Priscilla Barnes as Magda Andel
- Shelly Bhalla as Krishna Dhawan
- Justina Machado as Darci Factor
- Keller Wortham as Esteban Santiago
- Alfonso DiLuca as Jorge Garcia
- Yara Martinez as Luisa Alver
- Tyler Posey as Adam Alvaro
- Bridget Regan as Rose Solano
- Brooke Shields as River Fields
- Alex Meneses as Katherine Cortes
- Graham Sibley as Anton/Carl
- Francisco San Martín as Fabian Regalo del Cielo

=== Guest ===
- Johnny Messner as Chuck Chesser
- Diane Guerrero as Lina Santillan
- Isabel Allende as herself
- Molly Hagan as Patricia Cordero
- Iyanla Vanzant as herself
- Julie Chen as herself
- Eve as herself
- Sara Gilbert as herself
- Sharon Osbourne as herself
- Sheryl Underwood as herself
- Eva Longoria as herself
- Melanie Mayron as Marlene Donaldson
- Adam Rodriguez as Jonathan Chavez
- Brian Dare as Luca
- Alano Miller as Roman Zazo
- Mario Lopez as himself
- Amy Brenneman as Donna
- Brett Dier as Michael Cordero, Jr.

== Episodes ==
No. overall	No. in season	Title	Directed by	Written by	Original release date	U.S. viewers (millions)
65	1	"Chapter Sixty-Five"	Brad Silberling	Jennie Snyder Urman & Paul Sciarrotta	October 13, 2017	0.68
Jane reunites with her first love, Adam, much to the dismay of Xiomara and Alba. After losing ownership of the Marbella, Rafael moves in with the Villanuevas. After a romantic misunderstanding with him, Jane decides to pursue Adam. Petra survives being held at gunpoint by Anezka, shoving her into the sea where she's swept up by the current and left for dead. When Petra returns to the Marbella, Luisa believes her to be Anezka, which Petra tries to use to her advantage. Petra and Rafael reconcile, and Petra's plans hit a snag when Anezka turns up alive. Xiomara and Rogelio struggle to enjoy life as newlyweds as Darci schemes about how to get custody of her and Rogelio's unborn child. Rose is visited in prison by a mysterious man who meets an unfortunate fate.
66	2	"Chapter Sixty-Six"	Gina Lamar	Valentina Garza & Jessica O'Toole & Amy Rardin	October 20, 2017	0.61
Jane's relationship with Adam helps remind her that she's more than just a mom, with painful consequences. Adam receives an out of state job opportunity, but ultimately decides to stay in Miami for the sake of his relationship with Jane. Rogelio continues to face issues with Fabian at work, and the network executives decide to shake up the telenovela by killing one of their characters off. Rogelio goes to great lengths to ensure the security of his job. Though his attempt is successful, he soon realizes that Fabian has been replaced by Esteban Santiago, his arch nemesis. Xiomara helps take care of Darci and proves just how devoted Rogelio is to being a father. Darci and Esteban meet and sparks fly. Petra and Rafael plot ways to buy back the hotel from Luisa. Finding that Rafael does not trust her, Petra ultimately ends their relationship, and Rafael goes to bed with Katherine. Petra finds that she has bigger problems than her failed relationship when it's revealed that Magda has been released from prison.
67	3	"Chapter Sixty-Seven"	Fernando Sariñana	Carolina Rivera & Micah Schraft	October 27, 2017	0.60
As Jane and Adam's relationship progresses, Jane decides that it's time for him to meet Mateo. Jane and Adam have a misunderstanding about the cover art for her book. Darci is due to give birth any day, and Rogelio is jealous of Esteban's increasing role in his unborn child's life. Rafael continues sleeping with Katherine in order to coax her into investing in the Marbella, but when it becomes clear that she's looking for more than just a sexual relationship, Rafael devises a plan to convince Katherine he's serious about her. Petra deals with both Anezka and Magda inhabiting the Marbella, as they've aligned themselves with Luisa, who is becoming more desperate to get the money needed to initiate Rose's escape protocol from jail. In the end, Luisa is approached by a mysterious man named Carl, who wants to burn the Marbella down so that they can collect the insurance money.
68	4	"Chapter Sixty-Eight"	Gina Lamar	Deirdre Shaw & Chantelle M. Wells	November 3, 2017	0.69
Jane is upset when she finds out that Rafael introduced Mateo to Katherine behind her back, and she comes to believe that Katherine is a bad influence on both Rafael and Mateo. Petra sides with Rafael and wants him to stick out the relationship with Katherine until the deal is finalized. Jane tries to talk Rafael out of signing the deal, leading to a disagreement. Jane and Adam agree to take a week apart, and she is turned off by a comment Adam makes about Mateo. Meanwhile, Xiomara goes into business with her high school rival 'Slutty' Crystal in an attempt to save her failing dance studio. Rogelio and Darci struggle to find a name for their new baby. Luisa continues to conspire with Carl to burn down the Marbella, but after Anezka supposedly meets him, a discussion between her and Magda indicates that Carl is just a figment of Luisa's imagination. Rafael decides to do the right thing and break up with Katherine, with dramatic consequences.
69	5	"Chapter Sixty-Nine"	Stuart Gillard	Paul Sciarrotta	November 10, 2017	0.65
Jane learns through a visit with Lina and her fiancé Danny that Adam is bisexual, something she struggles to come to terms with. Lina is unsure whether or not she should marry Danny, while Jane helps plan an engagement party. Xiomara asks Rogelio to get a vasectomy, but he's hesitant. Petra thinks that Luisa is hallucinating Carl, and Rafael recalls Luisa once hallucinated a woman named "Carla". He confronts Luisa, who, thinking she's having a psychotic break, makes amends with Rafael and signs over the hotel shares before checking herself into a psychiatric institution. In the end, however, it's revealed that the shares would actually go over to Anezka, and Carl is revealed to be an actor hired by Magda and Anezka.
70	6	"Chapter Seventy"	Melanie Mayron	Carolina Rivera & Micah Schraft	November 17, 2017	0.61
Jane's book launch party plans hit a snag when she finds out the sentimental venue is in danger of closing for good. Rogelio devises a plan to save the day, but his ex-costar and Jane's ex-lover Fabian threatens to ruin things unless Rogelio allows him a dignified farewell scene in their telenovela, which he wants Jane to write. While the party turns out a smashing success, neither Rafael or Adam can attend. Adam breaks up with Jane in order to take a job opportunity in California. Rogelio reveals a harsh truth to Xiomara about her pregnancy with Jane. Meanwhile, Petra finds out that Carl is a real person and manipulates Anezka into thinking Magda is working against her. Overwhelmed and unsure of whom to trust, Anezka hangs herself.
71	7	"Chapter Seventy-One"	Micah Schraft	Valentina Garza & Deidre Shaw	December 8, 2017	0.65
Jane sets off on her book tour with Xiomara and Alba, both of whom are running away from problems in Miami. Jane is hit hard by a bad book review, but a visit from a tough character renews her confidence. While the Villanueva women are out of town, Rafael and Rogelio are left to take care of Mateo, who develops a fever. Petra holds a funeral for Anezka, but soon finds out that she faked her death. Once again needing Anezka on her side, she proves to her twin just how little Magda cares about her "death". Magda is kicked out of the Marbella, and Anezka continues to investigate where her family's loyalties lie. Anezka confronts Petra, leading to a fall from the balcony. Once the Villanueva women are home, Alba meets with Jorge and asks him to propose to her again. Xiomara tells Rogelio that she would like to do couple's counselling, to his dismay, and Jane and Rafael have a conversation that ends romantically.
72	8	"Chapter Seventy-Two"	Melanie Mayron	Carolina Rivera & Paul Sciarrotta	January 26, 2018	0.68
Mateo starts kindergarten in Xiomara and Rogelio's zip code. Jane and Rafael's deception is put to the test when Mateo invites a friend over. Jane and Rafael have mixed emotions following their kiss and decide to try again. Xo convinces Rogelio to attend couple's therapy, and they're both surprised by their emotions. Petra hires a lawyer named Jane Ramos (Rosario Dawson), to ensure she is not charged with Anezka's death. Rafael decides to move out of Jane's house and rent his own apartment. Rafael and Petra have a heated conversation when Rafael discovers Luisa has left the psychiatric ward and Petra knew Carl was not a hallucination.
73	9	"Chapter Seventy-Three"	Eric Lea	Valentina Garza & Chantelle M. Wells	February 2, 2018	0.67
When Jane and Rafael realize that the uncertain state of their relationship is stressing Mateo out, they come to a decision. Petra is on the outs with Jane and Rafael after the Luisa fiasco, so she tries to figure out a way to get back into their good graces. It's revealed that Petra's lawyer Jane Ramos ("J.R.") has a hidden agenda in helping Petra. Elsewhere, Rogelio and Xo are both contemplating their career choices.
74	10	"Chapter Seventy-Four"	Gina Rodriguez	Micah Schraft & Paul Sciarrotta	February 9, 2018	0.80
Jane and Rafael act as friends as they rekindle their relationship in secret, but frictions arise between the two of them when Jane is forced to accept to go on a date set up for her by Alba. Petra and Jane's new professional partnership is off to a rocky start. Rogelio is convinced he has male postpartum depression, which puts him at odds with celebrity River Fields (Brooke Shields) and results in a televised debate. Alba finally confides in Jane about why she turned down the marriage proposal from Jorge, resulting in an interesting inter-generational shopping trip to an adult toy store. Alba initially feels resistant about her purchase but later on it helps her feel more confident about her body. Jane and Rafael settle their issues and make love for the first time in the shower. Petra questions her sexual identity when she starts to dream about J.R.
75	11	"Chapter Seventy-Five"	Gina Lamar	Merigan Mulhern	March 2, 2018	0.59
Jane is ready to move on from the Marbella and pursue writing full time, but an unexpected development forces her to consider returning to her teaching roots. Xiomara thinks about going back to school while Jane teaches a seminar about writing. Jane notices that Jonathan Chavez, her former advisor and romantic interest, is taking advantage of another student of his. Jane's attempt to warn the student backfires spectacularly. Meanwhile, Petra gets arrested for Anezka's murder due to planted evidence, leading J.R. to tell Petra the truth about why she's representing her. Rafael and Jane continue their relationship, which is growing stronger, until they decide to tell their family they are back together. Rogelio tries to get Eva Longoria to join his Passions of Santos reboot and finds out the two are distant cousins.
76	12	"Chapter Seventy-Six"	Melanie Mayron	Leah Longoria	March 9, 2018	0.58
Jane and Rafael start spreading the news about them having got back together. Jane's fixation on a negative review has left her with writer's block, so Rogelio suggests she take an improv class to help. With Jane's encouragement, Rafael is ready to dig into his past to find out who his real biological parents are. Meanwhile, Rogelio is trying to make things less about him and more about Xo, but he grows suspicious when he learns she is keeping a secret from him. Petra tests the loyalty of J.R. by "pretending" to be romantically interested in her, and soon confesses her true feelings.
77	13	"Chapter Seventy-Seven"	Gina Lamar	Deirdre Shaw & Chantelle M. Wells	March 16, 2018	0.59
Xiomara faces a frightening diagnosis after a dance competition mishap. Rogelio finally convinces River Fields to meet with him and learns that she has a plan in mind. Rafael is determined to find Luisa, who is missing and may have information on his biological mother. Rose attempts to blackmail Rafael into revealing Luisa's location. Jane and Petra have a falling out over the Tooth Fairy. After a shocking visit to her ailing mother, J.R. tells Petra how she feels about pursuing their relationship. The identity of J.R.'s blackmailer is revealed.
78	14	"Chapter Seventy-Eight"	Justin Baldoni	Valentina Garza & Micah Schraft	March 23, 2018	0.65
Xo struggles to make an important health decision and looks to Jane for guidance, leaving Rogelio feeling like an outsider. Alba is frustrated with Rogelio when it seems he is prioritizing his career over Xo. After a hilarious misunderstanding, Petra turns to Rafael for advice on her love life.
79	15	"Chapter Seventy-Nine"	Gina Lamar	Paul Sciarrotta	April 6, 2018	0.54
J.R., Petra, Jane and Rafael go on a double date, and Jane is troubled by J.R.'s impression of her. Jane and Rafael brush off a big relationship moment and try to remedy the situation, but an unexpected turn arises a lingering issue. Rogelio is nervous to tell Darci that he is no longer able to be a "danny" to Baby, so he uses Xo's cancer as a scapegoat, landing him in hot water with both Xo and Darci. Jane helps Alba prepare to take the biggest test of her life: a written exam to become a US citizen. After talking things out with Rafael, Jane realizes she is ready to take their relationship to the next level and asks him to move in together, which he happily accepts.
80	16	"Chapter Eighty"	Micah Schraft	Micah Schraft	April 13, 2018	0.57
Jane and Rafael start saving to rent a one-bedroom apartment, but their plan falls apart when Mateo breaks an antique $4,000 clock. Rafael moves into the Villanueva house, but a difference in parenting styles leads to a heated argument between him and Alba. Xiomara starts chemotherapy and makes a friend named Donna (guest star Amy Brenneman). The timeline moves forward, and Xo suffers a loss and failing health as chemo takes its toll. River and Rogelio continue arguing over the American Passions of Santos adaptation. After Alba breaks down to Jane, she and Rafael settle their issues. Xiomara bonds with River while watching a telenovela, and River has a breakthrough about The Passions of Steve and Brenda. Jane Ramos gets herself disbarred, and as a result Petra's case is thrown out. In order to overcome the setback they went through in their plan of moving in together and allow Jane to focus on her writing, Rafael decides to accept a real estate permanent job so he can secure them a stable income.
81	17	"Chapter Eighty-One"	Gina Lamar	Jennie Snyder Urman & Paul Sciarrotta	April 20, 2018	0.58
In the fourth season finale, Rafael intends to propose to Jane, but some news from Rose unsettles him. Alba finally becomes a naturalized American citizen and the Villanuevas throw her a surprise party. River spends the week with Rogelio in order to help them be believable as a married couple, but starts to take her role too seriously. Jane Ramos and Petra plan to move in together as a couple, until a piece of information about Anezka surfaces. A call from Krishna urges J.R. back to Petra's apartment just in time to save her life. Rafael reveals the reason for his behaviour to Jane in a shocking twist.

== Reception ==
=== Ratings ===
Viewership and ratings per episode of Jane the Virgin season 4
No.	Title	Air date	Rating/share (18–49)	Viewers (millions)	DVR (18–49)	DVR viewers (millions)	Total (18–49)	Total viewers (millions)
1	"Chapter Sixty-Five"	October 13, 2017	0.3/1	0.68	0.3	0.67	0.6	1.35
2	"Chapter Sixty-Six"	October 20, 2017	0.2/1	0.61	0.3	0.58	0.5	1.19
3	"Chapter Sixty-Seven"	October 27, 2017	0.3/1	0.60	—N/a	0.54	—N/a	1.16
4	"Chapter Sixty-Eight"	November 3, 2017	0.2/1	0.69	0.3	0.55	0.5	1.24
5	"Chapter Sixty-Nine"	November 10, 2017	0.3/1	0.65	—N/a	0.61	—N/a	1.26
6	"Chapter Seventy"	November 17, 2017	0.2/1	0.61	0.3	0.55	0.5	1.16
7	"Chapter Seventy-One"	December 8, 2017	0.3/1	0.65	0.3	0.61	0.6	1.25
8	"Chapter Seventy-Two"	January 26, 2018	0.2/1	0.68	0.4	0.71	0.6	1.39
9	"Chapter Seventy-Three"	February 2, 2018	0.3/1	0.67	0.3	0.60	0.6	1.27
10	"Chapter Seventy-Four"	February 9, 2018	0.3/1	0.80	0.3	0.59	0.6	1.39
11	"Chapter Seventy-Five"	March 2, 2018	0.2/1	0.59	0.3	0.62	0.5	1.21
12	"Chapter Seventy-Six"	March 9, 2018	0.2/1	0.58	0.3	0.53	0.5	1.12
13	"Chapter Seventy-Seven"	March 16, 2018	0.2/1	0.59	0.3	0.59	0.5	1.19
14	"Chapter Seventy-Eight"	March 23, 2018	0.2/1	0.65	0.3	—N/a	0.5	—N/a
15	"Chapter Seventy-Nine"	April 6, 2018	0.2/1	0.54	0.3	0.59	0.5	1.13
16	"Chapter Eighty"	April 13, 2018	0.2/1	0.57	0.2	0.48	0.4	1.10
17	"Chapter Eighty-One"	April 20, 2018	0.2/1	0.58	0.3	0.61	0.5	1.20

=== Critical response ===
The fourth season was received well by critics, notable praise being geared towards its storylines involving topics such as sexuality, immigration, and cancer, as well as its jaw-dropping season finale cliffhanger. Critics also praised the performances of series stars, Andrea Navedo and Yael Grobglas, as well as recurring guest stars, Tyler Posey and Rosario Dawson.

Critics first praised the fifth episode of the season in which Jane's (Gina Rodriguez) boyfriend Adam (Tyler Posey) was revealed to be bisexual. "Fortunately, Jane The Virgin handles Adam's storyline sans ignorant jokes, unchecked offensive comments, and "funny" hysteria, even if Jane's initial response displayed her own misunderstanding of the sexual orientation. It's worth noting too that no one else aside from Jane — from Xiomara to Lina to Danny — batted an eye upon hearing about Adam's sexuality. This kind of bisexual representation can help make the world a safer space for everyone, which means that this episode of Jane The Virgin is definitely one to celebrate," Alexis Reliford, a critic for Bustle said of the story, also mentioning that the show uses Jane's initial discomfort as a way to have a meaningful conversation regarding the topic of bisexuality, debunking some common misconceptions and stereotypes. As noted by Alanna Bennett of Buzzfeed News, it later becomes apparent that this one-off story was just setting some representational ground work for an even bigger storyline in the back-half of the season, featuring Petra (Yael Grobglas) developing feelings for her female lawyer, Jane Ramos (Rosario Dawson). Bennett comments on the idea of pairing Petra up with Dawson's "Jane" being a nod to the portion of the fanbase who rooted for Petra to get together with Rodriguez's "Jane". She notes that, despite only being five episodes into their storyline, "J.R. and Petra’s relationship is already electric — and confirmed to be romantic. Fanfiction empires have been built from a lot less. In a TV landscape that seems to be making way for more and more bi characters, it’s worth paying attention to what Jane the Virgin is doing here with Petra. It's not a whole new character — it's the same Petra audiences have been responding to for the past four years. But there is a shift happening in her, an enticing self-discovery. She's opening up."

TVLine awarded Andrea Navedo as "Performer of the Week" for her role in the fourteenth episode of the season, "Chapter Seventy-Eight", praising the actress for her portrayal of Xiomara post-discovery that she has breast cancer and left with the decision of whether or not to have a double mastectomy. "Navedo brought newfound vulnerability to the role. Normally tall and proud, the actress became thoughtfully muted and somehow seemed smaller, the fear and uncertainty weighing down Xo's vibrant personality. Even a mother-daughter spa day proved little distraction as Xo's eyes filled with anxiety at the thought of losing both her breasts." The storyline involving Xiomara's cancer as well as Navedo's performance of the character received additional praise in the sixteenth episode of the season, "Chapter Eighty". Critics acknowledge the show's ability to balance out Xiomara's cancer arc with some of the more lighthearted storylines. "I don't want to say, "Okay, but any show could do a good cancer story". That's absolutely not true! But while everything about Xo's current story is effective and important, I think the most impressive thing has been watching the show figure out how to tell Xo's story while also maintaining the balance of humor and drama and sweetness that keeps the show itself."
