= Jane the Virgin season 5 =

Jane the Virgin
- Season 5
- Jane the Virgin season 5 poster
- Starring: Gina Rodriguez; Andrea Navedo; Yael Grobglas; Justin Baldoni; Ivonne Coll; Elias Janssen; Brett Dier; Jaime Camil
- No. of episodes: 19

Release
- Original network: The CW
- Original release: March 27 – July 31, 2019

Season chronology
- ← Previous; Season 4

The fifth and final season of Jane the Virgin debuted in the United States on The CW on March 27, 2019. The season was produced by CBS Television Studios, with Jennie Snyder Urman serving as showrunner. Jane the Virgin was renewed for a fifth and final season on April 2, 2018.

Season five stars Gina Rodriguez as Jane Villanueva, Andrea Navedo as Jane's mother Xiomara De La Vega, Ivonne Coll as Jane's grandmother Alba Villanueva, and Jaime Camil as Jane's father Rogelio De La Vega, with Justin Baldoni as Jane's lover and baby daddy Rafael Solano, Brett Dier as Jane's supposedly dead husband Michael Cordero, Yael Grobglas as Rafael's ex-wife and other baby mama Petra Solano, and Elias Janssen as Jane's son Mateo Solano Villanueva.

== Cast and characters ==
=== Main ===
- Gina Rodriguez as Jane Villanueva
- Andrea Navedo as Xiomara De La Vega
- Yael Grobglas as Petra Solano
- Justin Baldoni as Rafael Solano
- Ivonne Coll as Alba Villanueva
- Elias Janssen as Mateo Solano Villanueva
- Brett Dier as Michael Cordero/Jason (Note: Only credited for the episodes he appears in.)
- Jaime Camil as Rogelio De La Vega

=== Recurring ===
- Brooke Shields as River Fields
- Rosario Dawson as Jane Ramos (Note: Also credited in the also starring bill in "Chapter One Hundred".)
- Yara Martinez as Luisa Alver
- Bridget Regan as Rose Solano
- Mia and Ella Allan as Anna and Ellie Solano
- Alfonso DiLuca as Jorge Garcia
- Christopher Allen as Dennis Chambers
- Tommy Dorfman as Bobby
- Shelly Bhalla as Krishna Dhawan
- Priscilla Barnes as Magda Andel
- Justina Machado as Darci Factor
- Keller Wortham as Esteban Santiago

=== Guest ===
- Max Bird-Ridnell as Milos Dvoracek
- Molly Hagan as Patricia Cordero
- Melanie Mayron as Marlene Donaldson
- Haley Lu Richardson as Charlie
- Eden Sher as PJ Fields
- Sophia Bush as Julie Larson
- Diane Guerrero as Lina Santillan
- Ludo Lefebvre as himself
- Rita Moreno as Liliana De La Vega

== Episodes ==
No. overall	No. in season	Title	Directed by	Written by	Original release date	U.S. viewers (millions)
82	1	"Chapter Eighty-Two"	Gina Rodriguez	Jennie Snyder Urman	March 27, 2019	0.79
Jane struggles to cope with the fact that Michael, who now goes by the name of Jason and suffers from amnesia, has returned from the dead. Petra tries to be a better person for the sake of her relationship with JR. Jane and Michael relive their past trying to trigger his memory, only making it harder for Jane as she feels like she was erased from his life. Jane agrees to move in with Rafael because of his unselfishness. Luisa tells Rafael that she will meet Rose to find out why she kidnapped and tormented Michael. Rose is seen in prison speaking to other inmates about their next step.
83	2	"Chapter Eighty-Three"	Gina Lamar	Chantelle M. Wells & Katie Wech	April 3, 2019	0.61
Jane tries to find out if she is still married to Michael/Jason and suffers from severe catholic guilt. Jane tries her best to help Jason regain his memory but is not getting through to him. After Jane learns that she is still married to Michael, she decides to get divorced from him so she can move on with Rafael. Luisa visits Rose in jail learning the reason she faked Michael's death and gave him amnesia. Rogelio has a hard time leaving Xo alone while he is filming the American version of his telenovela. Bobby visits Luisa at her new condo and she blindly invites him in. Jason is lying to Jane regarding the divorce papers.
84	3	"Chapter Eighty-Four"	Brad Silberling	Valentina L. Garza & Deidre Shaw	April 10, 2019	0.61
Jane admits to Rafael that Jason will only sign the divorce papers if he can take her out on a fishing date. Mateo and the twin girls clash, confronting Petra and Jane with their own differences. Things get ugly on set when Rogelio discovers that River Fields is earning twice as much. When Mateo spots Jason at the Marbella, Jane and Rafael are forced to make up a passable explanation. Petra admits that she feels left out by Jane; the two make amends and exchange advice on each other's love lives. Jason shows up at Jane's after their date and agrees to move back to Montana. When he takes his leave, the top of his fishing rod strikes the porch ceiling. As white debris rains down, Jason remembers Michael's first kiss with Jane "under the snow," which further triggers his memory of their entire life together.
85	4	"Chapter Eighty-Five"	Melanie Mayron	Carolina Rivera & Liz Sczudlo	April 17, 2019	0.69
Jane is happy that life is back to normal, until she learns that Michael has finally retrieved his memory. Petra's mother, Magda, returns and starts working as a pirate fortune teller at the Marbella. Xo is having her last chemo session and insists on going to grandparents day at Mateo's school and dancing with him, as she wants him to remember her for the person she used to be.afterwards she collapses. Michael and Jane connect while catching up on the last four years of their lives, leaving Jane confused regarding the divorce. Petra asks Jane's advice on sending a text to JR. The two get drunk and Petra sends the text and Jane posts the divorce papers. Petra and JR meet and patch things up. Jane regrets posting the divorce papers. Jorge breaks Alba's heart when she learns that he is not in love with her. Rafael tells Jane to leave when he hears about the divorce papers as he can not bear waiting for her to choose Michael all over again.
86	5	"Chapter Eighty-Six"	Gina Lamar	Joni Lefkowitz & Madeline Hendricks	April 24, 2019	0.58
Jane is heartbroken after Rafael told her to leave, and the fact that Mateo hates her is not helping. Michael comes round to tell Jane his life insurance policy wants their $40 000 back, so he needs Jane to find documentation proving that she genuinely thought he was dead and he was not faking it for the money. Rogelio is upset that Baby is more attached to Esteban than him, so after finding out Esteban's last telenovela bombed meaning he is home all the time! To gets Esteban a job in Mexico. Unfortunately this leads to Esteban breaking up with Darci (but Ro eventually fixes this). Jane cannot face going to her 30th birthday party, so runs away and gets stuck in a ditch trying to write. Alba and Xo go after her, followed by Petra who needs Jane to corroborate her alibi for why she could not have sent an e-mail to Milos (JR is worried because she lied before). Raf agrees with Jane that he had been undermining her in front of Mateo. Jane admits that she still has feelings for Michael and that it is not fair to ask Raf to stick around whilst she figures it out. She also makes up with Mateo.
87	6	"Chapter Eighty-Seven"	Eric Lea	Rafael Agustín	May 1, 2019	0.59
Jane struggles to give Rafael some needed space especially after the kids report seeing daddy taking 'drugs'. Jane tells Petra who says she will deal with it. Petra tries to make a good impression on JR's friends, going to a gay bar with them - but she is socially inept and lacks lesbian cultural references. Then Jane turns up and Petra gets her to join in with a dance competition and as she lightens up and has fun JR's friends warm to her, except her bestie. When Petra challenges her she says she knows Petra broke JR's heart and she doesn't want to see it happen again. Michael and Jane re-trace his steps on the day he was shot and he remembers seeing something on Rose/Elaine's phone which might be why Rose gave him amnesia, not because he saw her Elaine-mask slip as she claimed. Xo wants to resume her sex life but doesn't feel turned on. Her doctor explains she may be having an early menopause due to her chemo. Ro is very supportive and just happy she is alive. Alba's feelings for Jorge grow stronger and she tells Xo about the possibilities for sex as an older person mentioning vibrators and lubricant to Xo's embarrassment! Xo tries masturbation and asks Ro to join her but sadly realises she still doesn't feel right. Alba tells Jorge that she loves him but realises he does not love her therefore they should go their separate ways after he receives his green card. Michael invites Jane to Montana and surprisingly she agrees to go.
88	7	"Chapter Eighty-Eight"	Stuart Gillard	Deirdre Shaw	May 8, 2019	0.71
Jane travels to Montana with Michael, feeling guilty about Rafael. Feeling unsure about Michael, Jane has an on and off time with him. Jane and Michael struggle to be honest with each other. Jane has a clear thought and finally realizes that what she's feeling for Rafael is not guilt but love. After telling Michael that she loves Rafael and chooses to be with him she returns to Miami and tells Rafael how she feels. After Rafael tells Jane that it's too late for their relationship, Jane is more determined to fight for the man she loves.
89	8	"Chapter Eighty-Nine"	Zetna Fuentes	Katie Wech & Valentina L. Garza	May 15, 2019	0.62
Jane is unable to back off and give Rafael space – he starts avoiding her so she resorts to stalking him. When a co-parenting issue arises where they both meet with Mateo’s teacher, Jane misreads Rafael's intentions and continues pursuing him, embarrassing him in front of his boss and some clients. Rogelio asks Jane for advice with his new project and persuades her to write a proposal. Alba and Jorge pass an immigration interview and finally declare their love for each other. Petra and JR agree to work on their relationship, with JR taking more interest in Petra’s children. Bobby, a minion of Sin Rostro and now Luisa's new neighbor, cozies up to her so as to worm his way into the Solano family, presumably per Sin Rostro's orders.
90	9	"Chapter Ninety"	Gina Rodriguez	Chantelle M. Wells	May 22, 2019	0.48
Jane and Ro successfully pitch the idea for Ro’s new show to the producers and to River Fields. Alba and Jorge get married again in a small church ceremony. Luisa assures Rafael that she is getting her life on track – again – and she asks to be allowed to meet his kids. Jane discovers that Ro secretly promised to repay the publishers if her novel did not sell but she forgives him. Petra and JR continue working out their relationship issues. Rafael finally introduces Luisa to Mateo and just as they are all about to go to the beach, Dennis calls Rafael with the news that Sin Rostro is still working with Luisa. Bobby breaks into Rafael's house.
91	10	"Chapter Ninety-One"	Gina Lamar	Joni Lefkowitz	May 29, 2019	0.56
Jane is stressed from trying to work concurrently on her novel and on the script for Ro’s new show. Ro gets her off the telenovela writing job so she can pursue her true passion – her novel. Mateo is diagnosed with ADHD; at first this escalates the friction between Rafael and Jane. Later things calm down and both agree to have their lawyers modify the custody agreement. Petra and JR try to adjust to a long-distance relationship as JR interviews for a job in Houston, but eventually JR breaks up with Petra. Rafael cuts Luisa out of his life for having her signature all over Rose’s bank documents, despite her best efforts to mollify him. Finally Luisa goes to Bobby, announcing that she’s in, and asks what Rose needs her to do.
92	11	"Chapter Ninety-Two"	Leo Zisman	Liz Sczudlo	June 5, 2019	0.57
Jane and Rafael work out Mateo's new routine. Rafael tells Jane he's going on a date, which leads Jane to accept that she will not be getting back with him as a romantic partner. Petra works at forgetting JR and returns the engagement ring to the store. Xo gets the word from her doctor that she is cancer-free. River Fields oversteps and hits on Ro, angering Xo until things calm down and River accepts that Ro does not want to be with her. Petra re-hires Krishna at triple her old salary. Things are getting cramped at Alba’s house with Jorge living there; Jane decides to move out and get her own place with Mateo.
93	12	"Chapter Ninety-Three"	Melanie Mayron	Carolina Rivera & Madeline Hendricks	June 12, 2019	0.63
Mateo has become very disruptive at school; Jane and Raf are reluctant to put him on meds but after he has too many incidents, they decide together that he needs medication. Rogelio goes crazy after thinking River will get revenge on him for rejecting her advances, not realizing that River's revenge involved doing nothing and watching him go paranoid. Milos threatens Petra that he will sell the hotel. Krishna, Petra’s newly rehired assistant, tells Milos she will secretly work with him to bring Petra down. Jane stalks Raf’s new girlfriend Julie on Instagram and finds out that Julie thinks that she is a clinger. Petra convinces Jane to be the bigger person, so when Raf confesses that he is not into Julie, Jane asks him to make a list of qualities that he wants in The One which is when he realizes he is really in love with Jane and tells her so. The whole cast breaks into song and dance about love, Broadway musical style.
94	13	"Chapter Ninety-Four"	Fernando Sariñana	Valentina L. Garza & Deidre Shaw	June 19, 2019	0.63
Rafael and Jane get engaged; he pushes for a quickie wedding but finally admits his fear that Jane will break up with him again and will choose Michael. Xo explores nursing as a possible career but wants to give up when her lack of a science background seems like a formidable challenge. Alba, who is a nurse, promises to help her study and Xo decides to push through. Krishna double-crosses Milos and gets his two-thirds of the shares of the hotel; we learn that she was secretly working with Petra against Milos, so Petra succeeds in regaining control of the Marbella. Rafael and Jane ultimately decide on a big wedding several months in the future.
95	14	"Chapter Ninety-Five"	Neema Barnette	Liz Sczudlo & Madeline Hendricks	June 26, 2019	0.68
Jane’s old BFF Lina appears and now that she’s a fashion maven, she begins helping Jane with the wedding planning but suddenly admits to fertility problems and asks Jane to donate an egg. Jane must now ponder all the potential ramifications of egg donorship. Raf contemplates returning to work at the Marbella, now that Petra has regained control of the hotel and has offered him a job. Rogelio has a heart issue but is hospitalized and recovers. Jane and Rafael ask Alba to officiate at their wedding. Xo is admitted to nursing school. At the end of the episode, Magda suddenly shows up in the back seat of Petra’s car and threatens her while she is driving. In the last few seconds before the screen goes blank, there is a loud crashing sound, suggesting that they got into an accident.
96	15	"Chapter Ninety-Six"	Viet Nguyen	Ben O'Hara	July 10, 2019	0.67
Petra and Magda survive the accident, but Magda just barely makes it. Jane works hard on finishing her novel. Darci shows up with Baby, and as Rogelio must now bond with her, he realizes he does not want to miss precious time with her like he did with Jane. Rose's latest caper is getting half a dozen women masked as her clones. Jane finally gets an agent.
97	16	"Chapter Ninety-Seven"	Melanie Mayron	Deidre Shaw & Chantelle M. Wells	July 17, 2019	0.60
Jane fears that Mateo may not be her and Raf’s biological child and has his DNA tested. Rogelio helps mend River’s relationship with her daughter. Magda continues to threaten Petra; Alba finally confronts her and films her on her phone, thus getting evidence she could use against Magda. Magda is now sufficiently cowed to leave the country permanently with a $500 monthly payment from Petra. Luisa had actually been working with the police to bring Rose down. Jane decides to confront Rose for all the evil she has done, but moments before the meeting, Rose escapes and is on the loose, as her masked clones hit the streets.
98	17	"Chapter Ninety-Eight"	Gina Lamar	Carolina Rivera	July 24, 2019	0.53
Jane is so traumatized after Rose's escape that she starts seeing a therapist. Her agent tells her that since Michael never signed away his life rights, the book can not be published. Jane meets with Michael, who is now engaged to Charlie and they are pregnant. Charlie initially objects to Michael signing but ultimately changes her mind. Ro and Xo want to move to New York City because River decided to move the show there and Ro wants to keep the role. Ro manages to convince Darci and Esteban to also move to NYC so that he can be near Baby. Rose shows up at Jane and Raf's house and holds Jane hostage for several hours. But Luisa makes a plan with the police and pushes Rose down the stairs when she is distracted, resulting in Rose’s death. Because of this, Jane and Raf welcome Luisa back into their lives. Raf quits working at the Marbella and keeps his real estate job. Jane's book is sold to a publisher for $500,000.
99	18	"Chapter Ninety-Nine" (Note: This episode serves as a behind-the-scenes feature rather than a contributing episode to the series' fictional storyline.)	N/A	N/A	July 31, 2019	0.64
This chapter is not part of the storyline but rather a look back at the entire production of the show as seen through the eyes of the cast, Anthony Mendez, and creator Jennie Snyder Urman. It features snippets of past chapters with explanations of how various components of the show impacted the lives of those involved and social issues in general.
100	19	"Chapter One Hundred"	Brad Silberling	Jennie Snyder Urman	July 31, 2019	0.65
Just before the wedding, Jane works feverishly on rewriting the ending of her book. After feeling hesitant, Xo agrees to move to New York City with Rogelio. In a comical chain of events, Raf ends up getting arrested and Jane hires an entire bus to go bail him out (thus spending her book advance money). The entire wedding party is late to the wedding, and while the guests are assembled and waiting, JR shows up. She and Petra embrace and declare their love for each other, then JR stays for the ceremony. During the wedding ceremony, the narrator reveals his identity: he is Mateo. After the wedding, Jane tells Raf the ending of her book: it’s made into a telenovela.

== Reception ==
=== Ratings ===
Viewership and ratings per episode of Jane the Virgin season 5
No.	Title	Air date	Rating/share (18–49)	Viewers (millions)	DVR (18–49)	DVR viewers (millions)	Total (18–49)	Total viewers (millions)
1	"Chapter Eighty-Two"	March 27, 2019	0.3/2	0.79	0.4	0.77	0.7	1.56
2	"Chapter Eighty-Three"	April 3, 2019	0.2/1	0.61	0.3	0.61	0.5	1.22
3	"Chapter Eighty-Four"	April 10, 2019	0.2/1	0.61	0.4	0.82	0.6	1.43
4	"Chapter Eighty-Five"	April 17, 2019	0.2/2	0.69	0.4	0.69	0.6	1.38
5	"Chapter Eighty-Six"	April 24, 2019	0.2/1	0.58	0.4	0.75	0.6	1.34
6	"Chapter Eighty-Seven"	May 1, 2019	0.2/1	0.59	0.4	0.71	0.6	1.32
7	"Chapter Eighty-Eight"	May 8, 2019	0.3/2	0.71	0.3	0.60	0.6	1.31
8	"Chapter Eighty-Nine"	May 15, 2019	0.2/2	0.62	0.4	0.75	0.6	1.37
9	"Chapter Ninety"	May 22, 2019	0.2/1	0.48	0.3	0.69	0.5	1.22
10	"Chapter Ninety-One"	May 29, 2019	0.2/1	0.56	0.4	0.70	0.6	1.26
11	"Chapter Ninety-Two"	June 5, 2019	0.2/1	0.57	0.3	0.67	0.5	1.24
12	"Chapter Ninety-Three"	June 12, 2019	0.2/1	0.63	0.3	0.63	0.5	1.26
13	"Chapter Ninety-Four"	June 19, 2019	0.2/2	0.63	0.4	0.64	0.6	1.27
14	"Chapter 95"	June 26, 2019	0.2/1	0.68	0.4	0.67	0.6	1.35
15	"Chapter 96"	July 10, 2019	0.2/1	0.67	0.3	0.55	0.5	1.22
16	"Chapter 97"	July 17, 2019	0.2/1	0.60	0.3	0.64	0.5	1.24
17	"Chapter 98"	July 24, 2019	0.2/1	0.53	0.3	0.62	0.5	1.19
18	"Chapter 99"	July 31, 2019	0.2/1	0.64	0.1	0.30	0.3	0.94
19	"Chapter 100"	July 31, 2019	0.2/1	0.65	0.3	0.57	0.5	1.22
