= Jane the Virgin season 2 =

Jane the Virgin
- Season 2
- Jane the Virgin season 2 poster
- Starring: Gina Rodriguez; Andrea Navedo; Yael Grobglas; Justin Baldoni; Ivonne Coll; Brett Dier; Jaime Camil
- No. of episodes: 22

Release
- Original network: The CW
- Original release: October 12, 2015 – May 16, 2016

Season chronology
- ← Previous; Season 1 Next → Season 3

The second season of Jane the Virgin premiered on The CW on October 12, 2015 and ended on May 16, 2016. The season consisted of 22 episodes and stars Gina Rodriguez as a young Latina university student accidentally artificially inseminated with her boss' sperm, Rafael Solano (Justin Baldoni). In this season, after giving birth to Mateo, her and Rafael's son, Jane struggles with motherhood and her love life.

== Cast and characters ==
=== Main ===
- Gina Rodriguez as Jane Gloriana Villanueva
- Andrea Navedo as Xiomara "Xo" Gloriana Villanueva
- Yael Grobglas as Petra Solano and Anezka
- Justin Baldoni as Rafael Solano
- Ivonne Coll as Alba Gloriana Villanueva
- Brett Dier as Michael Cordero, Jr.
- Jaime Camil as Rogelio de la Vega

=== Recurring ===
- Yara Martinez as Dr. Luisa Alver
- Bridget Regan as Rose Solano / Sin Rostro
- Michael Rady as Lachlan
- Diane Guerrero as Lina Santillan
- Azie Tesfai as Detective Nadine Hansen
- Priscilla Barnes as Magda Andel
- Brian Dare as Luca
- Brian Jordan Alvarez as Wesley Masters
- Max Bird-Ridnell as Milos Dvoracek

=== Guest ===
- Britney Spears as herself

== Episodes ==
| No. overall | No. in season | Title | Directed by | Written by | Original release date | U.S. viewers (millions) |
|---|---|---|---|---|---|---|
| 23 | 1 | "Chapter Twenty-Three" | Brad Silberling | Jennie Snyder Urman | October 12, 2015 | 1.06 |
Picking up immediately where Season 1 left off, Jane and everyone else learns about Mateo's kidnapping, especially of Sin Rostro's involvement. Rogelio tweets about Mateo's kidnapping and the family's house is soon surrounded by paparazzi. Michael steps in and arranges for the baby's safe return by handing over an incriminating computer chip from Luisa to Sin Rostro. Jane tries to focus on motherhood and leans on her mother and grandmother for support which makes Rafael feel left out as parent. Meanwhile, Petra contemplates what to do with Rafael's second sperm sample.
| 24 | 2 | "Chapter Twenty-Four" | Edward Ornelas | David S. Rosenthal | October 19, 2015 | 0.84 |
Jane receives Mateo back, but must face the brewing love triangle between her, Michael and Rafael. Jane begins seeing visions of her "bachelorette self" encouraging her to make a choice of whom to be with. Jane also turns into an even more emotional wreck since her baby's abduction and begins to see Rose everywhere she looks. Meanwhile, Xo and Rogelio must perform on a cruise ship as part of contract agreements. Back in Miami, Rafael's smarmy assistant, Scott, blackmails Petra into giving him a raise and a promotion or he will tell Rafael about the theft of the sperm sample. Lachlan returns from his trip and proposes a business deal, but Petra and Rafael do not trust him. Also, Alba decides to make a change in her life after another encounter with the police. Elsewhere, the mysterious thug, that an unseen German woman sends to Miami, abducts Luisa. Kesha guest stars in this episode.
| 25 | 3 | "Chapter Twenty-Five" | Robert Luketic | Corinne Brinkerhoff | October 26, 2015 | 0.94 |
Jane and Rafael plan Mateo's baptism. Jane is given the chance to enter the graduate program in teaching, but she is faced with the dilemma of leaving her son sooner than she expected. Meanwhile, Rafael is struggling to manage Petra's pregnancy with his baby. Xo helps Rogelio overcome his past and Michael asks Jane's father for advice to handle Jane. Ultimately, Petra, Jane and Rafael decide it would be best for Petra to stay in Miami as they try to make it work. Jane is also allowed to stay in her graduate program and, after hearing the good news, is kissed by Rafael. It is not seen whether she rejects this or simply has mixed feelings. Petra, however, takes a picture of the kiss. Elsewhere, a captive Luisa tries to make sense of her situation as she tries to learn the identity of her German abductors. Also, Michael steps up his work on finding Sin Rostro and learns of a new threat and possible third party involved.
| 26 | 4 | "Chapter Twenty-Six" | Zetna Fuentes | Paul Sciarrotta | November 2, 2015 | 1.09 |
Jane accidentally puts a strain between her and Lina's friendship when she forgets to plan Lina's 25th birthday party as she juggles motherhood and school simultaneously. Rafael reveals his feelings to Jane, but he confuses her when he asks for joint custody of their son. Petra tries to convince Michael to help her to keep Jane and Rafael apart and she tells him about witnessing the kiss between Jane and Rafael. Rogelio is a victim of blackmail from his ex-wife and he asks Xo for help. Meanwhile, Michael is assigned a new partner; a feisty young woman named Susanna Barnett, whom he is not very eager to be working with. Later, Luisa is released by her unknown captors and she gives Michael and Susanna a lead to the Sin Rostro case. Jane and Michael share a much more passionate kiss than her kiss with Rafael, and she decides to be with Michael. However, Rafael hears this through the baby monitor.
| 27 | 5 | "Chapter Twenty-Seven" | Jann Turner | Jessica O'Toole & Amy Rardin | November 9, 2015 | 1.11 |
Jane believes she has reached the ending of her love triangle when she considers choosing Michael over Rafael. Meanwhile, Alba has commenced her citizenship request, but Xo's past involving taking the rap for of grand larceny for an old boyfriend interferes with the process. Britney Spears checks into the Marbella, and Rogelio is determined to confront her. Michael is so lost in his ongoing battle for Jane with Rafael that he gets into trouble at work while he is unaware that his new partner, Susanna, is an undercover Internal Affairs agent hired by his superior officer, Lt. Armstrong, to investigate him for corruption. Elsewhere, Petra is given a deal by Milos that she just can not refuse despite her distrusting him.
| 28 | 6 | "Chapter Twenty-Eight" | Melanie Mayron | Corinne Brinkerhoff & Micah Schraft | November 16, 2015 | 1.10 |
In this episode, spanning over six months, Jane and Rafael begin planning for Mateo's future. However, Jane learns Mateo will inherit a lot of money, and she worries that he will be spoiled. Meanwhile, Jane has finally begun her graduate program, but her stern and intimidating professor is not on Jane's side and is unsympathetic to her inability to meet deadlines and raise her baby all at once. Rogelio's TV show comes to an end, so he decides to create another show of his own with himself being the star, producer and director. Petra finds out what is she having in her sham marriage with Milos and turns to Jane for help to get her mother out of prison. When Magda is finally released, she plots with Petra to get rid of Milos by exposing his arms smuggling operation. Elsewhere, a disgraced Michael, having lost everything, is abducted by his former partner Nadine who makes him an offer to join Sin Rostro's criminal organization. Michael's response and actions afterwards are ambiguous.
| 29 | 7 | "Chapter Twenty-Nine" | Edward Ornelas | David S. Rosenthal & Dara Resnick Creasey | November 23, 2015 | 0.98 |
Jane, her family and Rafael go Black Friday Shopping at Target where Jane accidentally bumps into Michael. It is revealed (to the viewers) that Michael was not actually fired but has been working undercover for the past six months, during which time he has tried to zero in on Sin Rostro and lost Nadine (after she was shot and killed trying to protect him from an unknown hitman). After failing to convince Hollywood that "Hombres Locos" must be produced, Rogelio decides go back to his original studio and accept any job they throw at him, fearing he would not be able to maintain his ostentatious lifestyle otherwise. Xiomara finally makes some progress in her music career, but hits a snag due to Rogelio's meddling. Meanwhile, Rafael and Jane start searching for babysitters for Mateo while they go on a date, however, after the date Jane discovers some unsettling news about Rafael. Elsewhere, Petra is trying to help Magda with her crazy plan regarding what to do with Ivan's dead body and how to get it out of the hotel. Also, Luisa makes a startling revelation about her late mother.
| 30 | 8 | "Chapter Thirty" | Uta Briesewitz | Paul Sciarrotta & Carolina Rivera | December 14, 2015 | 0.98 |
Jane is still angry at Rafael that he lied and paid someone to report Michael but tries to keep calm. In addition to this, she discovers that she did not receive a need-based scholarship for her grad school as originally thought, but that Rogelio has secretly been paying for it. In order to come up with the money herself, she tries to land a TA position and write a short story in a thriller/sci-fi/historical genre for a short story contest. Meanwhile, Rogelio gets a new assistant but still cannot get over his friendship with Michael, at the same time been apprehensive of Jane's dismissal of Rafael because of his own history with his child. Michael gets ever so closer to finding the notorious drug-lord Mutter, the rival to Sin Rostro, a revelation that further shakes Luisa when she learns that Mutter may in fact be her long-thought dead mother. Elsewhere, Petra comes clean to Rafael about her mother killing Ivan, but Magda has other plans, by having Petra arrested, who faces prison time. Alba also finally gets her green card.
| 31 | 9 | "Chapter Thirty-One" | Joanna Kerns | Emmylou Diaz & Jessica O'Toole & Amy Rardin | January 25, 2016 | 0.99 |
Rogelio's mom Liliana (guest star Rita Moreno) visits Miami to meet her great-grandson for the first time, but comes without her husband and Rogelio's father Manuel. She privately reveals to Jane that Manuel is actually gay and is leaving her for a man after 47 years of marriage. After Jane shares this with her family, Rogelio talks with his mom and also invites his dad to come along, which brings up new secrets to the surface. Meanwhile, Petra is facing jail after being accused by her mother of killing Ivan, and after a heat-to-heart talk with Rafael, they manage to prove Magda is the guilty one. Also, Jane, Alba and Xiomara are trying to sleep-train Mateo to curb his crying fits, and Jane and Alba have contrasting views on how to do this. Alba finally shows Jane that sometimes tough love is what is needed, something Jane tries to use on her first college class as a TA to mixed results when she tries to persuade a slacker basketball player to write his assignment paper. Rafael, after being spurred by his honest conversations with Petra, finally contacts his mother again, while Michael and Jane come to an understating about their relationship. Elsewhere, Luisa discovers her mother is definitely dead and is not Mutter. Luisa also finally makes her move on Susanna who quickly rejects Luisa. At the end, Rafael finally discovers the real identity of Mutter.
| 32 | 10 | "Chapter Thirty-Two" | Jason Reilly | Micah Schraft | February 1, 2016 | 1.04 |
In the middle of the night, Jane gets a burst of creative energy and starts her thesis. Unfortunately, Baby Mateo spills orange juice all over her computer causing it to crash and Jane loses all her hard work. When Jane brings her computer to be fixed, she meets Dax, a guy who works at the computer store, and with the urging of her friend Lina, Jane considers dating again. Meanwhile, Rogelio decides to have his mother Liliana become his manager, but soon realizes that was not the best decision. When Rafael awakens after being attacked by his mother now known to be the crime lord Mutter, he goes to Michael and tells him what Mutter is looking for. Michael then flashes back to his time with Nadine while deep undercover in Mexico and comes to learn where Nadine was hiding the computer chip she was supposed to deliver to Sin Rostro. Elsewhere, Petra is ordered to take bed rest for one week which she proves to be a handful for Rafael who is looking after her.
| 33 | 11 | "Chapter Thirty-Three" | Uta Briesewitz | Michael J. Cinquemani | February 8, 2016 | 0.94 |
Jane's crush on Professor Chavez is popping up in her dreams and she needs to evaluate her feelings towards him. But each time Jane tries to make her move on Chavez, he keeps throwing the emotional barriers up. Meanwhile, Xo and Jane find Liliana's engagement ring and think that Rogelio is going to propose. Rogelio IS planning to propose, but with a different ring, one that gets swallowed accidentally by Mateo. Also, Michael comes to a realization about Rose and Mutter when he discovers a connection between them. Elsewhere, Rafael and Petra try to bring in more business for the hotel by meeting with Izzie Hillcroft, a famous artist, who holds a personal grudge against Petra. Also, Luisa continues to make the moves on Susanna who rejects Luisa a second time, but only for the reason that Susanna still sees that Luisa still had lingering feelings for Rose.
| 34 | 12 | "Chapter Thirty-Four" | Howard Deutch | Madeline Hendricks | February 22, 2016 | 0.94 |
Jane is considering whether or not to take her relationship with Jonathan to the next level and turns to Xo for advice. Xo and Rogelio have their own relationship issues to work out. Meanwhile, as a favor to Rafael, Jane agrees to help Petra by throwing her a baby shower. Luisa is in a terrible car accident, but all is not as it seems. Michael comes to a realization he must share with Jane.
| 35 | 13 | "Chapter Thirty-Five" | Melanie Mayron | Chantelle M. Wells | February 29, 2016 | 0.91 |
Jane and Michael are back together. Jane attempts to get Rafael and Michael to reconcile, but it does not go well. While Rafael is sulking over losing Jane, he is ignoring Petra and her pregnancy needs. Xo and Rogelio have broken up over the baby issue, but they are still acting like a couple, something Jane sees as a problem. Rogelio hires a new assistant, Paola, who appears too good to be true.
| 36 | 14 | "Chapter Thirty-Six" | Uta Briesewitz | Jessica O'Toole & Amy Rardin | March 7, 2016 | 0.92 |
Jane and Petra attempt to stop Rafael's spiral into self-destruction until they realise that he is working undercover with the police to try to find his half-brother Derek and Mutter, his crimelord mother. Xiomara finds out about her mother's previous sexual encounters and confronts her on them, eventually inviting her mother's ex-lover to stay with them in their home. Jane and Michael re-examine their relationship and the reasons that led to their break-up leading to Michael proposing (again) to Jane. Jane is outraged when she discovers that her favourite author plagiarised her manuscript and goes to confront her on it, just as Petra goes into labour. Petra gives birth, naming her twin daughters Anna and Elsa. Rogelio is being kept hostage by Paola - who is actually his stalker - and manages to drug her in an attempt to escape. She wakes up enraged and attacks him with one of his own trophies.
| 37 | 15 | "Chapter Thirty-Seven" | Melanie Mayron | Sarah Goldfinger | March 21, 2016 | 0.77 |
Jane is struggling to be liked by Michael's parents after she learns that they are resentful towards her previous break up with Michael. She is also having trouble with her new advisor, who is seemingly harsh at Jane's writing as she is trying to pass the Bechdel test. Michael is sent out to find Rogelio at Jane's request and they all find out he was kidnapped. Alba finally meets Pablo and goes out on a date with him despite her fear of him being cursed. Rafael meets with his half brother, Derek and after a deep talk he decides that he is telling the truth about his whereabouts when their mother was found to be a drug lord, but Michael feels otherwise as he thinks Rafael is just being played. Petra is struggling fitting into her new mother role but with encouragement from Rafael, she starts to warm up to the idea.
| 38 | 16 | "Chapter Thirty-Eight" | Georgina Garcia Riedel | Micah Schraft | March 28, 2016 | 0.94 |
A flood hits Jane's home, disrupting her wedding plans with Michael. Meanwhile, Jane and her dad clash over how big a wedding she should have; Rafael objects to Jane moving 45 minutes away with Mateo; and Petra continues to struggle with motherhood avoiding her babies as much as possible.
| 39 | 17 | "Chapter Thirty-Nine" | Matthew Diamond | Carolina Rivera | April 11, 2016 | 0.93 |
Jane's bachelorette party does not go her way; Michael's future father-in-law tries to plan the perfect bachelor party; Rafael tries to figure out his half-brother's motives but gives him the benefit of the doubt. He wakes up to find he has invested in shares that made a lot of money overnight and it looks like his half-brother's friend gave him an insider trading tip.
| 40 | 18 | "Chapter Forty" | Anna Mastro | Jessica O'Toole & Amy Rardin | April 18, 2016 | 0.96 |
Michael volunteers to watch Mateo for Jane; Rafael gets upset by the growing bond between Michael and Mateo. Rogelio turns to his favorite writer to get him out of a jam. After attending a parent and baby group with Jane, Petra sees a specialist about possible postpartum depression. She then visits her mother in prison to ask if she had ppd - it can be genetic. Her mother says, of course, behind the iron curtain everyone was depressed!
| 41 | 19 | "Chapter Forty-One" | Gina Lamar | Joe Lawson | April 25, 2016 | 0.84 |
After Michael is fired from the police force, Jane takes on more shifts at Marbella to earn extra money. Jane is forced to pair up with Petra's slow-witted sister to help her with her first job. Meanwhile, Jane and Rafael go to a mediator to arrange a formal custody agreement for baby Mateo. Elsewhere, Xo takes an acting role alongside Rogelio and soon figures out his tryst with his series writer.
| 42 | 20 | "Chapter Forty-Two" | Zetna Fuentes | Micah Schraft & Paul Sciarrotta | May 2, 2016 | 0.86 |
Jane looks forward to a Mother's Day tradition with the Villanueva women until Petra changes plans. A mysterious ad in a college newspaper puts Jane's TA position in jeopardy.
| 43 | 21 | "Chapter Forty-Three" | Melanie Mayron | Jessica O'Toole & Amy Rardin & Paul Sciarrotta | May 9, 2016 | 0.90 |
Plans for Mateo's first birthday celebration falter when Jane learns there might be an issue with her wedding venue. Jane and Petra disagree on how Rafael should deal with his troubles, and Michael believes Derek is in cahoots with Mutter.
| 44 | 22 | "Chapter Forty-Four" | Jann Turner | Paul Sciarrotta & Jennie Snyder Urman | May 16, 2016 | 0.97 |
After moving up the wedding day, Jane and Michael find all their carefully made plans thrown into chaos. Worse still, Jane is unhappy with her current graduate thesis, but changing it might put a hold on her wedding day. After being reinstated on the police force with a promotion following the arrest of Mutter, Michael believes that there is something he missed after finally closing the case. Meanwhile, Rafael still has feelings for Jane, but is torn about whether he should speak now or forever hold his peace. Petra has her own family drama when scheming twin sister Anezka has a medical emergency and ends up in the hospital. Also, Rogelio and Xo are finally coming to terms with the state of their relationship until Xo gets surprising news. In another series of season-ending cliff hanging plot twists, Anezka's devious plans are finally revealed, and Michael's life is in doubt as a recurring character thought to be dead is revealed to be still alive, and another recurring character thought to be alive is already dead. Bruno Mars guest stars in this episode.

== Ratings ==
Viewership and ratings per episode of Jane the Virgin season 2
| No. | Title | Air date | Rating/share (18–49) | Viewers (millions) | DVR (18–49) | DVR viewers (millions) | Total (18–49) | Total viewers (millions) |
|---|---|---|---|---|---|---|---|---|
| 1 | "Chapter Twenty-Three" | October 12, 2015 | 0.4/1 | 1.06 | 0.4 | 0.69 | 0.8 | 1.76 |
| 2 | "Chapter Twenty-Four" | October 19, 2015 | 0.4/1 | 0.84 | —N/a | 0.68 | —N/a | 1.52 |
| 3 | "Chapter Twenty-Five" | October 26, 2015 | 0.3/1 | 0.94 | 0.3 | 0.56 | 0.6 | 1.51 |
| 4 | "Chapter Twenty-Six" | November 2, 2015 | 0.4/1 | 1.09 | 0.4 | 0.71 | 0.8 | 1.81 |
| 5 | "Chapter Twenty-Seven" | November 9, 2015 | 0.4/1 | 1.11 | 0.3 | 0.65 | 0.7 | 1.76 |
| 6 | "Chapter Twenty-Eight" | November 16, 2015 | 0.5/2 | 1.10 | —N/a | 0.55 | —N/a | 1.67 |
| 7 | "Chapter Twenty-Nine" | November 23, 2015 | 0.4/1 | 0.98 | 0.3 | 0.62 | 0.7 | 1.60 |
| 8 | "Chapter Thirty" | December 14, 2015 | 0.3/1 | 0.98 | 0.4 | 0.63 | 0.7 | 1.61 |
| 9 | "Chapter Thirty-One" | January 25, 2016 | 0.4/1 | 0.99 | 0.3 | 0.69 | 0.7 | 1.68 |
| 10 | "Chapter Thirty-Two" | February 1, 2016 | 0.4/1 | 1.04 | 0.3 | 0.66 | 0.7 | 1.70 |
| 11 | "Chapter Thirty-Three" | February 8, 2016 | 0.3/1 | 0.94 | 0.4 | 0.74 | 0.7 | 1.68 |
| 12 | "Chapter Thirty-Four" | February 22, 2016 | 0.3/1 | 0.94 | 0.4 | 0.72 | 0.7 | 1.66 |
| 13 | "Chapter Thirty-Five" | February 29, 2016 | 0.3/1 | 0.91 | 0.4 | 0.70 | 0.7 | 1.61 |
| 14 | "Chapter Thirty-Six" | March 7, 2016 | 0.4/1 | 0.92 | 0.3 | 0.68 | 0.7 | 1.60 |
| 15 | "Chapter Thirty-Seven" | March 21, 2016 | 0.3/1 | 0.77 | 0.3 | 0.66 | 0.6 | 1.43 |
| 16 | "Chapter Thirty-Eight" | March 28, 2016 | 0.4/1 | 0.94 | 0.3 | 0.69 | 0.7 | 1.63 |
| 17 | "Chapter Thirty-Nine" | April 11, 2016 | 0.4/1 | 0.97 | 0.3 | 0.69 | 0.7 | 1.66 |
| 18 | "Chapter Forty" | April 18, 2016 | 0.4/1 | 0.96 | 0.4 | 0.68 | 0.8 | 1.64 |
| 19 | "Chapter Forty-One" | April 25, 2016 | 0.4/1 | 0.84 | 0.3 | 0.74 | 0.7 | 1.58 |
| 20 | "Chapter Forty-Two" | May 2, 2016 | 0.3/1 | 0.86 | 0.4 | 0.69 | 0.7 | 1.54 |
| 21 | "Chapter Forty-Three" | May 9, 2016 | 0.3/1 | 0.90 | 0.4 | 0.66 | 0.7 | 1.56 |
| 22 | "Chapter Forty-Four" | May 16, 2016 | 0.4/1 | 0.97 | 0.3 | 0.70 | 0.7 | 1.66 |

== Home media ==
The Complete Second Season
| Set details | | | Special features |
| 22 episodes; 929 minutes (Region 1); 5-disc set; 1.78:1 aspect ratio; Languages: English (Dolby Digital 2.0) | | | |
Release dates
| United States | United Kingdom | Australia | |
| June 16, 2017 | | March 1, 2017 | |
