= Jane the Virgin season 1 =

Jane the Virgin
- Season 1
- Jane the Virgin season 1 poster
- Starring: Gina Rodriguez; Andrea Navedo; Yael Grobglas; Justin Baldoni; Ivonne Coll; Brett Dier; Jaime Camil
- No. of episodes: 22

Release
- Original network: The CW
- Original release: October 13, 2014 – May 11, 2015

Season chronology
- Next → Season 2

The first season of Jane the Virgin premiered on The CW on October 13, 2014 and ended on May 11, 2015. The season consisted of 22 episodes and stars Gina Rodriguez as a young Latina university student accidentally artificially inseminated with her boss' sperm, Rafael Solano (Justin Baldoni). For her performance, Rodriguez won the Golden Globe Award for Best Actress – Television Series, Musical or Comedy.

== Cast and characters ==
=== Main ===
- Gina Rodriguez as Jane Gloriana Villanueva
- Andrea Navedo as Xiomara "Xo" Gloriana Villanueva
- Yael Grobglas as Petra Solano
- Justin Baldoni as Rafael Solano
- Ivonne Coll as Alba Gloriana Villanueva
- Brett Dier as Michael Cordero, Jr.
- Jaime Camil as Rogelio de la Vega

=== Recurring ===
- Yara Martinez as Dr. Luisa Alver
- Bridget Regan as Rose Solano / Sin Rostro
- Carlo Rota as Emilio Solano
- Michael Rady as Lachlan
- Diane Guerrero as Lina Santillan
- Azie Tesfai as Detective Nadine Hansan
- Brian Dare as Luca
- Alano Miller as Roman Zazo
- Priscilla Barnes as Magda

== Episodes ==
No. overall	No. in season	Title	Directed by	Written by	Original release date	U.S. viewers (millions)
1	1	"Chapter One" "Pilot"	Brad Silberling	Teleplay by : Jennie Snyder Urman	October 13, 2014	1.61
The series opens on a 23-year-old Jane working at a hotel to finance her studies and saving herself for marriage. Her life is turned upside down when she is accidentally artificially inseminated by a distraught doctor. Jane is caught between her boyfriend Michael, who has no desire to raise another man's child, and Rafael, the owner of the sperm and the doctor's brother, whose battle with cancer makes this his only chance for a biological child. Petra, Rafael's wife, also wants the baby – but only to prolong her failing marriage while the pre-nuptial agreement is still in effect, as the financial payoff would be huge. Petra is also revealed to be having an affair. Meanwhile, Jane's mother, Xiomara, and grandmother Alba have their own opinions about what Jane should do, influenced by Xiomara's unplanned pregnancy with Jane at a young age. Flashback: A 10-year-old Jane's fiercely religious grandmother, Alba, makes her hold a white flower, then tells her to crumple it. After failing to restore the beauty of the flower, Alba tells the young Jane that her virginity is just like the flower.
2	2	"Chapter Two"	Uta Briesewitz	Jennie Snyder Urman	October 20, 2014	1.36
Jane doubts her decision to keep the baby when she stumbles upon Rafael's bad-boy past. Michael discovers that he and Petra have mutual interests, which puts him in a difficult position professionally. Xiomara pressures Jane to sue Dr. Alver, who turns to a surprising source for support. Rafael has no sympathy for his sister, until he realizes that a lawsuit against her could mean financial loss for him. Meanwhile Xiomara encounters Rogelio, Jane's father, who tries to persuade her into reuniting him with their daughter.
3	3	"Chapter Three"	Brad Silberling	Meredith Averill	October 27, 2014	1.09
Jane contemplates a major decision regarding her and Michael's relationship, eliciting contradictory advice from her mother and grandmother. Petra pressures Michael, and when Jane accidentally witnesses one of their furtive meetings, she and Michael fight. Jane gets to know Rafael better, with unintended emotional results. Xiomara continues to stall Rogelio, who, getting impatient, takes action of his own.
4	4	"Chapter Four"	Debbie Allen	Corinne Brinkerhoff	November 3, 2014	1.01
Jane fights her growing feelings for Rafael, which gives both her and Michael second thoughts about their impending wedding. Michael continues trying to prevent Petra's arrest. Rafael's father, Emilio, doubts his son's ability to run the hotel. Meanwhile, Luisa has disappeared. Rogelio ensures that his and Jane's paths cross several more times. Xiomara finally tells Jane about the real identity of her father -- as opposed to what she has told her daughter prior. Jane is left devastated, feeling betrayed by her mother's lies.
5	5	"Chapter Five"	Edward Ornelas	Josh Reims	November 10, 2014	1.22
Having learned the truth about her biological father, Jane is angry at Xiomara for keeping it a secret. As a result, Jane moves in with her fiancé Michael in order to sort out her feelings. Jane decides to meet Rogelio at the studio for the first time, and he's not the type of person she expected him to be. Rafael wants to divorce Petra after finding out about her affair with Roman Zazo. Petra's mother, Magda, persuades her to take an alternate approach in order to acquire the hotel and Rafael's money. Another hotel employee is found murdered and Michael confides in Rafael about the police investigation into the hotel's finances, and Zazo's underworld connections. Also, Michael's career criminal brother arrives in town and Michael does his best to keep it to himself. While cleaning up at Michael's apartment, Jane finds out that Michael has not told her about Petra and Zazo's affair.
6	6	"Chapter Six"	Jann Turner	Paul Sciarrotta	November 17, 2014	1.09
With Michael and Rafael keeping secrets from her, Jane decides to focus on her relationship with Rogelio and meets his teenage stepdaughters. Jane tries to bond with them, but soon realizes their devious and manipulative nature. Meanwhile, Rogelio tries to persuade Xo to hire his band to perform at the nightclub where she works. Under pressure by her family to speed up her scam, Petra has Rafael arrested by framing him for domestic abuse. Meanwhile, Jane must decide where she stands on her relationship with Michael. Rafael gets closer to Jane, and makes a decision about what to do with his growing feelings towards her.
7	7	"Chapter Seven"	Janice Cooke	David S. Rosenthal	November 24, 2014	0.96
Jane describes her meeting with Rafael five years ago to Xo, who warns her that he might be a playboy. After sharing a kiss, Rafael wants to pursue a relationship with Jane, and she must make a decision. Meanwhile, Michael has made progress in his investigation of a criminal referred to as Sin Rostro. After deciding that it is best for them to not pursue a relationship, Xiomara and Rogelio find other romantic interests and go on a double date. Rafael goes to Mexico City to look for his sister, who has gone missing, in order to save his hotel.
8	8	"Chapter Eight"	Norman Buckley	Josh Reims & Carolina Rivera	December 8, 2014	1.22
Set two weeks after the last episode, Rafael tells Jane that he was not able to find his sister. On the day of the proceedings regarding Jane's lawsuit, Luisa shows up, complicating the case. Xiomara dates the father of one of the students in her dance class, which makes Rogelio jealous. In order to stop Luisa from telling the truth about their affair, Rose tells Rafael that Luisa is having delusions, forcing their father to commit Luisa to a psychiatric ward. The whole case makes Jane's grandmother very nervous, and it is revealed that Alba is an undocumented immigrant from Venezuela. Jane decides to drop the case, and Rafael tells her the truth about the lawsuit.
9	9	"Chapter Nine"	Zetna Fuentes	Corinne Brinkerhoff	December 15, 2014	1.28
Xiomara meets her childhood idol Paulina Rubio when she attends an awards show with Rogelio, who is expecting to win best actor in a telenovela. Meanwhile, Petra escalates her personal war against Rafael to get her hands on more of his money while her captive/blackmailer, Ivan, plots a way to escape her and Magda's room. Petra's background story is revealed. Michael begins to suspect that Rafael is or may know the shadowy criminal referred to as Sin Rostro. Michael finds evidence in an office safe revealing false passports and cash, but the documents disappear. Jane finds out a story she wrote about Xiomara's lurid past is going to be published, and is worried about Xo finding out. Jane and Rafael make a background check on Petra and learn that her name and past references are false. When a drunk Alba stumbles upon the captive Ivan, Magda attempts to murder her.
10	10	"Chapter Ten"	Elodie Keene	Meredith Averill & Christopher Oscar Peña	January 19, 2015	1.39
A hurricane hits Miami and Jane is forced to stay at the Marbella Hotel, which puts her in close proximity to both Rafael and Michael. Rogelio rushes to Xo's side in the hospital, with Alba in critical condition after her assault. Rafael resumes his role as the Marbella's boss and considers some tough layoffs. Alba is threatened with deportation in the hospital. Ivan finally escapes from Petra and Magda's captivity, but must wait out the storm with them. Luisa, still confined to the psychiatric ward, receives a visit from Rose, who wants to continue their romance-with one caveat. Michael suspects that Rafael is not who he appears to be after stumbling across a medical lab beneath the hotel which performs plastic surgery on fugitives. Rafael continues to deny any criminal connections to the shadowy Sin Rostro, and convinces Jane that Michael's accusations are rooted in jealousy. Alba wakes up from her coma, but has no memory of what happened to her. After doing some investigation of her own, Rose confides in Rafael that she suspects that his own father may be Sin Rostro.
11	11	"Chapter Eleven"	Joanna Kerns	Gracie Glassmeyer	January 26, 2015	1.55
Jane is torn when she is offered a permanent position at a Catholic middle school and a writing internship at Rogelio's telenovela. Xo struggles to keep her promise of chastity. Michael goes against his boss's orders when his suspicion that Rafael is involved with Sin Rostro grows. Rafael begins his own investigation of the mysterious underground surgery center. Jane invites Rafael over for dinner, where he makes waves with Xo and Alba with his comments on stay-at-home parenting. Petra becomes worried that her former gangster lover, Milos, will come looking for her and asks Lachlan for assistance to help move her to another hotel.
12	12	"Chapter Twelve"	Gina Lamar	David S. Rosenthal	February 2, 2015	1.24
Jane gets her big break, but she correctly suspects Rogelio is involved in getting her the writing job. She also learns that her first work assignment is to write a script which kills off Rogelio's character. Rafael continues to be skeptical of Rose's accusations against his father. Petra's past finally catches up with her when her former lover, Milos, arrives and is determined to win her back any way he can-which includes revealing Magda's secret. Jane and Rafael visit Luisa in the hospital, where Luisa gives Jane a confidential letter for Rose. Michael, despite being suspended from the police force due to Nadine ratting him out, continues his own investigation with more determination than ever. In a shocking twist ending, a recurring character is killed off, and the identity of Sin Rostro is finally revealed.
13	13	"Chapter Thirteen"	Howard Deutch	Josh Reims	February 9, 2015	1.34
Jane and Rafael are eager to know the baby's sex, but during a routine ultrasound, get some nerve-wracking news and must make a hard decision. Jane is put on bed rest for 48 hours and may have to miss her graduation. Alba has developed a crush on a fellow man in her physical therapy class. Rogelio decides to start looking for a new acting job, but his ego and fussiness get in the way. Michael believes he has found out Sin Rostro's identity, but must capture him before he flees. The pieces of the puzzle finally come together for Michael and Nadine, and they discover the true identity of Sin Rostro. Petra is torn between two men in her life-the charming but shady Lachlan, and the ill-tempered and abusive Milos.
14	14	"Chapter Fourteen"	Brad Silberling	Paul Sciarrotta	February 16, 2015	1.31
Michael attempts to convince Jane that Rafael was hiding his father's criminal activities as Roman Zazo's brother, Aaron, arrives in town. Jane urges Xo and Rogelio to reveal their true feelings to each other about Rogelio's job offer, which would take him away from Miami. Petra discovers a new way to make Rafael's life more miserable. Jane questions her future with Rafael when her friends and co-workers throw her a baby shower. Rafael finally has Luisa released from the psych ward. Luisa's cooperation with Michael reveals the burial location of her and Rafael's murdered father. Petra takes advantage of Luisa's continuing unbalanced mental state to manipulate her into giving up the majority of the Marbella Hotel's stock shares. Luisa gets in contact with Rose and skips town to join her abroad.
15	15	"Chapter Fifteen"	Melanie Mayron	Emmylou Diaz & David S. Rosenthal	March 9, 2015	1.26
Jane and Rafael receive exciting news about their baby's health. They return to the topic of moving in together and Rafael surprises Jane. Alba gives bad advice to Jane and Xo. Meanwhile, Petra makes an ally of Rafael when Lachlan attempts to blackmail her to resign her co-ownership of the hotel. Michael informs Jane about her favorite author visiting the Marbella, with upsetting results for Rafael.
16	16	"Chapter Sixteen"	Joanna Kerns	Josh Reims & Carolina Rivera	March 16, 2015	1.10
When Jane gets a case of writer's block due to the tension between her and Rafael, she signs herself up for a romance writing workshop. Petra tries to find a musical performer for the Mirabella's Calle Ocho celebration, but it forces her to team up with Rafael to ask Rogelio for help. Rogelio is struggling with his new character as a detective, and asks to tag along with Michael at work for the experience. Michael is investigating Roman Zazo's murder by tailing a suspected drug dealer. Elsewhere, Xo makes a decision to move in with Rogelio which causes a rift between her and Alba.
17	17	"Chapter Seventeen"	Uta Briesewitz	Amy Rardin & Jessica O'Toole	April 6, 2015	0.93
Jane does more research about pregnancy and nursing and volunteers to babysit for her new friend Andie's infant niece. Jane is unaware that Andie is Michael's former girlfriend and has ulterior motives in her befriending of Jane. Meanwhile, Rafael and Petra become overwhelmed while planning a party to bring in more business for the failing Marbella. When things take a turn for the worse, Rafael's reaction makes Jane question his ability to be a good parent. Xo and Alba continue to be estranged following Xo's move-in with Rogelio, who is oblivious to the growing intensity of her feelings for him. Rogelio and Michael grow closer as friends, which makes both Jane and Rafael uncomfortable. Elsewhere, Petra continues to be curious about Aaron Zazo, and beings to suspect that Aaron may, in fact, be Roman.
18	18	"Chapter Eighteen"	Edward Ornelas	Meredith Averill	April 13, 2015	1.03
After Jane unintentionally ruins Rafael's chances of getting the hotel's liquor license back, he persuades her to become chummy with the antagonistic city counsel-woman Alexis to make things right. Rafael gets information about his birth mother from the private detective he has hired, but the long-awaited reunion does not go as expected. Rogelio's vain and shallow mother, Liliana (guest star Rita Moreno), comes for a visit, and she and Xo do not get along. Alba takes a big step in her growing romance with Edward (guest star Cheech Marin) by asking him out on a date, but finds out from Jane that he happens to be a priest. Jane finally finds out that Michael is Andie's former boyfriend, but says nothing, hoping Michael will move on with someone else. Elsewhere, Petra becomes more convinced that Aaron is actually Roman and enlists Michael's help to get confirmation.
19	19	"Chapter Nineteen"	Robert Luketic	Emmylou Diaz & David S. Rosenthal	April 20, 2015	1.05
Jane becomes desperate to fix things with Rafael and suggests couple's therapy. Lina throws a baby shower for Jane, and Rafael realizes that although he does love Jane, their differences may preclude a happy future together. Jane finally confronts Andie and is forced to come clean to Michael about it. Xo has been keeping a secret from Rogelio and comes clean, surprised by his reaction. Alba realizes who pushed her down the stairs when she sees Magda from a distance. Still dealing with the Sin Rostro aftermath, Michael makes an upsetting discovery about who was involved in stopping his investigation all along. Petra finds herself in a dire situation with Roman/Aaron in a remote cabin in a swamp.
20	20	"Chapter Twenty"	Debbie Allen	Corinne Brinkerhoff & Paul Sciarrotta	April 27, 2015	1.06
Jane deals with the aftermath of her breakup with Rafael, feeling pressured to do things on her own. Jane reports the new evidence about Alba's accident to Michael. Petra's mother returns to Florida. Xiomara attempts to fix things with Rogelio, but the egotistical actor is not quick to forgive despite his own shortcomings. Luisa returns to town with a new girlfriend, a pro wrestler, and suggests holding a "wrestling brawl" to bring in some quick money and publicity for the hotel. Alba and Edward go on a date, despite some misgivings on Alba's part. When Petra, Magda, and their former captive Ivan cover up the attempt on Alba's life and Rafael buys their story, Jane decides to take action.
21	21	"Chapter Twenty-One"	Stuart Gillard	Jessica O'Toole & Amy Rardin	May 4, 2015	1.05
Jane tells Rafael her decision to sue him for sole custody of the baby. Petra tries to fix the issue after Rafael confides in Petra about Jane's decision. Jane's high school reunion looms, forcing Jane to reflect upon the fact that her life is not where she would have expected it to be. Xo and Rogelio rehearse for their show, but Xo remains confused about Rogelio's odd behaviour. Jane agrees to attend Michael's police force commendation, but sets a few ground rules.
22	22	"Chapter Twenty-Two"	Zetna Fuentes	Josh Reims & Jennie Snyder Urman	May 11, 2015	1.24
Jane goes into false labor, but she insists her parents go to their show in Las Vegas, Nevada. However, when they leave, Jane goes into actual labor, and Xo attempts everything she can to return to Florida. Michael and Rafael try to make things easier for Jane during her labor, but their presence causes tension. Alba is excited to tell her special friend about the baby's arrival. Meanwhile, Petra discovers some worrisome news about Rafael and contemplates whether or not to tell him. Michael's former beat partner, Nadine, shows up and wants to cooperate in helping him track down Sin Rostro. Jane gives birth to a baby boy and names him Mateo Gloriano Rogelio Solano Villanueva. Nadine escapes from Michael's custody, which works in his favour. Xo and Rogelio learn that they got married during a drunken bender back in Vegas. A nurse quietly snatches Jane's baby from the nursery at the hospital and gives it to Rose who takes the baby away with her in a limousine for places unknown.

== Production and development ==
On June 27, 2013, American television network The CW announced that it was planning to release a new show based on the Venezuelan soap opera Juana La Virgen. On February 23, 2014, Entertainment Weekly announced that Rodriguez would play the title role of Jane Villanueva. On May 8, 2014, during The CW's 2014–2015 upfronts, the series was officially picked up. On July 18, 2014, an extended trailer was released by The CW. On August 8, 2014, it was announced that White Collar's Bridget Regan and Azie Tesfai would join the series as respectively Rose, a former lawyer, and Detective Nadine Hansan, a police detective and rival to Dier's character. On August 10, 2014, TVLine announced that Melrose Place and Emily Owens, M.D. actor Michael Rady would join the series as Lachlan. Filming for season one commenced on July 28, 2014. The show is filmed on soundstages in Los Angeles and the pilot was filmed in Huntington Beach, California. On October 21, 2014, the show was given a full season order.

== Ratings ==
Viewership and ratings per episode of Jane the Virgin season 1
No.	Title	Air date	Rating/share (18–49)	Viewers (millions)	DVR (18–49)	DVR viewers (millions)	Total (18–49)	Total viewers (millions)
1	"Chapter One"	October 13, 2014	0.6/2	1.61	—N/a	—N/a	—N/a	—N/a
2	"Chapter Two"	October 20, 2014	0.5/1	1.36	—N/a	—N/a	—N/a	—N/a
3	"Chapter Three"	October 27, 2014	0.4/1	1.09	0.3	—N/a	0.7	—N/a
4	"Chapter Four"	November 3, 2014	0.4/2	1.01	—N/a	—N/a	—N/a	—N/a
5	"Chapter Five"	November 10, 2014	0.5/1	1.22	—N/a	—N/a	—N/a	—N/a
6	"Chapter Six"	November 17, 2014	0.4/1	1.11	0.3	—N/a	0.7	—N/a
7	"Chapter Seven"	November 24, 2014	0.4/1	0.96	—N/a	—N/a	—N/a	—N/a
8	"Chapter Eight"	December 8, 2014	0.5/1	1.22	0.3	—N/a	0.8	—N/a
9	"Chapter Nine"	December 15, 2014	0.5/2	1.28	0.3	0.62	0.8	1.90
10	"Chapter Ten"	January 19, 2015	0.5/1	1.39	0.3	—N/a	0.8	—N/a
11	"Chapter Eleven"	January 26, 2015	0.6/2	1.55	—N/a	—N/a	—N/a	—N/a
12	"Chapter Twelve"	February 2, 2015	0.5/1	1.24	—N/a	—N/a	—N/a	—N/a
13	"Chapter Thirteen"	February 9, 2015	0.6/2	1.34	—N/a	—N/a	—N/a	—N/a
14	"Chapter Fourteen"	February 16, 2015	0.6/2	1.31	—N/a	—N/a	—N/a	—N/a
15	"Chapter Fifteen"	March 9, 2015	0.5/1	1.26	—N/a	—N/a	—N/a	—N/a
16	"Chapter Sixteen"	March 16, 2015	0.5/1	1.10	0.3	—N/a	0.8	—N/a
17	"Chapter Seventeen"	April 6, 2015	0.4/1	0.93	0.3	—N/a	0.7	—N/a
18	"Chapter Eighteen"	April 13, 2015	0.4/1	1.03	—N/a	—N/a	—N/a	—N/a
19	"Chapter Nineteen"	April 20, 2015	0.4/1	1.05	—N/a	—N/a	—N/a	—N/a
20	"Chapter Twenty"	April 27, 2015	0.4/1	1.06	0.3	—N/a	0.7	—N/a
21	"Chapter Twenty-One"	May 4, 2015	0.5/1	1.05	—N/a	—N/a	—N/a	—N/a
22	"Chapter Twenty-Two"	May 11, 2015	0.5/1	1.24	—N/a	—N/a	—N/a	—N/a

== Home media ==
The Complete First Season
Set details			Special features
22 episodes; 968 minutes (Region 1); 5-disc set; 1.78:1 aspect ratio; Languages: English (Dolby Digital 2.0)			Jane the Virgin: Immaculate Creation. Go behind the scenes and get a peek into the creation of the show; Getting to Know the Cast of Jane the Virgin; Gag Reel; Deleted Scenes
Release dates			Jane the Virgin: Immaculate Creation. Go behind the scenes and get a peek into the creation of the show; Getting to Know the Cast of Jane the Virgin; Gag Reel; Deleted Scenes
United States	United Kingdom	Australia	Jane the Virgin: Immaculate Creation. Go behind the scenes and get a peek into the creation of the show; Getting to Know the Cast of Jane the Virgin; Gag Reel; Deleted Scenes
September 29, 2015		March 1, 2017	Jane the Virgin: Immaculate Creation. Go behind the scenes and get a peek into the creation of the show; Getting to Know the Cast of Jane the Virgin; Gag Reel; Deleted Scenes
