= Jessica O'Toole and Amy Rardin =

American screenwriting duo

Jessica O'Toole and Amy Rardin are an American screenwriting duo. The pair have written scripts for the American Girl series, the Disney Channel Original Movie Invisible Sister, as well as television series Selfie, Greek, The Carrie Diaries, Jane the Virgin and Miss Farah. They developed and executive produced The CW's reboot of Charmed alongside Jennie Snyder Urman.
