= Francisco San Martín =

American actor (1985 – 2025)

- Born: August 27, 1985; Mallorca, Spain
- Died: January 16, 2025 (aged 39); Los Angeles, California, United States
- Occupation: Actor
- Years active: 2011–2017
- Known for: Days of Our Lives; The Bold and the Beautiful; Jane the Virgin

Francisco San Martín (August 27, 1985 – January 16, 2025) was a Spanish-born American actor.

== Early life ==
Born in Mallorca, Spain in 1985, San Martín spent much of his childhood in Montana, United States. Later, he returned to Spain during his adolescence, where he participated in several plays, worked as a model and appeared in small film productions. When he was 25, he moved and settled in Hollywood to pursue his acting career.

== Career ==
San Martín originated the role of Dario Hernandez on Days of Our Lives in 2011. In 2017, he portrayed Mateo on The Bold and the Beautiful, and Fabian Regalo del Cielo on Jane the Virgin.

== Death ==
San Martín died from suicide by hanging in Los Angeles, on January 16, 2025, at the age of 39.
