= Yael Grobglas =

French-born Israeli actress

- יעל גרובגלס
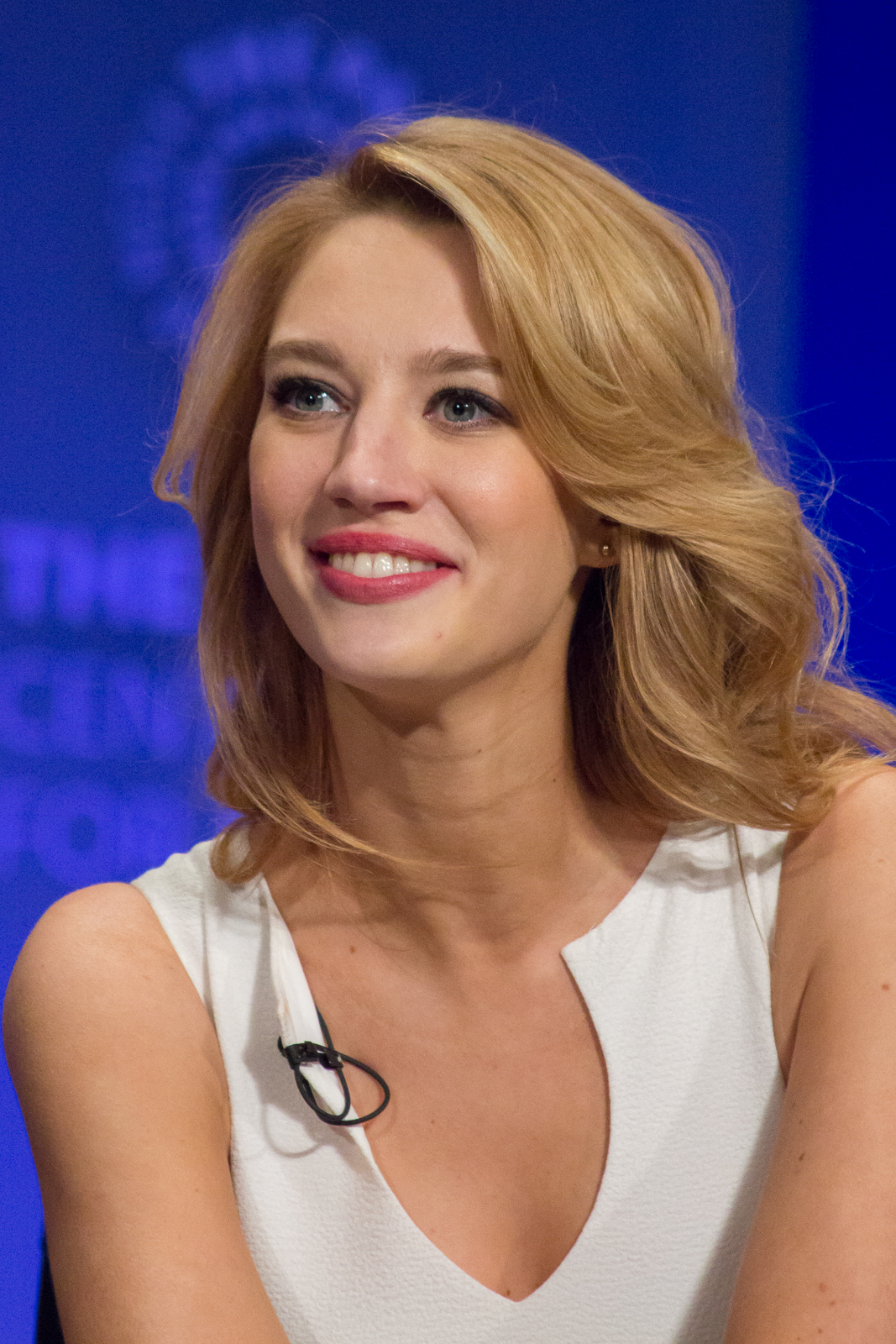
- Grobglas at the 2015 PaleyFest presentation for Jane the Virgin
- Born: 31 May 1984 (age 42); Paris, France
- Occupation: Actress
- Years active: 2004–present
- Spouse: Artem Kroupenev (m. ?–present)
- Children: 1
- Website: yaelgrobglas.com

Yael Grobglas (Hebrew: יעל גרובגלס, pronounced [jaˈʔel ˈɡʁobɡlas]; born 31 May 1984) is an Israeli actress, best known for her role as Petra Solano on The CW's television series Jane the Virgin.

She started her career in Israeli television, gaining prominence among Israeli teenagers. Between 2007 and 2012, Grobglas took on lead and supporting roles in several major Israeli TV shows. She also gained recognition for her debut film role in the first Israeli horror film Rabies (2010), which participated in the Tribeca Film Festival, and a number of other venues internationally. In 2013, Grobglas was cast for The CW's historical romantic drama series Reign as Olivia, a noblewoman who is an old flame of Prince Francis.

== Early life ==
Grobglas was born in Paris, France. Her father Jean Pierre Grobglas hails from a French-Jewish family of Ashkenazi Jewish descent. Her mother Eva (Rosner) is originally a Christian from Austria, who has converted to Judaism. Both her parents are artists. On her father's side she has relatives who died in the Holocaust. In 1986, when she was a two-year-old baby, Grobglas's family immigrated to Israel with her; and resided in the city of Ra'anana, Israel, where she grew up.

Grobglas began performing at a young age. As a teenager she studied and performed in professional dance and ballet groups. She later led a brief modelling career and participated in a number of runway shows and advertising campaigns. Eventually having realized a greater interest in acting, Grobglas graduated from the Yoram Loewenstein Performing Arts Studio in Tel Aviv, Israel.

== Career ==
In 2007, Grobglas was cast to her first major role for the Israeli sci-fi series The Island, which made her popular among Israel's young audiences. Following two consecutive seasons of the show Grobglas enrolled in a full-time three-year acting program at the Yoram Loewenstein Performing Arts Studio. She completed performing for the third season of Israeli series The Island in 2010, and was cast for a number of major commercials during the course of her acting studies.

In 2010, Grobglas gained international recognition when she starred in the first Israeli horror film Rabies (Kalevet). She was part of the main cast of the Israeli sitcom HaShualim (The Foxes). Grobglas also played the role of Linda Christie in a Beersheba Theater adaptation of Play It Again, Sam.

In 2012, Grobglas was cast to the Israeli comedy-drama series Tanuchi ("Chill").

In 2013, Grobglas starred as America Singer in the CW's The Selection pilot, described as a cross between The Bachelor and The Hunger Games, but it was ultimately not picked up to series. In the same year, she began the recurring role of Olivia D'Amencourt in the CW's series Reign.

In 2014, Grobglas was cast as Petra, one of the main characters on the CW's Jane the Virgin. When describing her experience as Petra to the New York Times, Grobglas said, "I'm usually cast for the more goofy and tomboyish characters [...] I'm having a wonderful time playing someone so complex and layered and funny." "She's calculating, resourceful and manipulative," she said. "But even though I don't agree with the decisions she makes, you have to admire her. It's been a blast playing such a mischievous character because she's so unlike me." In January 2015, Time magazine stated that "Grobglas [...] has turned Petra into one of television's most amusingly complex comic villains. Fans love to hate her, yet as Jane delves deeper into Petra's backstory – and shows off her lighter side – they're starting to love her as well."

In 2015, Grobglas starred along Yon Tumarkin and Danielle Jadelyn in JeruZalem, an English-language Israeli horror film.

In March 2016, TVLine gave Grobglas an honorable mention for her performance in Jane the Virgin Chapter 36: "Leave it to Jane the Virgin's unsung MVP Yael Grobglas to turn the painful process of giving birth – to twins, no less! – into a comedic tour de force ... After witnessing Grobglas' impeccable ability to mix humor and emotion, we can't wait to see what challenges (and laughs) motherhood will bring for her character."

In 2024, Daniel Feinberg of the Hollywood Reporter noted Yael's performance in the 2024 CBS series Matlock: "I also quite liked the one-off guest appearance by Jane the Virgin‘s Yael Grobglas. She plays a human lie detector working as a jury consultant and her return might be what it would take to get me to come back to Matlock at some point."

== Personal life ==
Grobglas is married to Israeli businessman Artem Kroupenev, her high school sweetheart. They have a home in Tel Aviv, Israel. In 2020, she gave birth to a baby girl, Arielle.

Grobglas has mentioned she has a strong passion for food, cooking and hosting dinner parties in her spare time. She avoids eating meat, and in 2012, she became a pescetarian before moving to the United States.

== Filmography ==
Year	Title	Role	Notes
2007	Maybe This Time	Toti	
2007–09	The Island	Ginny	Main Role. Hebrew title: האי (ha'iy)
2010	Rabies	Shir	Hebrew title: כלבת (Kalevet)
2010	The Foxes	Eli	
2011	Ramzor	Nufar Levy	Recurring role
2011	Split	Noy	Recurring role (season 3)
2011	Golden Girls	Lihi	
2011	Barefoot	Jane	Mini-series
2012	Chill	Gaby	
2013	The Selection	America Singer	Unsold TV pilot
2013	Savri Maranan	Amit (Adam's date)	Guest role; 2 episodes
2013–14	Reign	Olivia D'Amencourt	7 episodes
2014–19	Jane the Virgin	Petra Solano/Natalia Dvořáček	98 episodes
2014–19	Jane the Virgin	Anežka Archuletta	
2015	JeruZalem	Rachel Klein	Film, Lead role
2015	The Pajamas	Amit	Repeating her role from Savri Marnan
2016	Grace Note	Thea	Short film
2016	Crazy Ex-Girlfriend	Trina	Episode: "When Will Josh and His Friend Leave Me Alone?"
2017–18	Supergirl	Gayle Marsh / Psi	2 episodes (season 3)
2018	An Interview with God	Sarah Asher	Film
2019	Hell's Kitchen	Herself	Reality series; Guest diner; Episode: "The Grand Finale"
2022	Undone	Leeba	Episode: "Rectify"
2022	Hanukkah on Rye	Molly	Television film
2024–26	Matlock	Shae Banfield	11 episodes
2025	S.W.A.T.	Heather	3 episodes
2026	Jerusalem '67	Sarah	Film
2026	NCIS	Rebecca Lee	Guest star

=== Stage ===
Year	Title	Role	Notes
2012	Play It Again, Sam	Linda	Beersheba Theater

=== Music video ===
Year	Title	Artist	Role	Notes
2011	"Say You Like Me"	We the Kings	The Girl	
