= Andrea Navedo =

American actress (born 1970)

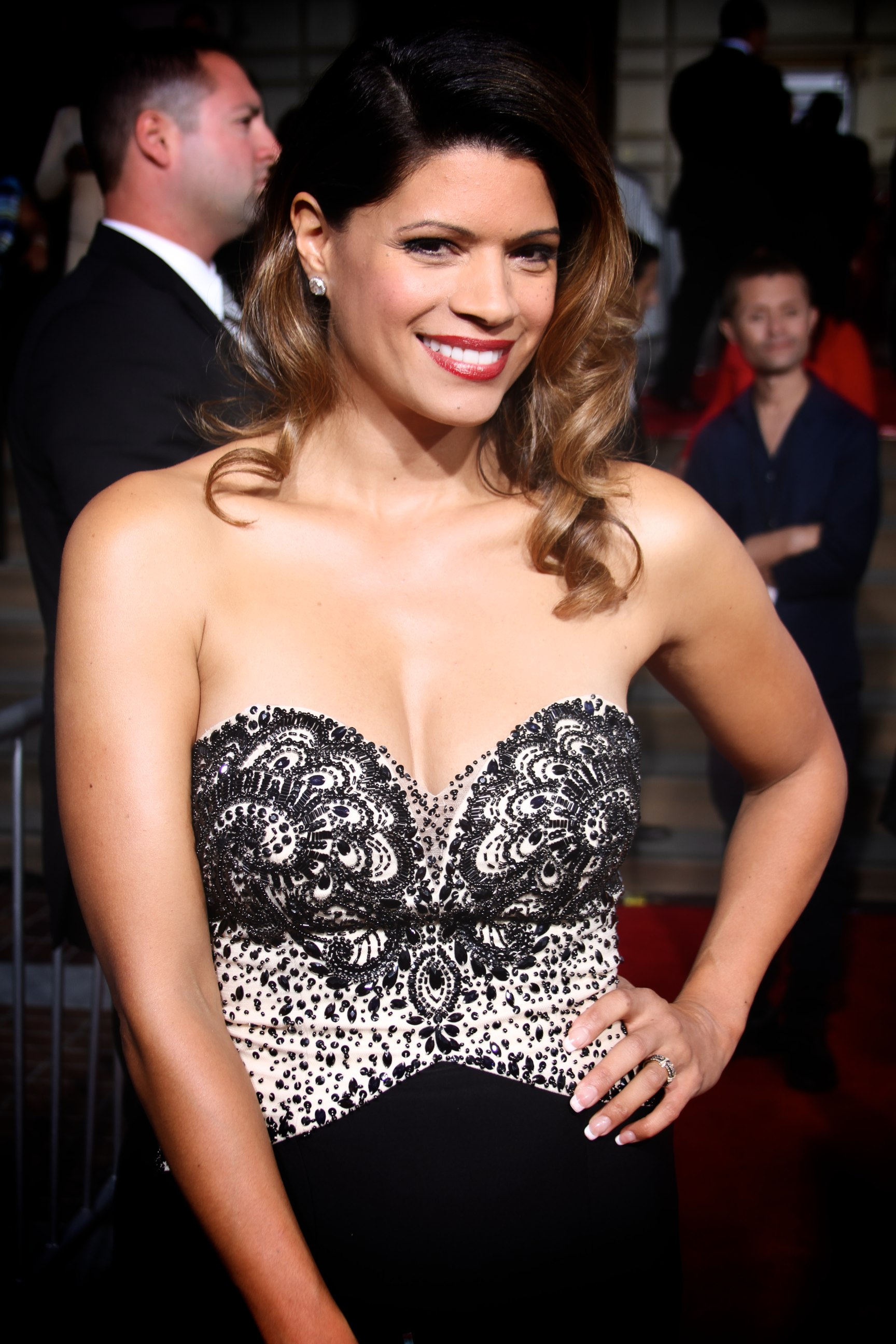
- Navedo at the 2014 Alma Awards
- Born: 1970 (age 56); The Bronx, New York City, U.S.
- Education: State University of New York at Old Westbury (BA)
- Occupation: Actress
- Years active: 1995–present
- Spouse: ?? (m. 2000; div. 2020)
- Children: 2

Andrea Navedo (born 1970) is an American actress. She began her career on the daytime soap operas One Life to Live (1995–1997) and Guiding Light (1999–2000), and in later years had several supporting roles on primetime television. From 2014 to 2019, Navedo starred as Xiomara "Xo" Villanueva in The CW comedy-drama series, Jane the Virgin.

== Early life ==
A second-generation New York Puerto Rican, Navedo grew up in New York City. She said she relates to her Jane the Virgin character because her mother was also a young single mother. Navedo graduated from DeWitt Clinton High School in 1988 and graduated from the State University of New York at Old Westbury in 1998 with a B.A. in Communicative and Creative Arts with a concentration in theater. Navedo was also featured in a DeWitt Clinton notable alumni article alongside other famous alumni such as Stan Lee.

== Career ==
Navedo began her professional acting career on the daytime soap operas. From 1995 to 1997, she played the role of Linda Soto in the ABC soap opera, One Life to Live. In 1999, she joined the cast of CBS soap opera Guiding Light as Theresa Sandoval. She made her film debut with small part in Girl 6 (1996), and later guest starred in episodes of New York Undercover and The District. In 2001, Navedo co-starred in the action comedy film, Double Take and the following year in the drama film Washington Heights.

From 2001 to 2004, Navedo had a recurring role on the NBC legal crime series, Law & Order, as Detective Ana Cordova. later guest-starred on Law & Order: Criminal Intent, Damages and Blue Bloods. Navedo also has appeared in the number of films such as El Cantante and Remember Me. From 2011 to 2013, Navedo also had the recurring roles on How to Make It in America, Golden Boy and Law & Order: Special Victims Unit. She starred in the comedy film Superfast!, the parody of The Fast and the Furious film series, which was released in 2015.

In 2014, Navedo was cast in the series regular role of Xiomara "Xo" Villanueva, title character's mother (played by Gina Rodriguez) in The CW critically acclaimed comedy-drama series, Jane the Virgin. She received the 2015 Imagen Award for Best Supporting Actress – Television for her performance. The series ended in 2019 after five seasons. In 2017, she appeared in the fantasy crime film Bright starring Will Smith. In 2020, she was cast as civil rights activist Carmen Delgado Votaw in the Hulu miniseries Mrs. America.

== Personal life ==
Navedo met her husband in 1997 and married in 2000; they have two children together, a daughter when Navedo was 35, and a son when she was 37, before they divorced in 2020.

== Filmography ==
=== Film ===
Year	Title	Role	Notes
1996	Girl 6	Phone Girl	
2001	Double Take	Maque Sanchez	
2002	Washington Heights	Maggie	
2006	El Cantante	Zaida	
2010	Remember Me	Caroline's Teacher	
2013	Stereotypically Me	Lydia Maldonado	Short film
2014	Once Upon a Time in Queens	Anna Vasco	
2015	Superfast!	Michelle	
2017	Bright	Captain Perez	
2018	Love Spoken		Also director and producer
2021	Before I Go		a.k.a. God the Worm
2022	Smile or Hug	Irene	
2022	The Royal		
2023	Spider-Man: Across the Spider-Verse	Additional voices	Voice role
2023	Miguel Wants to Fight	Lydia	
2024	Girl Haunts Boy	Catarina	

=== Television ===
Year	Title	Role	Notes
1995–1997	One Life to Live	Linda Soto	Series regular
1997	New York Undercover	Clerk	Episode: "Is It a Crime?"
1999–2000	Guiding Light	Theresa Sandoval	Series regular
2000	The District	Debbie	Episode: "Pilot"
2002	Porn 'n Chicken	Lucy Sanchez	Television film
2001–2004	Law & Order	Detective Ana Cordova	Recurring role (Seasons 12–14)
2008	Law & Order: Criminal Intent	Adele	Episode: "Vanishing Act"
2009	Damages	Gabriella	Episode: "New York Sucks"
2010, 2011	Blue Bloods	Lydia Gonsalves, Yolanda Gonsalves	2 episodes (1 as each character)
2011	How to Make It in America	Debbie Dominguez	Recurring role (Season 2)
2012	White Collar	Doctor	Episode: "Most Wanted"
2013	Golden Boy	Lorraine Arroyo	Recurring role
2013	Law & Order: Special Victims Unit	Cynthia Mancheno	3 episodes
2014	The Leftovers	Field Hockey Coach	Episode: "Pilot"
2014–2019	Jane the Virgin	Xiomara "Xo" Villanueva	Main cast Imagen Award for Best Supporting Actress – Television (2015)
2016–2018	Trollhunters: Tales of Arcadia	Ophilia Nuñez (voice)	Recurring voice role
2017–2020	Elena of Avalor	Queen Lucia (voice)	4 episodes, voice role
2020	The Good Fight	Marta Tecades	2 episodes
2020	Mrs. America	Carmen Delgado Votaw	2 episodes
2021	Leverage: Redemption	Maria Shipp	Recurring role (Season 1)
2021–2023	A Million Little Things	Valerie Sandoval	Recurring role (Season 4), 1 episode (Season 5)

== Awards and nominations ==
Year	Awards	Category	Film/TV	Result
1997	One Life to Live	Soap Opera Digest Awards	Outstanding Younger Lead Actress	Nominated
2015	Imagen Award	Imagen Award for Best Supporting Actress – Television	Jane the Virgin	Won
2015	Hola Award	Breakthrough Performance	Jane the Virgin	Won
2016	Imagen Award	Imagen Award for Best Supporting Actress – Television	Jane the Virgin	Nominated
2016	Impact Awards	Outstanding Performance In A Television Series	Jane the Virgin	Won
2019	Westfield International Film Festival	Woman in Film Award		Won
