= Jennie Snyder Urman =

American television producer (born 1975)

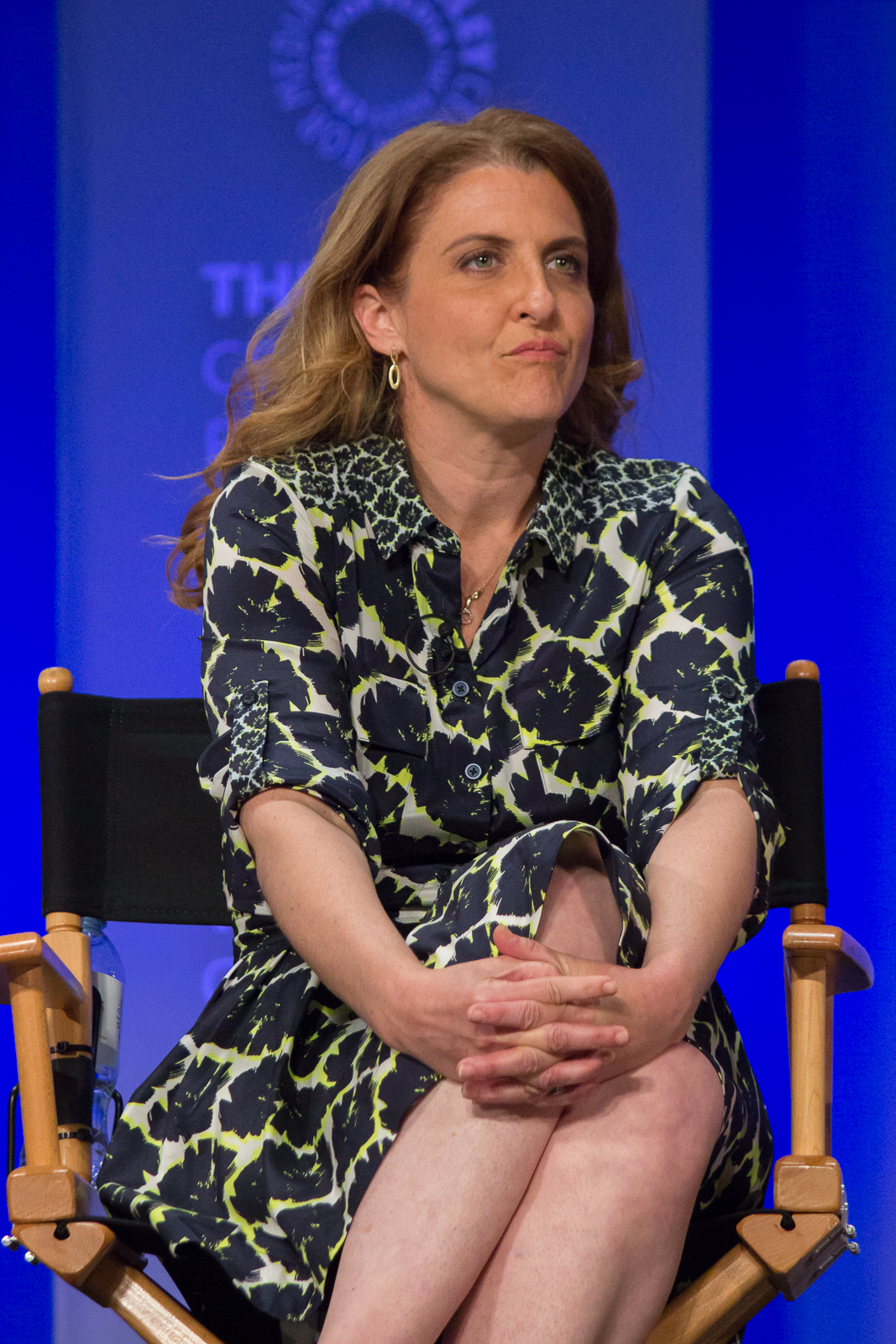
- Urman in 2015
- Born: June 6, 1975 (age 51)
- Occupations: Writer, producer
- Years active: 2003–present
- Spouse: Jamie Urman
- Children: 2

Jennie Snyder Urman (born June 6, 1975) is an American television screenwriter and producer.

Urman has been involved in the production of several television programs including: Hope & Faith, Gilmore Girls, Men in Trees, Lipstick Jungle, 90210, Emily Owens, M.D., Reign, Jane the Virgin, Charmed, and Matlock.

== Career ==
Urman worked initially as a waitress in New York City while she looked for acting opportunities. Eventually she gave up her acting ambition, saying she was not "thick-skinned enough or perhaps talented enough or wanted it enough as a career" to be on screen. Profiling Urman for Variety, Bob Verini stated, that Urman "like many tyros, initially found it hard to stop defining herself by her day job"; she was told "to stop waitressing. This is a job." On September 10, 2001, Urman and her friend, Victoria Webster, left New York City for Los Angeles to pursue a career writing for television.

Urman got her start in television writing in 2003, working as a staff writer on the ABC comedy Hope & Faith. She worked with the show for three years, first as a writer, then as a story editor, and finally, the executive story editor. In an interview with the Alumni of Princeton, Urman explained, "[the] ladder you climb when you're a TV writer [...] You start as a staff writer and go through each level until you become an executive producer."

In 2012, Urman was named one of Variety's "10 TV Writers to Watch". In 2014, she signed a deal with CBS.

== Television ==
Year (s)	Television Program	Title
2003–2004; 2004–2005; 2005–2006	Hope & Faith	Staff writer Story editor Executive story editor
2006–2007	Gilmore Girls	Co-producer
2007–2008	Men in Trees	Producer
2008–2009	Lipstick Jungle	Supervising producer
2009; 2009–2011	90210	Supervising producer Co-executive producer
2012–2013	Emily Owens, M.D.	Creator, executive producer, writer
2013–2014	Reign	Consulting producer, writer
2014–2019	Jane the Virgin	Developer, executive producer, writer
2018–2022	Charmed	Developer, executive producer, writer
2020	Broke	Executive producer, writer
2022	Good Sam	Executive producer
2024–present	Matlock	Developer, executive producer, writer

=== Jane the Virgin ===
Urman's show Jane the Virgin first aired in 2014. The show was inspired and adapted from Perla Farías' Venezuelan telenovela Juana la virgen, with a log line that reads "a girl gets artificially inseminated." When initially introduced to the inspiration behind Jane the Virgin, Urman thought, "I don't know about that. That sounds too crazy for me." Urman served as executive producer, showrunner, and writer for the series.

== Filmography ==
=== Something Borrowed (2011) ===
Something Borrowed (2011) was Urman's first project writing for film, based on Emily Giffin's novel of the same name. Critic A. O. Scott, reviewing Urman's script in Luke Greenfield's Something Borrowed for The New York Times, described the film as "a well-meaning comedy of marriage that seems ardently committed to the blandness of its characters." Urman received criticism for the dialogue in particular. Scott criticized not only the characterization, but also the diction, quoting from the film.

== Personal life ==
Urman is Jewish., and grew up in Rye, New York.

Urman graduated from Princeton University in 1999 with a BA in English and a Certificate from the Program in Theater. She is married to Jamie Urman, a cinematographer, with whom she has two children.

Urman has said she is often questioned about her "work-life balance…[which] strikes me as sort of funny, because it's not something that often gets asked of men in this business. It's been a balancing act, and I feel lucky that I found a true partner in my husband. We support each other in all aspects of life, so when my work-life balance gets out of whack, he steps up and takes off of work to be home with the kids, something I'm really grateful for."

== Sources ==
- Stilson, Janet. "Woman on the Verge: Fresh off her Golden Globe win, Gina Rodriguez, Star of the CW's Jane the Virgin, talks about a Comedy that's hit a Cultural Nerve not only here but also in 170 Markets Worldwide." ADWEEK. March 23, 2015. Accessed September 18, 2015.
- Verini, Bob. "Jennie Snyder Urman: 'Emily Owens, M.D' a prescription for CW success." Daily Variety 7 June 2012: 14. Academic OneFile. Web. 30 Sept. 2015.
- Walsten, Jessika. "Virgin an immaculate conception for EP: Urman's embrace of out-there story, complex characters helps fast-track series." Broadcasting & Cable 23 Mar. 2015: 26. Academic OneFile. Web. 30 Sept. 2015.
- CWTV PR bio
