= Eric Wu (businessman) =

Chinese-American tech entrepreneur

- Born: c. 1983 (age 42–43)
- Education: University of Arizona (BA)
- Occupations: Investor and entrepreneur
- Known for: Co-founder of Opendoor

Eric Wu is an American investor and entrepreneur. Since 2008, Wu has founded several companies having to do with real estate, such as RentAdvisor and Movity; in 2014, he co-founded Opendoor, an iBuyer company, and served as its CEO until 2024. He has also invested in dozens of companies such as Airtable and Roofstock.

At the age of 37, Wu was named to Fortune's 40 under 40. In 2022, he was the third youngest CEO on the Fortune 500 at the age of 39. Business Insider named him a top 60 angel investor and a top 100 early-stage seed investor. In 2024, Wu was listed in the Angels' Share 100, "an exclusive list of the most active angel investors in the most promising startups in enterprise tech."

== Early life and education ==
Wu grew up in Glendale, Arizona as the son of Taiwanese immigrants. His father died when he was four. At the time, his mother worked as a social worker.

While studying economics at the University of Arizona, at the age of 19, Wu bought his first house, around 1,600 square feet, for around $100,000 using his college scholarship money. He then turned its garage into two studio apartments and rented them out. Eventually, he amassed around 25 houses by the time he graduated college in 2005. Wu also learned how to program and build websites while in college—skills which he would combine with his real estate experience with his companies later on.

After graduating, Wu moved to San Francisco.

== Career ==
=== Startups ===
In 2008, Wu co-founded RentAdvisor, a company that reviewed rentals. The idea for the company had come to Wu following difficulties he faced during his move to San Francisco. RentAdvisor raised around $7 million before getting acquired by Apartment List in 2013.

In 2010, Wu co-founded Movity, a real estate website that collected and analyzed neighborhood data. That same year, it was accepted to Y Combinator. It was acquired by Trulia one year later. Wu then worked at Trulia for two years. Around then, fellow Y Combinator peer Keith Rabois raised the idea of Opendoor to Wu, though it would take Wu a few more years to eventually sign on.

=== OpenDoor ===
In 2014, Wu co-founded Opendoor with Ian Wong and Rabois in 2014. Shortly after, the San Francisco-based company had a Series A funding round of $10 million led by Khosla Ventures. In 2017, Opendoor was called a "fat start-up" by The New York Times. By then, it had raised over $300 million, with investors like SoftBank, and was spending upwards of $100 million a month to buy properties. By March 2019, it had a $3.5 billion pre-money valuation and raised around $1.3 billion in equity funding, as well as around $3 billion in debt financing for home purchases.

After raising billions of dollars in funding, Opendoor went public in 2020 in a merger with Social Capital Hedosophia Holdings II. Opendoor's IPO made Wu, with a 6% stake, into a billionaire.

Wu served as the CEO of Opendoor up until 2022, after which he stepped down to serve as the president of marketplace until 2023. In the latter role, he oversaw the company's Exclusives Marketplace, a platform where users can directly buy and sell homes. (Carrie Wheeler, who was formerly Opendoor's chief financial officer, assumed Wu's position as CEO after 2022.)

On December 14, 2023, Wu announced that he would be stepping down from the company, although he has remained an advisor to the company and its board. He specifically stated: "After ten years, I am called to get back to my startup roots and create and build again. I'm humbled by this accomplishment and grateful for all my teammates who helped shape the product, culture, and company." News of Wu's departure was followed by a drop of over 10% in Opendoor stock. His resignation was effective January 1, 2024.

=== Investing ===
Throughout his career, Wu has invested in several companies such as Airtable, Roofstock, Echo Chunk, and others.
