= Affinity Partners =

American investment firm

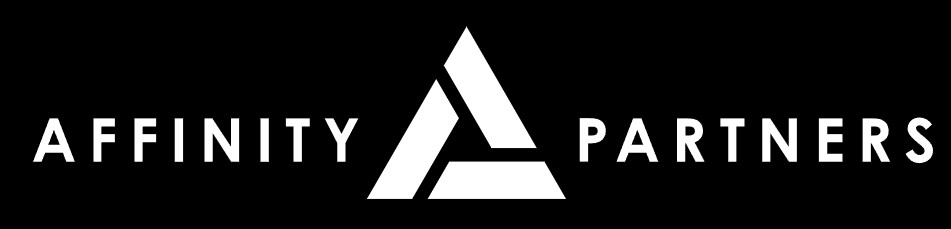
- Type: Private
- Industry: Investment management
- Founded: July 1, 2021 (5 years ago) in Miami, Florida, U.S.
- Founder: Jared Kushner
- Headquarters: Miami, Florida, U.S.
- Key people: Jared Kushner, Bret Pearlman and Asad Naqvi
- Products: Investment fund
- AUM: ▲$5.4 billion (2025)
- Owner: Jared Kushner
- Number of employees: 20 (2021)
- Website: affinitypartners.com

Affinity Partners is an American investment firm based in Miami, Florida. It was formed in 2021 by Jared Kushner, Donald Trump's son-in-law, who also served as a senior advisor during Trump's first presidency. It serves as a private investment that legally is not subject "to the same anti-money laundering and beneficial ownership reporting requirements of other financial institutions" hence being excluded by the definition of investment company set under the Investment Company Act of 1940. The firm has a focus on investing in American and Israeli companies. Its sources of funding are overwhelmingly from the Saudi Arabian government.

Kushner's firm received commitments of more than $3 billion by the end of 2021 to invest in American and Israeli companies that are expanding in India, Africa, the Middle East, and other parts of Asia. The largest investor by some margin is the Saudi government's sovereign wealth fund, the Public Investment Fund, which has allocated $2 billion to the firm. Officials who headed the Public Investment Fund objected to investing in Kushner's firm, but Saudi ruler Mohammed bin Salman overruled those officials.

The firm is fully owned by Jared Kushner and has a staff of approximately 20 people. By 2024, the firm had returned no profits to its investors. The firm has been controversial due to conflicts of interest arising from Kushner soliciting funds from Middle Eastern governments while also working as an envoy having direct and indirect dealings with those governments in his role in the second Trump administration. According to reporting by Bloomberg News, investors in the firm do so with the expectation of influencing the Trump administration.

== History ==
=== Capitalization and investors ===
Kushner sought funds for the new company from the sovereign wealth funds of Gulf countries. Those funds provided the vast bulk of funds actually secured by Affinity, with only minor stakes contributed by US nationals. By far the biggest investor was the Saudi government's Public Investment Fund, which invested $2 billion in Kushner's firm, six months after Kushner left the White House. Kushner has stated that he hopes to open an "investment corridor between Saudi Arabia and Israel", seen internationally as a "sign of warming ties between two historic rivals".

The firm still primarily depends on Saudi money. As of April 2022, it had $2.5 billion in assets under management.

In a May 2022 interview with The Wall Street Journal, Kushner said: "If we can get Israelis and Muslims in the region to do business together, it will focus people on shared interests and shared values." He added, "we kicked off historic regional change which needs to be reinforced and nurtured to achieve its potential."

=== Investment portfolio ===
The fund has invested in two undisclosed Israeli hi-tech companies The Wall Street Journal reported that "it is the first known instance that the Saudi Public Investment Fund's cash will be directed to Israel, a sign of the kingdom's increasing willingness to do business with the country."

In March 2022, Affinity executives heard pitches from 13 to 15 Israeli startups.

In July 2023, it was announced that Affinity was the primary backer in Munich-based fitness-technology company EGYM's £225 million Series F funding round. The investment was Affinity's first European investment.

The fund secured 1.5 billion in funding from the Qatar Investment Authority and Lunate Investment firm on 2024, thus making its assets to the tune of 4.8 billion.

In March 2024, Affinity began advanced discussions with Aman Resorts to build Sazan Island Resort, an eco-resort community off the coast of Albania.

In November 2024, Forbes reported that Affinity "helped boost Kushner's net worth to at least $900 million, up 180% from early 2017, when he became senior advisor to Trump."

In September 2025, Forbes reported that Affinity Partners incubated Brain Co. with prolific solo investor Elad Gil. Additional co-founders include Luis Videgaray, the former Mexican foreign minister, and Opendoor's Eric Wu. Brain Co. is a San Francisco-based startup that aims to help large businesses and governments apply AI to their operations.

In September 2025, Affinity, alongside Silver Lake and the Saudi Public Investment Fund, began the process of acquiring video game company Electronic Arts in the largest leveraged buyout on record valued at $52.5 billion, taking the company into private ownership. Affinity holds a 1.1% share of ownership, with the PIF owning 93.4% and Silver Lake 5.5%.

In December 2025, Affinity joined sovereign wealth firms for Saudi Arabia, Qatar and Abu Dhabi in backing a proposed acquisition of Warner Bros. Discovery. The same month, Affinity withdrew.

On April 17, 2026, an investigation led by Democratic congressman Jamie Raskin reported that Affinity Partners has amassed $6.16 billion in assets, including $1.2 billion from 2025 alone.

== Foreign influence and US policy ==
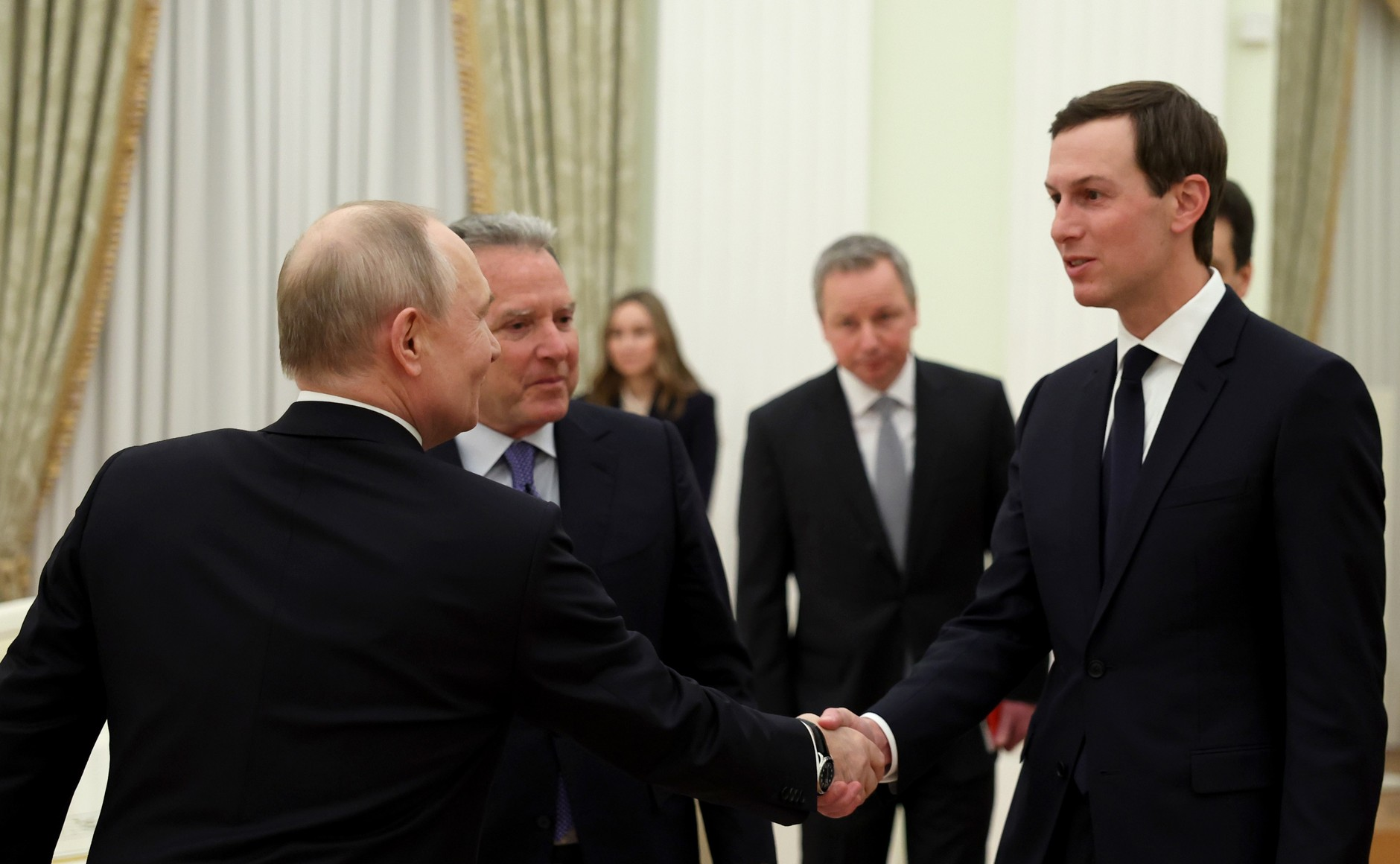
Jared Kushner and Steve Witkoff at the Kremlin in January 2026

According to ethics experts, the 2021 investment from Saudi crown prince, Mohammed bin Salman, created the appearance of potential payback for Kushner, given that he had been a staunch defender of the Saudi royal while at the White House. The House Oversight Committee said on June 2, 2022, that it had opened an investigation into whether Kushner had traded on his government position to get the deal.

Between 2021 and 2024, the fund had collected approximately $157 million in management fees from foreign investors while generating no return on investment for its clientele; this included $87 million in payments directly from the Saudi government. The fund is under Senate investigation for possible foreign influence buying ahead of the 2024 election after a New York Times report suggested that Kushner used contacts he made from his role in Trump's White House. According to Reuters, Kushner has also been in multiple discussions on U.S.–Saudi diplomacy since Trump left office, which in turn prompted questions as to whether and how his financial ties would influence U.S. foreign policy under a second Trump presidency.

After Donald Trump won the 2024 United States presidential election, Jared Kushner said in December 2024 that he had raised new funds only before the election and gave assurances that he would not solicit additional money during Trump's second term. He also said in February 2024 that he would not join a future Trump administration. Kushner backtracked from those promises and acted as a negotiator for the Trump administration and, according to New York Times research, acquired fresh Affinity Partners investments from foreign governments.

=== CNN report and investigation ===
In September 2026, CNN published a report highlighting Affinity Partners' investment in Israeli insurance company Phoenix Financial, which invests in Israeli arms manufacturers, including Elbit Systems. The report cited ethics concerns regarding Kushner's simultaneous investment in Phoenix and participation as an unofficial negotiator for the Gaza peace plan.

Following the report, Representative Robert Garcia announced an investigation into Affinity Partners, sending the company a letter stating Democrats on the committee were "investigating the unprecedented and dangerous ways in which President Trump and his family have profited directly from their access to power."
