= Sleeping with the Fishes =

- Directed by: Nicole Gomez Fisher
- Written by: Nicole Gomez Fisher
- Produced by: Courtney Andrialis; Matt Ott; Nicole Gomez Fisher
- Starring: Priscilla Lopez; Gina Rodriguez; Ana Ortiz
- Cinematography: Raoul Germain
- Edited by: Carlos Berrios
- Music by: Max Sitka
- Distributed by: Breaking Glass Pictures
- Release dates: June 1, 2013 (Brooklyn Film Festival); January 3, 2014 (United States)
- Running time: 95 minutes
- Country: United States
- Language: English

Sleeping with the Fishes is a 2013 romantic comedy film written and directed by Nicole Gomez Fisher. It stars Gina Rodriguez, Ana Ortiz and Priscilla Lopez. The film is loosely based on Fisher’s upbringing as part of a Jewish Latino household. The film premiered on June 1, 2013 at the Brooklyn Film Festival, where it won the award for Best New Director. It was later picked up by Broken Glass Pictures, who gave the film a limited release on January 3, 2014.

== Plot ==
Alexis "Lexi" Fish lives in Los Angeles and works as a mascot and occasional phone sex operator, struggling to get by after the death of her husband. After an estranged aunt dies, she returns to New York to attend her funeral. While there, she butts heads with her overly critical mother, Estella. Meanwhile, her well-meaning older sister Kayla arranges a last-minute job for Lexi to plan the Bat Mitzvah party for the daughter of one of their acquaintances, Mrs. Wasserstein.

Lexi also encounters the handsome Dominic, who runs a club and has a young son. She reveals to him that while she and her husband were high school sweethearts with outwardly successful lives, he repeatedly cheated on her during their marriage and left her with debt after his death.

Despite her initial reluctance to plan the Bat Mitzvah party, Lexi is eventually able to throw it together, confronting the overbearing Mrs. Wasserstein in the process and also gaining the courage to reveal her husband's flaws to her mother.

== Cast ==
- Gina Rodriguez as Alexis Fish
- Ana Ortiz as Kayla Fish
- Steven Strait as Dominic Sebastiani
- Priscilla Lopez as Estella Fish
- Melissa Navia as Casey
- Taylor Black as Summer (as Taylor Gildersleeve)
- Michael Sirow as Daniel
- Orfeh as Mrs. Wasserstein
- Tibor Feldman as Dr. Leonard Fish

== Production ==
Director Nicole Gomez Fisher was originally reluctant to direct but came on board after being unable to find anyone else to direct her script.

Gina Rodriguez was offered the lead role after Fisher saw her in Filly Brown.

== Reception ==
Richard Propes of The Independent Critic wrote, "The film's greatest value may very well be the remarkable chemistry displayed between Rodriguez and Ortiz, whose performances are so radiating of that sibling sensibility that it's hard not to wonder if they really are siblings. Rodriguez adds the film's emotional resonance, while Ortiz gives the film a delightful spark and energy - together they are an absolute delight."

=== Awards and nominations ===
The film was nominated for five Imagen Awards, including Best Picture, Best Director and Best Actress and Supporting Actress for Gina Rodriguez, Ana Ortiz and Priscilla Lopez. Fisher won the award for Best New Director at the Brooklyn Film Festival.
