= Tess Romero =

American actress

- Born: March 8, 2006 (age 20)
- Occupation: Actress
- Years active: 2017–present

Tess Romero is an American actress. She is best known for playing the lead role of Elena in the comedy drama series Diary of a Future President.

== Early life ==
Romero was a dancer at the Advanced Theatre Development Workshop for 12 years. She attended Yale University.

== Career ==
Romero started off her career by appearing in shows such as the crime drama series Blindspot and the comedy series Alternatino with Arturo Castro. She made her film debut playing young Fausta in the science fiction film Anya. Her first big role was playing the lead character Elena Canero-Reed in the Disney+ comedy drama series Diary of a Future President. She is set to feature in the fantasy film Jilliahsmen Trinity: 2.0 - R.O.Y.G.B.I.V and its sequel Jilliahsmen Trinity: 2.9 - A.R.M.

== Personal life ==
Her favourite show growing up was The Fresh Beat Band which inspired her to become an actress. Her favourite actresses are Saoirse Ronan, Zendaya and Frances McDormand.

== Filmography ==
=== Film ===
Year	Title	Role	Notes
2019	Anya (2019 film)	Young Fausta	
2026	Jilliahsmen Trinity: 2.0 - R.O.Y.G.B.I.V	Unknown	
2027	Jilliahsmen Trinity: 2.9 - A.R.M	Unknown	

=== Television ===
Year	Title	Role	Notes
2017	Blindpsot	Pog Kid#1	Episode; Gunplay Ricochet
2019	Alternatino with Arturo Castro	Girl	Episode; The Gift
2020-2021	Diary of a Future President	Elena Canero-Reed	20 episodes
2026	Such Is Life	Young Erika	Miniseries
