= Zumper.com =

American online rental marketplace

Zumper
- Type: Private
- Industry: Real estate technology
- Founded: 2012; 14 years ago
- Founders: Anthemos Georgiades, Taylor Glass-Moore, Russell Middleton, Leah Jones
- Headquarters: San Francisco, California, United States
- Area served: United States and Canada
- Key people: Shawn Mullahy (CEO); Anthemos Georgiades (Chairman)

Zumper is an American online rental marketplace that provides apartment and housing listings in the United States and Canada. Founded in 2012, the company operates rental platforms, including PadMapper, which it acquired in 2016. The company was launched at TechCrunch Disrupt in San Francisco by Anthemos Georgiades, Russell Middleton, Taylor Glass-Moore, and Leah Jones. By 2018, Zumper hosted around one million rental listings and attracted approximately eight million monthly visitors.

== History ==
Zumper was founded after Anthemos Georgiades experienced difficulties finding rental housing while studying at Harvard Business School.

The company acquired PadMapper, a map-based rental search platform, in 2016. Prior to the acquisition, PadMapper had been involved in a legal dispute with Craigslist over the scraping of rental listings, which was settled in 2015.

In November 2017, Facebook Marketplace integrated rental listings from Zumper and Apartment List into its housing section. The partnership was later discontinued.

The company raised additional venture funding in 2018 and 2020, including rounds led by Axel Springer and E.ventures.

In 2021, the New York State Division of Human Rights announced the resolution of a source-of-income discrimination complaint against Zumper and PadMapper. The agency stated that a filter on the companies' websites affected rental listings shown to prospective tenants using Section 8 vouchers in parts of New York. The companies removed the filter, agreed to change certain practices, and paid civil fines.

In June 2022, Zumper laid off approximately 15 percent of its staff, with most cuts affecting the sales and customer service departments. Later that year, the company launched a short-term rental product and raised additional funding as an extension to its Series D round.

In 2026, chief revenue officer Shawn Mullahy was appointed chief executive officer, succeeding co-founder Anthemos Georgiades, who became chairman of the board.

== Operations ==
The platform allows users to search residential rental listings, submit rental applications, and communicate with property managers online. The company also publishes rental market data and reports that have been cited by news media and public institutions.
