= Open Listings =

Online real estate brokerage

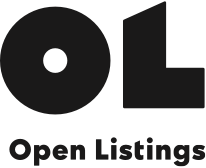
- Type: Private
- Industry: Real estate
- Founded: March 2014
- Founders: Judd Schoenholtz CEO, Alex Farrill CTO, Peter Sugihara CPO
- Defunct: 2019
- Fate: Acquired and closed
- Successor: Opendoor
- Headquarters: Los Angeles, CA, United States
- Area served: California, Texas, Washington, Illinois
- Key people: Beatrice de Jong, Elliot Hursh, Stuart Law, Monica Kogler, Angeline Vuong, Tony Andrade
- Number of employees: 45
- Website: www.openlistings.com

Open Listings was an online real estate brokerage, focused exclusively on representing buyers. One of the stated goals of the company was to make homeownership more affordable for everyone by refunding 50% of their commission to the buyer at close, saving buyers an average of $9,604 with their 50% commission refund.

== History ==
Founded in May 2014, Open Listings officially launched in February 2015 while participating in the Y Combinator Winter 2015 batch.

The company raised a $1M seed round from Soma Capital, ChinaRock Capital, I/O Ventures, Joe Montana & Liquid2 Ventures, Kevin Hale, Josh Guttman, Kevin Moore, and other angels. After its launch Open Listings raised seed and series-A rounds with investors such as Matrix Partners, Initialized Capital, & Arena Ventures.

The company was headquartered in Los Angeles, and was operational throughout California. As of mid-2018 Open Listings had 45 full-time employees, and over 150 local real estate agents.

As of September 2016, Open Listings had refunded homebuyers over $1M.

Open Listings had exceeded $1B in homes bought on its platform, resulting in over $8M in savings passed along to its customers.

=== Acquisition and Closure ===
Opendoor, the online real estate marketplace, announced in 2018 that it had acquired Open Listings.

As of June 2021, openlistings.com redirects to https://goodbye-ol.opendoor.com with an epitaph message (OL 2015–2019) thanking visitors for their support and directing them to opendoor.com/homes.
