= List of digital therapeutics companies =

This is a list of companies in digital therapeutics, a healthcare discipline that utilizes digital and Internet-based health technologies to make behavioral and lifestyle changes in patients. Digital therapeutics is a relatively new discipline that uses digital implements like mobile devices, apps, sensors, the Internet of Things, and others to spur behavioral changes in patients. The methodology operates as both a preventative technique for at-risk patients and a treatment for patients with existing conditions. The companies in this list are organized by the health conditions or functions on which they focus.

== Companies ==
=== Diabetes, obesity, and heart disease ===
- Click Therapeutics has an FDA cleared product, AspyreRx™, a prescription digital therapeutic intended to provide cognitive behavioral therapy to patients 18 years or older with type 2 diabetes
- Glooko produces a software for diabetes patients that also uses Internet-connected insulin pumps and blood glucose meters to collect data.
- Omada Health produces a program called "Prevent" that provides patients with health coaching, support groups, and education for preventing type 2 diabetes, heart disease, and obesity.

=== Fitness ===
- MyFitnessPal

=== Digital Physical Therapy ===
- Sword Health
