= Sword Health =

Digital AI healthcare company

- Type: Private
- Industry: Digital health
- Founded: 2015
- Founders: Virgílio Bento; Márcio Colunas; Fernando Correia; André Eiras
- Key people: Virgílio Bento (CEO); Márcio Colunas (CSO); Vijay Yanamadala (CMO); Jorge Meireles (CTO); Elizabeth Stevens (CLO)
- Number of employees: 650
- Website: sword.com

Sword Health is a digital health company that develops physical therapy programs for musculoskeletal (MSK) conditions, pelvic health, and injury prevention. The company was founded in 2015 in Portugal by Virgílio Bento and Márcio Colunas. Its services include digital physical therapy with artificial intelligence (AI) integrated into the care model. As of 2024, Sword Health operates internationally, with offices in the United States, Ireland, and Portugal. The company has been valued at $3 billion as of its latest funding round.

== History ==
=== Founding and early development (2015–2019) ===
Sword Health was founded in 2015 in Portugal by biomedical engineer Virgílio Bento and Márcio Colunas. The company initially developed digital rehabilitation tools that used wearable motion sensors and artificial intelligence (AI) to support physical therapy.

In 2016, Sword Health introduced a prototype system combining wearable motion sensors with an AI-driven digital therapy platform. In 2017, it conducted a feasibility study to evaluate the use of AI-assisted rehabilitation for motor task performance. By 2018, Sword Health had launched pilot programs outside Portugal and secured funding to expand operations, including the establishment of a U.S. office.

In 2019, Sword Health received recognition at the UCSF Digital Health Awards in the Employer Wellness & Prevention category for its digital MSK (musculoskeletal) therapy solution.

=== Company expansion (2020–2022) ===
Between 2020 and 2022, Sword Health introduced new product offerings and expanded its operations internationally. In 2020, the company raised $9 million in Series A funding to develop its AI-driven therapy platform and expand its clinical team. In 2021, it completed Series C and Series D funding rounds, raising $163 million and reaching a valuation of $2 billion.

During this period, Sword Health developed a program to assess patient risk for surgery and offer non-surgical treatment options. It also partnered with employers and health plans to integrate its digital therapy programs into workplace health benefits and insurance networks.

=== New programs and technologies (2022–2024) ===
Between 2022 and 2024, Sword Health introduced additional digital therapy programs addressing pelvic health, injury prevention, and surgery risk assessment. Thrive remained a key component of Sword Health’s musculoskeletal therapy offerings, while Move was developed for injury prevention and movement health.

In March 2022, Sword Health launched Bloom, a digital therapy program for pelvic health designed to support conditions such as postpartum recovery and pelvic floor dysfunction. In May 2023, the company introduced Predict, an AI-based tool intended to assess patient risk for musculoskeletal surgeries and identify non-surgical care options. Later in the year, it published early research on the clinical effectiveness of AI-assisted digital therapy, including studies on patient engagement and intent to undergo surgery.

At the end of 2023, Sword Health launched Atlas, a pain management platform available in 150 countries, incorporating clinically validated exercises and educational resources. The company also introduced Academy, a digital education platform focused on pain management, and On-Call, a service providing 24/7 access to clinical specialists. In 2024, the company released Phoenix, an AI-powered feature that applies natural language processing and computer vision to deliver real-time therapy feedback.

That same year, Sword Health introduced Outcome Pricing, a payment model that adjusts costs based on treatment outcomes. Several peer-reviewed studies during this period reported outcomes associated with Sword Health’s programs, including reductions in pain, anxiety, and surgery intent, as well as increased workplace productivity. In late 2024, the company was recognized by Fast Company’s World Changing Ideas Awards for innovation in digital healthcare.

=== Restructuring and workforce adjustments (2024) ===
In October 2024, Sword Health reduced its workforce by 17%, affecting treatment-facing clinicians as part of a company-wide restructuring. Sword Health cited efficiency and scalability as reasons for the restructuring. Reports noted that the shift was consistent with broader trends in the digital health sector, where companies increasingly incorporate AI into care models to optimize clinical workflows.

=== Acquisitions (2025-2026) ===
In 2025, Sword Health acquired Surgery Hero, a UK-based digital health company specializing in prehabilitation, an approach designed to help patients prepare for surgery with the goal of improving post-surgical recovery. Following the acquisition, Sword Health partnered with 18 NHS trusts in the UK to integrate digital prehabilitation services into existing healthcare programs.

In 2026, Sword Health acquired Headspace, a US-based digital mental health company.

=== Litigation ===
In July 2024, A2 Academy ("A2") filed a lawsuit against Sword Health asserting that A2 was owed a 5% ownership stake in the company, pursuant to an agreement associated with Sword's participation in its accelerator program from 2014-2015.

== Investment and funding history ==
As of 2024, Sword Health has raised over $340 million across multiple funding rounds.

- Seed Round (2018): $4.6 million to further develop its digital therapy platform.
- Series A (2019): $8 million, led by Khosla Ventures, to expand into the U.S. market.
- Series B (2020): $25 million to scale operations and advance AI-powered therapy solutions.
- Series C (June 2021): $85 million, bringing the company’s valuation to $1.8 billion.
- Series D (December 2021): $163 million, led by investors including General Catalyst, BOND, and Khosla Ventures, increasing valuation to $2 billion.
- Series E (June 2024): $130 million, raising the company’s valuation to $3 billion. The funding was allocated toward company operations and business development.

== See also ==
- List of unicorn startup companies
- Telerehabilitation
- Digital Health
- Telemedicine
- List of digital therapeutics companies
- Musculoskeletal disorder
- Artificial intelligence in healthcare
