= Jacob Helberg =

American government appointee and writer (born 1989)

- Helberg in 2024

22nd Under Secretary of State for Economic Affairs
- Incumbent
- Assumed office October 16, 2025
- President: Donald Trump
- Preceded by: Jose W. Fernandez

Personal details
- Born: November 9, 1989 (age 37) Saint-Germain-en-Laye, France
- Spouse: Keith Rabois (m. 2018)
- Education: George Washington University (BA); New York University (MS)
- Occupation: Technology advisor, writer

Jacob Helberg (born November 9, 1989) is an American and French writer and technology advisor. He is currently serving as the under secretary of state for economic affairs in the second Trump administration.

Helberg served as a commissioner for the U.S.–China Economic and Security Review Commission, and senior advisor to Alex Karp, CEO of Palantir Technologies. Helberg has commented extensively on U.S.–China relations, and the national security implications of Chinese-developed web apps like TikTok.

== Personal life ==
Helberg grew up in a Jewish family in France. He married American investor Keith Rabois in a 2018 ceremony officiated by businessman Sam Altman.

Helberg graduated from George Washington University with a BA and earned his MA from NYU's Cybersecurity Risk and Strategy program in 2020.

== Political involvement ==
Helberg became a leading advocate for the 2024 passage of the Protecting Americans from Foreign Adversary Controlled Applications Act, which forced a sale or ban of TikTok. Helberg is the founder of the Hill and Valley Forum, a working group of American venture capitalists and lawmakers concerned about China's impact on the American technology industry.

Helberg was one of the top donors to Donald Trump's 2024 reelection campaign, donating $2 million in 2024. Previously, Helberg primarily donated to Democratic candidates, including the Pete Buttigieg 2020 presidential campaign. He attributes his shift to the COVID-19 pandemic, technological concerns about China, and anti-Israel views among Democrats.

On December 10, 2024, President-elect Donald Trump announced Helberg would be the under secretary of state for economic growth, energy, and the environment in his second term.

== Publications ==
In 2021, Simon & Schuster published a book by Helberg, The Wires of War: Technology and the Global Struggle for Power. According to The Information, the book argues that "foreign adversaries are using technology to wage war against the U.S."
