= The Banker (2020 film) =

Film by George Nolfi

- Theatrical release poster
- Directed by: George Nolfi
- Screenplay by: Niceole Levy; George Nolfi; David Lewis Smith; Stan Younger
- Story by: David Lewis Smith; Stan Younger; Brad Caleb Kane
- Produced by: Joel Viertel; Brad Feinstein; George Nolfi; Nnamdi Asomugha; Jonathan Baker; David Lewis Smith; Anthony Mackie
- Starring: Anthony Mackie; Nicholas Hoult; Nia Long; Jessie T. Usher; Samuel L. Jackson
- Cinematography: Charlotte Bruus Christensen
- Edited by: Joel Viertel
- Music by: H. Scott Salinas
- Production companies: Romulus Entertainment; Mad Hatter; Iam21 Entertainment; Hyphenate Films
- Distributed by: Apple TV+
- Release date: March 6, 2020
- Running time: 120 minutes
- Country: United States
- Language: English
- Budget: $11 million

The Banker is a 2020 American period drama film directed, co-written and produced by George Nolfi. The film stars Anthony Mackie, Nicholas Hoult, Nia Long, Jessie T. Usher and Samuel L. Jackson. The story follows Joe Morris (Jackson) and Bernard Garrett (Mackie), two of the first African-American bankers in the United States. The film began a limited theatrical on March 6, 2020, before streaming on Apple TV+ on March 20. It received generally positive reviews from critics.

== Plot ==
In 1954, Bernard Garrett moves to Los Angeles with his wife and son, wanting to get into real estate but encounters racism that prevents him from being a successful real estate investor. Garrett buys a building from an Irish immigrant named Patrick Barker and fixes it up with his cousin and his cousin's friend Matt Steiner, a white man. Impressed by Garrett’s work, Barker offers him a partnership wherein they work together to buy and fix up buildings, with Barker being the acceptable face of the operation. This works well for them both until Barker dies and his wife refuses to honour the deal. Garrett instead goes into business with wealthy club owner Joe Morris convincing him to be his co-investor. Together they ask Matt to pose as the front of the company in meetings to facilitate the sales.

Eventually, they become extremely successful in Los Angeles real estate, with the two teaching Matt the basics of real estate investing. The three secure a number of properties in L.A. and effectively integrate a number of previously segregated neighborhoods by selling and renting to black families. After this success, he sets his sights on the local bank in his Texas hometown to give loans to the black residents. Racist bank practices had excluded black people from receiving loans for small businesses and homeownership. Joe protests the idea at first but eventually relents and the three move to Texas.

Matt buys the bank, fronting for Bernard and Joe, but the local townspeople are extremely suspicious of this move. A bank executive tracks the records of the loans and discovers that they're giving loans to black people, follows Matt and discovers that his partners are black, then threatens them with exposure which would cause "a run on the bank." Matt persuades Joe and Bernard to purchase a second bank and put him in charge of it despite his inexperience. The racist bank executive calls in a federal investigator who checks the records of Matt's bank and discovers numerous infractions attributable to Matt's carelessness. Matt, Bernard and Joe get arrested for violating federal banking laws.

Facing a fifty-year prison term, Matt takes a plea deal, falsely testifying that he was duped by Bernard and Joe. The next day, Bernard testifies passionately about black people being given the same opportunity for upward mobility as whites. He and Joe are convicted and serve time in prison; upon release, they go with Bernard's wife Eunice to live in the Bahamas in two homes which Matt had purchased for them with money Bernard had entrusted to him for that purpose the night before Bernard's testimony.

== Cast ==
- Anthony Mackie as Bernard Garrett
  - Jaylon Gordon as Bernard Jr. (11 years old)
- Nicholas Hoult as Matt Steiner
- Nia Long as Eunice Garrett
- Jessie T. Usher as Tony Jackson
- Colm Meaney as Patrick Barker
- Michael Harney as Melvin Belli
- Samuel L. Jackson as Joe Morris
- Paul Ben-Victor as Donald Silverthorne
- Taylor Black as Susie
- James Dumont
- Scott Daniel Johnson as Robert Florance, Jr.
- Gregalan Williams as Britton Garrett
- Rhoda Griffis as Mrs. Barker
- Travis West as Mrs. Cooper's son
- David Alexander as Mr. Miller

== Production ==
It was announced in October 2018 that George Nolfi would direct the film, which he co-wrote with Niceole Levy. Samuel L. Jackson, Anthony Mackie, Nicholas Hoult, Nia Long and Taylor Black were set to star, with filming beginning in Atlanta. The film was partially shot in Douglasville, Georgia and Newnan, Georgia. Additional casting was announced in November. The film's early apartment scenes were filmed at La Madre Arms apartments in Atlanta.

== Release ==
In July 2019, Apple TV+ acquired distribution rights to the film. It was set to have its world premiere at AFI Fest on November 21, 2019, followed by a limited theatrical release on December 6, 2019, and digital streaming in January 2020. However, after claims of sexual assault were made against one of the producers of the film, Bernard Garrett's son Bernie Jr., by his half-sisters, the premiere was cancelled and the film was pulled from the schedule.

The film was eventually released in a limited theatrical release on March 6, 2020, followed by digital streaming on March 20, 2020.

== Reception ==
=== Critical reception ===
On Rotten Tomatoes, the film has an approval rating of 79% with an average score of 6.8/10, based on 77 reviews. The site's critical consensus reads: "The Banker's timid approach to dramatizing its fact-based story is often outweighed by the trio of strong performances at its core." On Metacritic, the film has a weighted average score of 59 out of 100, based on 19 critics, indicating "mixed or average" reviews.

=== Accolades ===
Award	Year of ceremony	Category	Recipient(s)	Result	Ref.
Camerimage	2020	Main Competition	The Banker	Nominated	
Georgia Film Critics Association	2021	Oglethorpe Award for Excellence in Georgia Cinema	George Nolfi, Niceole Levy, David Lewis Smith, and Stan Younger	Nominated	
NAACP Image Awards	2021	Outstanding Independent Motion Picture	The Banker	Won	
NAACP Image Awards	2021	Outstanding Actor in a Motion Picture	Anthony Mackie	Nominated	
NAACP Image Awards	2021	Outstanding Supporting Actress in a Motion Picture	Nia Long	Nominated	
NAACP Image Awards	2021	Outstanding Ensemble Cast in a Motion Picture	The Banker	Nominated	
35th Golden Rooster Awards	2022	Best Foreign Language Film	The Banker	Nominated	
