= Hill and Valley Forum =

American political conference

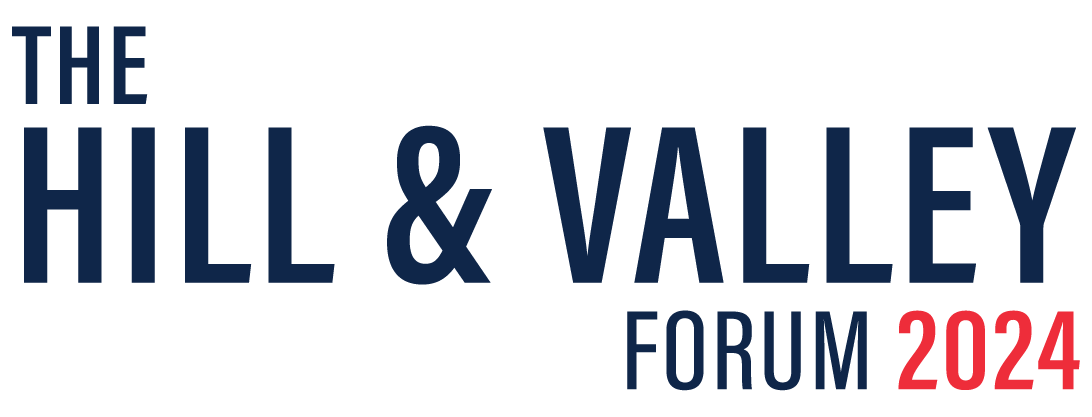
- Formation: March 2023
- Headquarters: Washington, D.C.
- Leader: Jacob Helberg
- Website: thehillandvalleyforum.com

The Hill and Valley Forum is a consortium of American lawmakers and venture capitalists first convened in March 2023 to combat China's influence on the US technology industry. Founded by United States–China Economic and Security Review Commission member Jacob Helberg alongside venture capitalists Christian Garrett and Delian Asparouhov, the working group also includes Peter Thiel and Vinod Khosla. The forum's initial private dinner in Washington, D.C. was held in advance of congressional testimony by TikTok CEO Shou Zi Chew, and was attended by then Speaker of the House Kevin McCarthy and Federal Communications Commissioner Brendan Carr.

The group's 2024 convening included sessions on the second space race, insights on novel military applications of AI, and perspectives on the US-China techno-economic war. Speakers included former President Donald Trump, Senate Majority Leader Chuck Schumer, Speaker of the House Mike Johnson, US senators Cory Booker, Kyrsten Sinema, Todd Young, Jeanne Shaheen, and Lindsey Graham, Anduril CEO Brian Schimpf, NVIDIA CEO Jensen Huang, AMD CEO Lisa Su, and Palantir CEO Alex Karp.
