= Digital therapeutics =

Subset of digital health

Digital therapeutics, a subset of digital health, are evidence-based therapeutic interventions driven by high quality software programs to prevent, manage, or treat a medical disorder or disease. Digital therapeutic companies should publish trial results inclusive of clinically meaningful outcomes in peer-reviewed journals. The treatment relies on behavioral and lifestyle changes usually spurred by a collection of digital impetuses. Because of the digital nature of the methodology, data can be collected and analyzed as both a progress report and a preventative measure. Treatments are being developed for the prevention and management of a wide variety of diseases and conditions, including type 1 & type II diabetes, congestive heart failure, obesity, Alzheimer's disease, dementia, asthma, substance abuse, ADHD, hypertension, anxiety, depression, and several others. Digital therapeutics often employ strategies rooted in cognitive behavioral therapy.

== Definitions ==
Although digital therapeutics can be employed in numerous ways, the term can broadly be defined as a treatment or therapy that utilizes digital and often Internet-based health technologies to spur changes in patient behavior. The use of digital products to improve health outcomes dates as far back as 2000. The term itself has been in use since around 2012. The first mention of the term in a peer-reviewed research publication was in 2015, in which Dr. Cameron Sepah formally defined the field as: "Digital therapeutics are evidence-based behavioral treatments delivered online that can increase accessibility and effectiveness of health care." Digital therapeutics can be used as a standalone therapy or in conjunction with more conventional treatments like pharmacological or in-person therapy. As of 2018, digital therapeutics continues to be an evolving field that medical professionals, students, and patients are beginning to utilize.

The Digital Therapeutics Alliance states: "Digital therapeutics (DTx) deliver evidence-based therapeutic interventions to patients that are driven by high quality software programs to prevent, manage, or treat a broad spectrum of physical, mental, and behavioral conditions." Digital therapeutics are different from wellness apps or medication reminders in that they require rigorous clinical evidence to substantiate intended use and impact on disease state.

It is often used as a preventive measure for patients who are at risk of developing more serious conditions. For instance, a patient with prediabetes may be prescribed digital therapeutics as a method to change their diet and behavior that could otherwise lead to a diabetes diagnosis. Digital therapeutics can also be used as a treatment option for existing conditions. For instance, a patient with type II diabetes can use digital therapeutics to manage the disease more effectively.

The methodology uses a variety of digital implements to help manage, monitor, and prevent illnesses in at-risk patients. These include mobile devices and technologies, apps, sensors, desktop computers, and various Internet of Things devices. These implements can collect a wide variety of data, ranging from big to small. Digital therapeutics can theoretically collect a high volume of data from a variety of sources. It also collects "smaller" data, "capturing personalized physiological parameters, behavior patterns and social and geographical patterns that can be recorded from multiple digital sources."

== Methodologies ==
Digital therapeutics can be used for a variety of conditions. There is no single methodology used in the practice of digital therapeutics. Many approaches use methods based upon cognitive behavioral therapy to spur patients to make lifestyle changes, reinforced with gamification, peer support, and in some cases telehealth such as coaching or psychotherapy. The method can be used to manage and improve outcomes in numerous conditions, including type II diabetes, Alzheimer's disease, dementia, congestive heart failure, chronic obstructive pulmonary disease, asthma, lung disease, obesity, substance abuse, ADHD, insomnia, hypertension, anxiety, depression, and others.

Methodologies can be as simple as psychoeducation or sending notifications designed to alter behavior to patients who are at risk of obesity or diabetes and as complex as administering an ingestible radio tag that communicates with an external sensor to monitor the efficacy of a given medication. Diabetes and obesity prevention and management is a major focus in the field of digital therapeutics. Connected devices like insulin pumps, blood glucose meters, and wearable devices can all send data to a unified system. The therapy also uses self-reported data like diet or other lifestyle factors. It is also often used to monitor the potential for heart and lung conditions and change behaviors like smoking, poor diet, or a lack of exercise.

Digital therapeutics can also be used to treat patients with psychological and neurological symptoms. For example, patients with disorders like ADHD, depression, and anxiety can receive cognitive behavioral therapy via their mobile devices. One study looked at the efficacy of avatar-based therapeutic interventions to reduce depressive symptoms. There is also evidence of how Avatar therapy can help in reducing the distress caused by voices in schizophrenia. Another study analyzed seven clinical trials to demonstrate the efficacy of a digital therapeutic in significantly reducing blood pressure. A preliminary study suggested that a mobile mindfulness app may be able to decrease acute stress while improving mood.

== Outcomes ==
The general consensus among researchers in the field of digital therapeutics is that the discipline requires more clinical data and investigation to be fully evaluated. Recent studies have begun to address this gap. A 2025 pragmatic non-inferiority study demonstrated that video-based behavioral activation therapy for perinatal depression, delivered by trained nonspecialists, was no less effective than in-person specialist care in reducing depressive and anxiety symptoms, supporting the clinical viability of human-supported tele-psychotherapy as a digital therapeutic. Supporting this, a 2021 systematic review found that nonspecialist-delivered counseling, often by phone or online, significantly lowered perinatal depression and anxiety compared with usual care.

A variety of studies have been conducted to evaluate the efficacy and impact of behavior change techniques that utilize a digital platform, however. In a meta-analysis of 85 such studies comprising a total sample size of over 43,000 participants, researchers discovered that digital therapeutics have a "statistically small but significant effect on health-related behavior." The study also showed that a broader use of theory, behavior change techniques, and modes of delivery (especially regular notifications) improved the efficacy of a given program.

Individual studies have also showed some benefits for patients. For instance, a diabetes prevention program using digital therapeutics saw participants lose an average of 4.7% of baseline body weight after 1 year (4.2% after 2 years) and undergo a 0.38% reduction in A1c levels after 1 year (0.43% after 2 years). Another weight loss pilot program using digital therapeutics reported a mean weight loss of 13.5 pounds (or 7.3% of baseline) with a significant average drop in both systolic and diastolic blood pressure (18.6 mmHg and 6.4 mmHg respectively). The study also saw a slight but statistically insignificant drop in total cholesterol, LDL, triglycerides, and A1c.

That said, the concept of outcomes and impact in the context of digital therapeutics is generally defined broader than strictly health outcomes. A recent review of 244 studies highlighted that, on top of improving health outcomes in certain circumstances as outlined above, the value of digital therapeutics can also arise from improving healthcare access to underserved populations and address health inequalities, or reducing healthcare expenditure. This broader interpretation has also called into question the fitness of traditional health technology assessment frameworks and given rise to calls to develop novel frameworks that embrace the variety of impacts that digital therapeutics can have.

== Regulation of digital therapeutics ==
While a broad range of unregulated health apps have historically been available in the App Store (iOS/iPadOS) or Google Play since their launch, many of these have been found to produce inconsistent, misleading, or dangerous results. In the United States, the Food and Drug Administration (FDA) regulates many digital therapeutic products under its Software as a Medical Device (SaMD) framework. This approach requires developers to show that their products are safe and effective, and that quality-management procedures remain in place as the software is updated.

However, in an assessment of 4,936 apps that fall under the SaMD umbrella in the United States published in 2019, only 105 (2.13%) included a specific summary of their cybersecurity content.[38] While the content of cybersecurity in SaMD devices was observed to be growing in newer SaMD applications, the (perceived) absence of clear cybersecurity measures in the vast majority of SaMD devices remains a substantial barrier for patients and health professionals to start using digital therapeutics in practice.[33]

In the European Union, regulation (EU) 2017/745, commonly known as "EU MDR" classifies potential digital therapeutics in terms of their intended use, application, and potential to cause harm. Because digital therapeutics are increasingly operating within a regulated environment, the degree of documentation and regulatory compliance (such as ISO 13485 or the CE mark) has increased too.

== Reimbursement and commercialization ==
Unlike medication or the billable hours of healthcare professionals, there are not currently clear pathways to reimbursement in most health systems. While many manufacturers seek FDA clearance or approval, this is only the first step on the path to being reimbursed for the use of a DTX. Accordingly, digital therapeutics companies pursue a range of business models:

- Direct-to-consumer (DTC) - A digital therapeutic available directly through a smartphone's app store. Business models available include Freemium, subscriptions, advertising, and selling the anonymized data to third parties
- Business-to-business (B2B) - Employers may wish to make digital therapeutics available for their workforce, either directly as a benefit or via a benefits administration company
- Pharmaceutical industry partnership - Jointly developing solutions either to directly treat patients or to be used adjunctively i.e. in tandem with a drug, where the DTx may serve to enhance the effectiveness of the drug by promoting medication adherence or having its own effect. While such partnerships can bring in multi-million dollar revenues, ultimately the pharmaceutical company itself will seek reimbursement and is potentially not the ultimate customer.
- Payer reimbursement - Being paid directly by a health system or health insurance company. While still in a nascent state in most countries, lobbying efforts are underway in the US for there to be specific reimbursement codes for DTx. Germany is the first country with specific processes for reimbursement (known as DiGA), with France, Italy, Austria and the UK currently considering new pathways to reimbursement. Although German physicians and insurers can prescribe digital therapeutics and be reimbursed at a national level for around 300 Euro per course of treatment, adoption to date has been slow.

To help build the business case for their usage, DTx companies often commission health economics evaluations of their interventions to show that their use ultimately lowers healthcare costs in the medium-long term, such as by reducing the need for hospital admissions or expensive surgeries.

== See also ==
- List of digital therapeutics companies
