= Bernard Garrett =

American businessman, investor and banker (1925–1999)

Bernard Garrett Sr.
- Bernard Garrett Sr. in 1965
- Born: September 19, 1925; Willis, Texas, U.S.
- Died: September 9, 1999 (aged 73)
- Occupations: Businessperson, investor, banker

Bernard S. Garrett Sr. (September 19, 1925 – September 9, 1999) was an American businessman, investor and banker.

== Early life and education ==
Bernard Garrett Sr. was born on September 19, 1925, in Willis, Texas. He completed 11th grade in Houston, Texas, and married his first wife, Eunice. They moved to Inglewood, California, and in 1958, Eunice gave birth to their son, Bernard Garrett Jr. They subsequently separated and divorced in 1959.

Bernard met Linda Marie Guillemette in 1960 and in 1962, they were married. By 1963, Bernard and Linda had acquired a wealth of real estate holdings all over California, including the prestigious Bankers Building in downtown Los Angeles, which they purchased that same year. They joined Martin Luther King Jr.'s August 1963 March on Washington for Jobs and Freedom.

== Career ==
Garrett started and ran a cleaning business in Texas. In 1945, the family moved to California where Garrett started another cleaning business and a wastepaper collection business.

When Garrett wanted to buy an apartment building in a white neighborhood in Los Angeles, he worked out a deal with the owner, Mr. Barker, who, along with a bank, lent Garrett money to renovate the apartment units. Garrett was successful in renting the units to black residents and in paying back the loans. He and Barker formed a partnership investing in real estate.

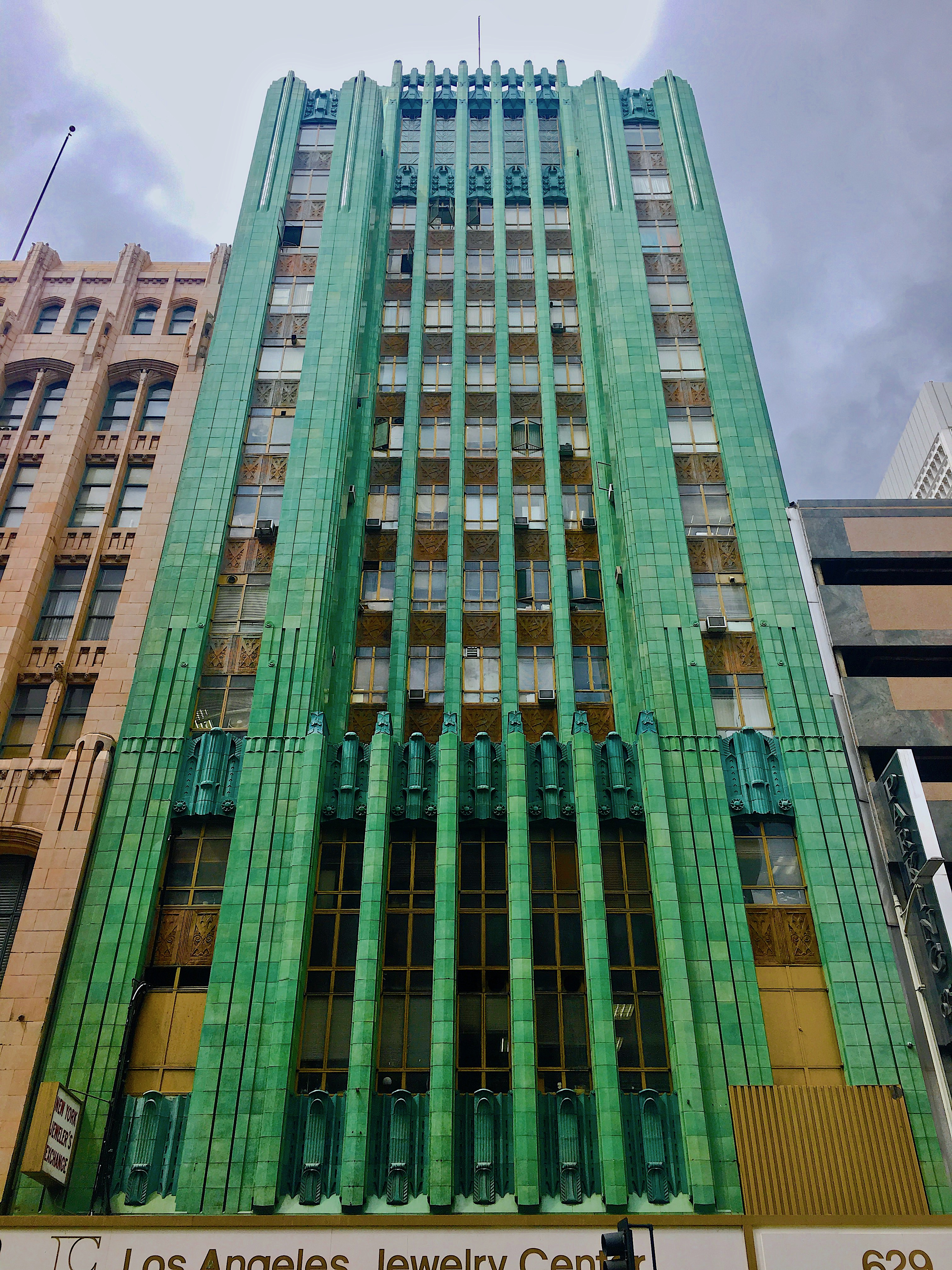
The Bankers Building in Los Angeles (now called the Los Angeles Jewelry Center)

By 1954, Garrett was worth $1.5 million. He proposed a deal to Black businessman Joseph B. Morris that they purchase real estate together. Morris was a UCLA graduate who had once owned two nightclubs. Joe and his wife Cora became friends with Linda and Bernard. Together they bought the Bankers Building, the tallest building in Los Angeles. They succeeded by having light- or white-skinned associates, most significantly Linda, whose skin was very fair, pose as the faces of their empire, appearing to run their operations while, in fact, Garrett and Morris were the owners and actual operators of the properties.

Morris and Garrett went on to purchase multiple banks and savings & loans, in Texas. They acquired their first bank in Texas in 1964, going on to buy an additional four banks and savings & loans. A racist Democratic power base eventually found a way to stop the Garretts' growing banking control of white banks in Texas. Senator John L. McClellan from Arkansas brought Garrett before the Senate Investigations Committee in 1965 in part because of the collapse and insolvency of The First National Bank of Marlin in Texas, which they controlled.

In 1967, they were put on trial for the misapplication of funds and a conspiracy to defraud the bank by using funds for personal purposes. The Garretts hired lawyers Melvin Belli—who had defended Jack Ruby—and Joe Tonahill to defend him. Garrett was sentenced in 1967 to three years at Federal Correctional Institution, Terminal Island near Long Beach, California, shortly after his second daughter, Sheila, was born. Both he and Morris served 9 months and were later pardoned by President Johnson.

The Garretts built another real estate empire to invest in the newly independent Bahamas. By 1976, they moved their family of six children to the Bahamas to run a large marina they bought, while awaiting bank charter approval to own banks in the Bahamas. The Garretts hoped to own banks in the Bahamas, until they encountered a banking charter denial due to Mr. Garrett's prior conviction in Texas. They eventually moved back to the United States.

Garrett died in 1999.

== Personal life ==
Bernard and Linda Garrett had six children. The couple divorced in 1977–78. Garrett went on to marry Kathy Ussery. They had two sons. Garrett is the father of actress and philanthropist Cynthia Garrett and grandfather of venture capitalist Christian Garrett. Shortly before the scheduled premiere of the 2020 biographical film The Banker, Garrett's son, Bernie Jr., was accused of sexually abusing his half-sisters Cynthia and Sheila. He denied the allegations.

== Legacy ==
Garrett's and Morris's story was adapted into the 2020 film The Banker.

In 2020, the family established The Bernard Garrett Sr. Foundation, a public foundation focused on financial literacy and opportunity for African Americans.
