= Keith Rabois =

American technology executive and investor

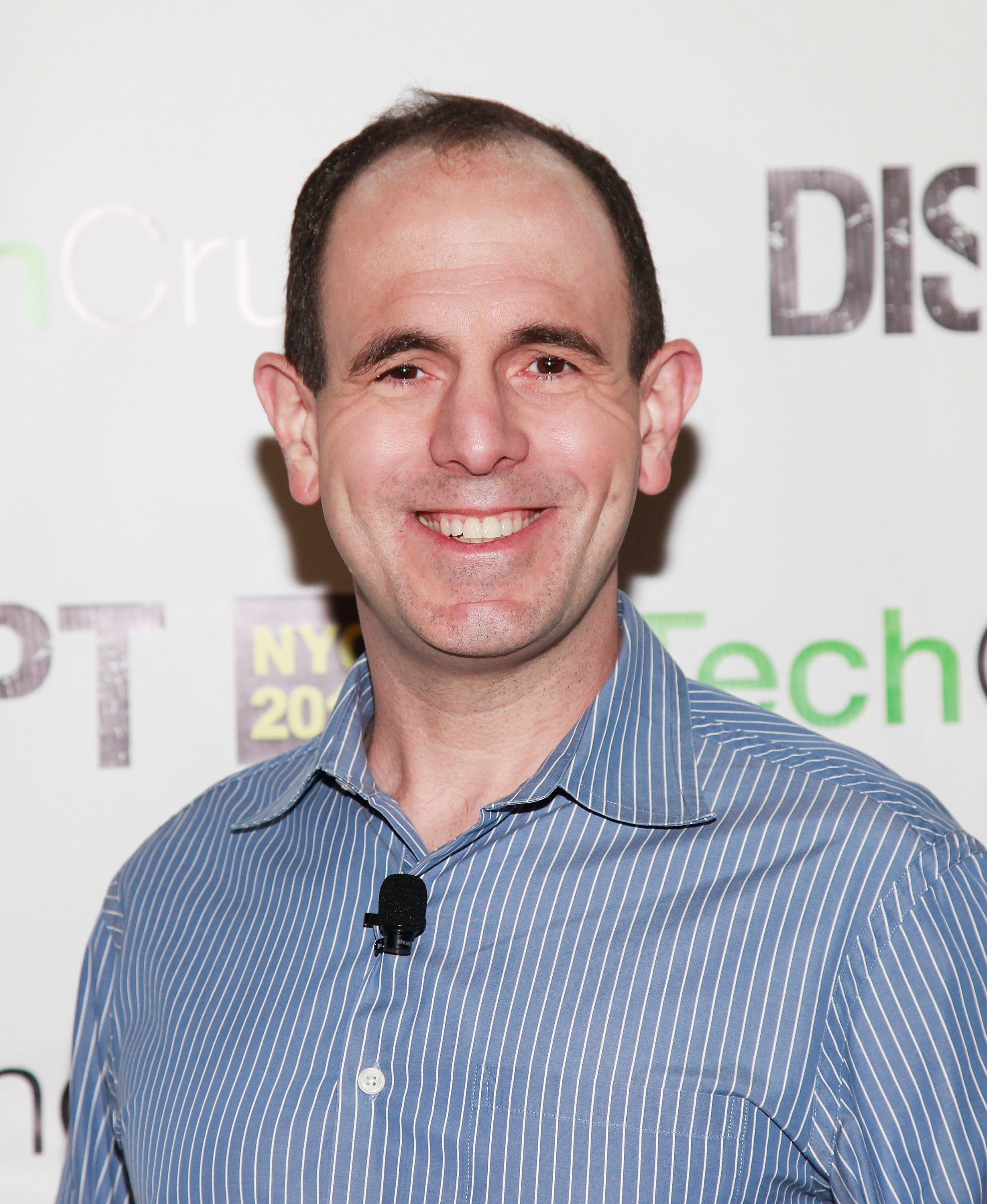
- Rabois in 2011
- Born: March 17, 1969 (age 57); Edison, New Jersey, U.S.
- Education: Stanford University (BA); Harvard University (JD)
- Occupations: Entrepreneur, Investor, Lawyer
- Known for: PayPal, LinkedIn, Square, Opendoor, Yelp, Xoom, YouTube, Yammer, Palantir, Lyft, AirBnB, Opendoor,Eventbrite and Quora.
- Spouse: Jacob Helberg

Keith Rabois (born March 17, 1969) is an American technology executive and investor. He is a managing director at Khosla Ventures and a co-founder of Opendoor. He was an early-stage startup investor, and executive, at PayPal, LinkedIn, and Square. Rabois invested in Yelp and the Xoom Corporation prior to each company's initial public offering (IPO). For both investments he insisted on being a board of directors member.

Rabois is considered a member of the PayPal Mafia. Rabois has been involved in investments in YouTube, Palantir Technologies, Lyft, Airbnb, and other companies.

== Early life and education ==
Rabois was born on March 17, 1969, and raised in Edison, New Jersey. He studied political science as an undergraduate at Stanford University, receiving his B.A. in 1991 and a J.D. from Harvard Law School in 1994. While at Stanford, he became acquainted with Peter Thiel, then-editor and co-founder of The Stanford Review. Rabois later contributed to the libertarian newspaper. Rabois was one of several students reprimanded for shouting homophobic slurs outside an instructor's home, including the suggestion that the instructor "die of AIDS." Rabois stated that the incident was designed to challenge Stanford's rules on student speech. Thiel later defended Rabois in his book, The Diversity Myth: Multiculturalism and Political Intolerance on Campus.

== Career ==
=== Postgraduate ===
He clerked for the United States Court of Appeals for the Fifth Circuit for a year and worked at Sullivan & Cromwell for nearly four years. In 1999, he was an adviser to Dan Quayle's presidential campaign.

=== Information Technology ===
==== PayPal ====
Rabois was Executive Vice President, Business Development, Public Affairs, and Policy at PayPal from November 2000 to November 2002.

==== LinkedIn ====
Between January 2005 and May 2007, Rabois worked at LinkedIn as its vice president for Business and Corporate Development. LinkedIn was founded by Reid Hoffman, also a former employee at PayPal and a member of the PayPal Mafia.

==== Square ====
After some unsuccessful ventures, in 2010, Rabois joined Square, a company that provides an electronic payment service, as its Chief Operating Officer (COO).

===== Sexual harassment charge =====
Rabois left Square in January 2013 due to the threat of a lawsuit over sexual harassment accusations by a male employee; Rabois claims that the relationship was consensual. A spokesperson from Square said in a statement that "Keith exercised poor judgment that ultimately undermined his ability to remain an effective leader at Square."

=== Venture capital ===
==== Khosla Ventures ====
In March 2013, Rabois joined venture capital firm Khosla Ventures. Rabois left in 2019. In January 2015, Rabois joined the board of directors of Scribd as an observer after Khosla Ventures led a new investment round in the company. Rabois returned to Khosla Ventures in January 2024 as one of five managing directors.

==== Founders Fund ====
In 2019 Rabois left Khosla Ventures and joined Founders Fund as a general partner.

In 2021 while at Founders Fund Rabois co-founded Miami-based OpenStore, a retail-holding startup that acquire brands in the Shopify ecosystem. It raised $75 million at a $750 million valuation.

Rabois left Founders Fund in January 2024 to rejoin Khosla Ventures, but continues to represent it on the boards of Ramp, Found, Trade Republic, and Pietra.

=== Other ventures ===
==== Opendoor ====
In April 2014, Rabois co-founded Opendoor, a home buying and selling marketplace.

==== Alliance of American Football ====
In March 2018, Rabois invested in the Alliance of American Football, along with Peter Thiel and Peter Chernin. He sat on the league's board of directors.

== Politics ==
In April 2013, a lobbying group called FWD.us was launched, with Rabois listed as one of a major contributor on the group's website. In January 2020, Rabois stated that he would rather vote for Donald Trump than Bernie Sanders.

In 2023, Rabois praised the Parental Rights in Education Act law in Florida.

In September 2024, he hosted JD Vance for a fundraiser in support of Donald Trump’s presidential campaign.

During the Gaza war, Rabois regularly expressed support for the Israeli government, and rejected evidence of Palestinian civilians killed in airstrikes. In one post, he asserted that the IDF was "the most ethical military in world history".

On the day of the killing of Alex Pretti, Rabois asserted that "no law enforcement has shot an innocent person" and that "illegals are committing violent crimes every day." Khosla Ventures founder Vinod Khosla and partner Ethan Choi subsequently disavowed Rabois' comments about ICE.

== Personal life ==
In November 2015, Rabois purchased a house in the Glen Park neighborhood of San Francisco. He planned a renovation that included a new penthouse level, a basketball court, lockers and a sauna, but received pushback from six of his neighbors.

In 2018, Rabois married Jacob Helberg. The ceremony held in Saint Barthélemy was officiated by Sam Altman.

In November 2020, it was reported that they moved from California to Miami, Florida. In February 2025, the Wall Street Journal reported that Rabois and Helberg were seeking to sell their Miami Beach home for $65 million.
