= Gina Rodriguez =

American actress (born 1984)

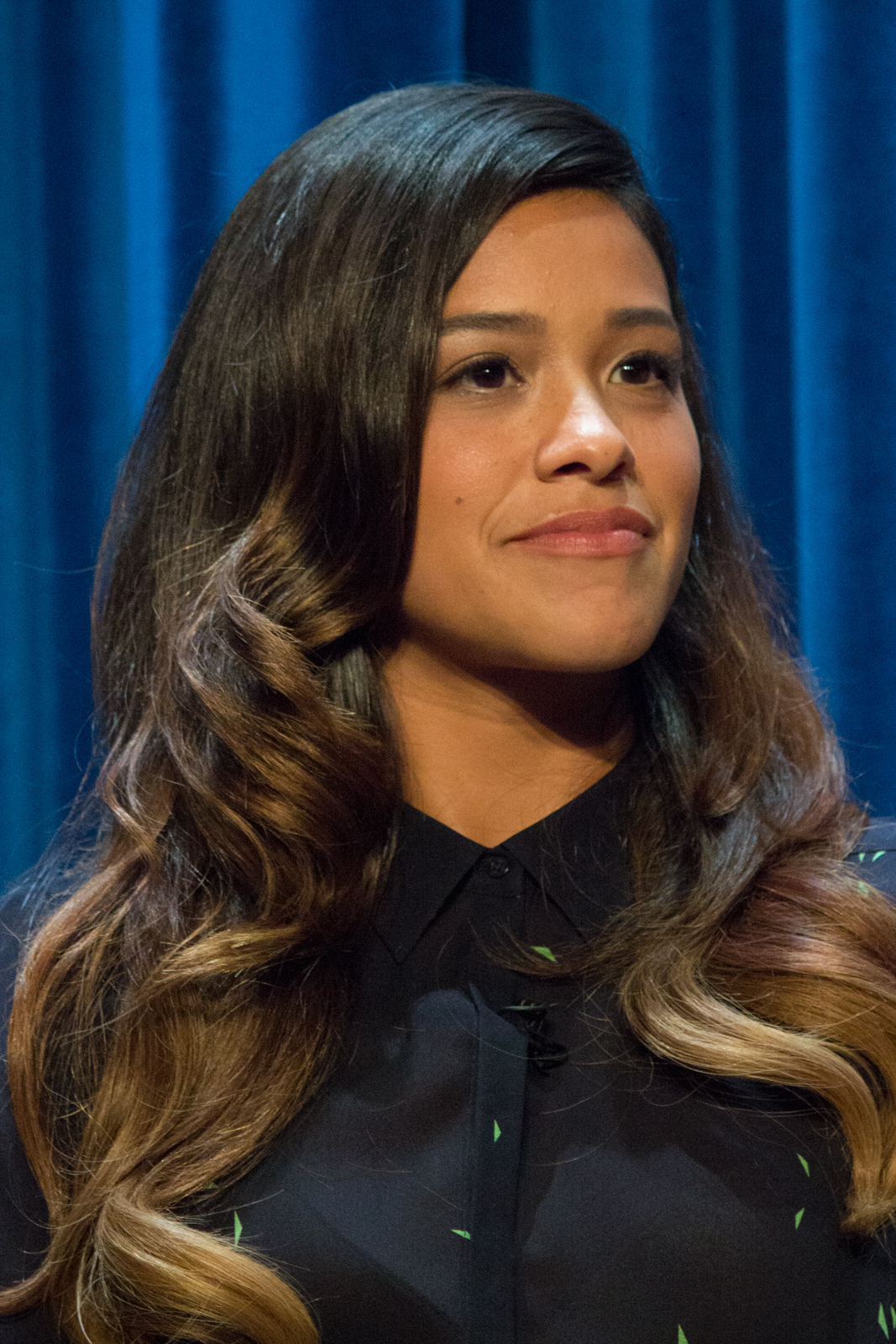
- Rodriguez in 2014
- Born: Gina Alexis Rodriguez; July 30, 1984 (age 42); Chicago, Illinois, U.S.
- Education: New York University (BFA)
- Occupation: Actress
- Years active: 2003–present
- Spouse: Joe LoCicero (m. 2019)
- Children: 2

Gina Alexis Rodriguez (born July 30, 1984) is an American actress. She is known for her leading role as Jane Gloriana Villanueva in The CW satirical romantic dramedy series Jane the Virgin (2014–2019), for which she received a Golden Globe Award in 2015.

Born and raised in Chicago, Rodriguez began her career in 2003 in theater productions and made her screen debut in an episode of the police procedural drama series Law & Order. Her breakthrough came in 2012, in the independent musical-drama film Filly Brown. Gina gave a memorable performance in the 2013 "Party's Over" episode of Longmire. She has gone on to star in such films as Deepwater Horizon (2016), Ferdinand (2017), Annihilation, Smallfoot (both 2018), Miss Bala (2019), Someone Great (2019), Scoob! (2020), Awake (2021), I Want You Back (2022), and Spy Kids: Armageddon (2023). She voiced the titular character of the Netflix animated action-adventure series Carmen Sandiego (2019–21) and starred and executive produced the Disney+ comedy-drama series Diary of a Future President (2020–21) and the ABC comedy series Not Dead Yet (2023–24).

== Early life ==
Rodriguez was born on July 30, 1984, in Chicago, Illinois, the youngest daughter of Puerto Rican parents, Magali and Gino Rodriguez. Her father was a boxing referee. She has an older brother and two sisters. She was raised in the Belmont Cragin neighborhood on Chicago's Northside.

At the age of seven, Rodriguez performed at the salsa dance company Fantasia Juvenil. Rodriguez was raised Catholic, and went to high school at St. Ignatius College Prep. She focused on salsa dancing until age 17 when she began acting more.

At the age of 16, she was among thirteen teenagers to be accepted into Columbia University's Theatrical Collaboration. She attended NYU's Tisch School of the Arts. She trained for four years at the Atlantic Theater Company and Experimental Theatre Wing, and earned a Bachelor of Fine Arts degree in 2005.

She portrayed Frida Kahlo in the world premiere of Casa Blue in the UK, and in the play called The Last Moments in the Life of Frida Kahlo at the American Stage Theatre.

== Career ==
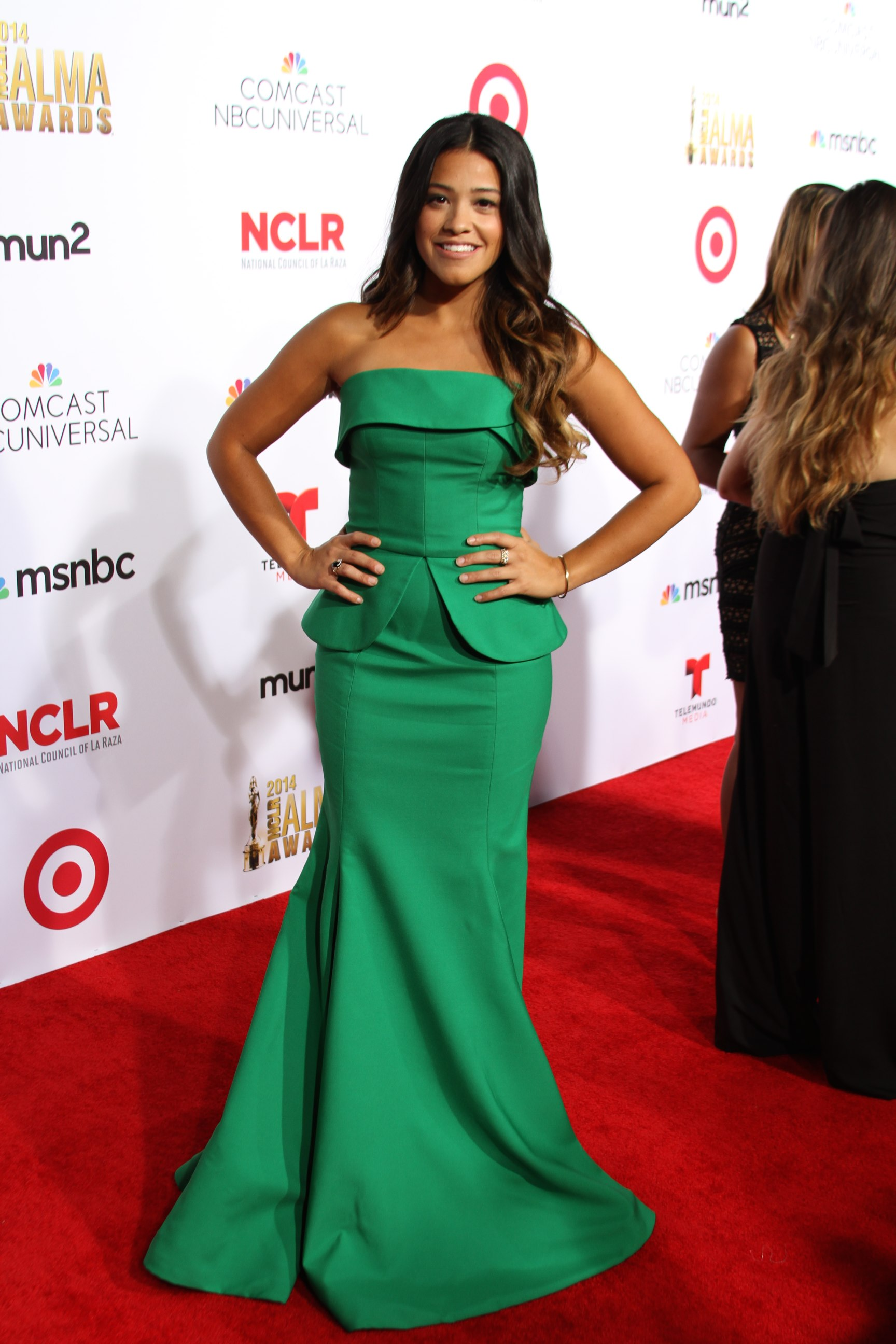
Rodriguez at the 2014 ALMA Awards

Rodriguez made her screen debut appearing in an episode of Law & Order in 2004. She later has appeared on Eleventh Hour, Army Wives and The Mentalist. On October 19, 2011, Rodriguez landed the recurring role, Beverly, in the soap opera series The Bold and the Beautiful. She received a role in the musical film Go for It!, for which she received a 2011 Imagen Awards nomination.

In 2012, Rodriguez played young hip-hop artist Majo Tenorio in the independent musical-drama film Filly Brown, for which she won an Imaged Award. She received good reviews for her performance in film. She also was the recipient of the Best Actor Award at the First Run Film Festival in New York. On June 9, 2013, Gina won the Inaugural Lupe Award. On April 16, 2013, during an interview, she revealed she was offered a role in the Lifetime television series Devious Maids, but turned it down. On October 16, 2013, she joined the cast of the film Sleeping With The Fishes.

On February 27, 2014, Entertainment Weekly announced that Rodriguez would play the titular role of Jane Villanueva in Jane the Virgin, for which she went on to win a Golden Globe Award. On June 4, 2014, Rodriguez joined the cast of the drama film Sticky Notes. In August 2015, she co-hosted the 2015 Teen Choice Awards with Ludacris and Josh Peck. She voiced Mary in the animated film The Star, which was released in November 2017, as well as Una in Blue Sky Studios' Ferdinand a month later and played Anya in the science fiction thriller film Annihilation, opposite Natalie Portman. She also voices Carmen Sandiego in the Netflix animated series Carmen Sandiego which premiered on January 18, 2019. In March 2018, Netflix announced that they had acquired the live-action film rights for Carmen Sandiego and that Rodriguez would star as Sandiego in the film.

Rodriguez owns the production company I Can & I Will Productions. She worked on projects at CBS and The CW centered around the Latino community. She served as a producer and starred in the 2019 Netflix romantic comedy film Someone Great.

In 2019, Rodriguez starred as the title character in the action thriller film Miss Bala. In the same year, it was announced that Rodriguez was cast in the upcoming Netflix science fiction thriller Awake. She also voiced the role of Velma Dinkley in the animated adventure film Scoob!.

Rodriguez served as the executive producer for the Disney+ show Diary of a Future President, where she also starred as the title character as an adult. She was nominated for the Children's and Family Emmy Award for Outstanding Guest Performance for the show's second season.

In 2024, Rodriguez was announced as one of the co-hosts (along with Shaquille O'Neal) of the ABC game show Lucky 13. The series premiered on July 18, 2024.

== Personal life ==
In an interview, Rodriguez revealed that she was diagnosed with Hashimoto's disease, a thyroid condition, at the age of 19.

In a 2014 interview, she said, "I grew up Catholic. I have Jewish in my family and I attend a Christian church in Hollywood. I am basically all over the place."

In 2016, Rodriguez began dating actor and mixed martial arts fighter Joe LoCicero, whom she met on the set of Jane the Virgin. They were engaged in August 2018 and were married on May 4, 2019. She gave birth to their son in March 2023. In December 2025, Rodriguez and LoCicero had a second child, a girl.

On October 15, 2019, Rodriguez posted an apology to Instagram for posting a since-deleted video of herself saying the N word while singing along to "Ready or Not" by the Fugees, garnering widespread public backlash. Within hours, she posted a second apology on the platform, stating: "The word I sang carries…a legacy of hurt and pain that I cannot even imagine…I feel so deeply protective and responsible to the community of color but I have let this community down. I have some serious learning and growing to do and I am so deeply sorry for the pain that I have caused."

== Philanthropy ==
Rodriguez has been involved with various charities and philanthropic efforts, made possible by her rising visibility as a film and television actress. In 2015, she became involved in Custom Ink and Naja Lingerie, both of which Rodriguez has stated have a special connection to her life and experiences.

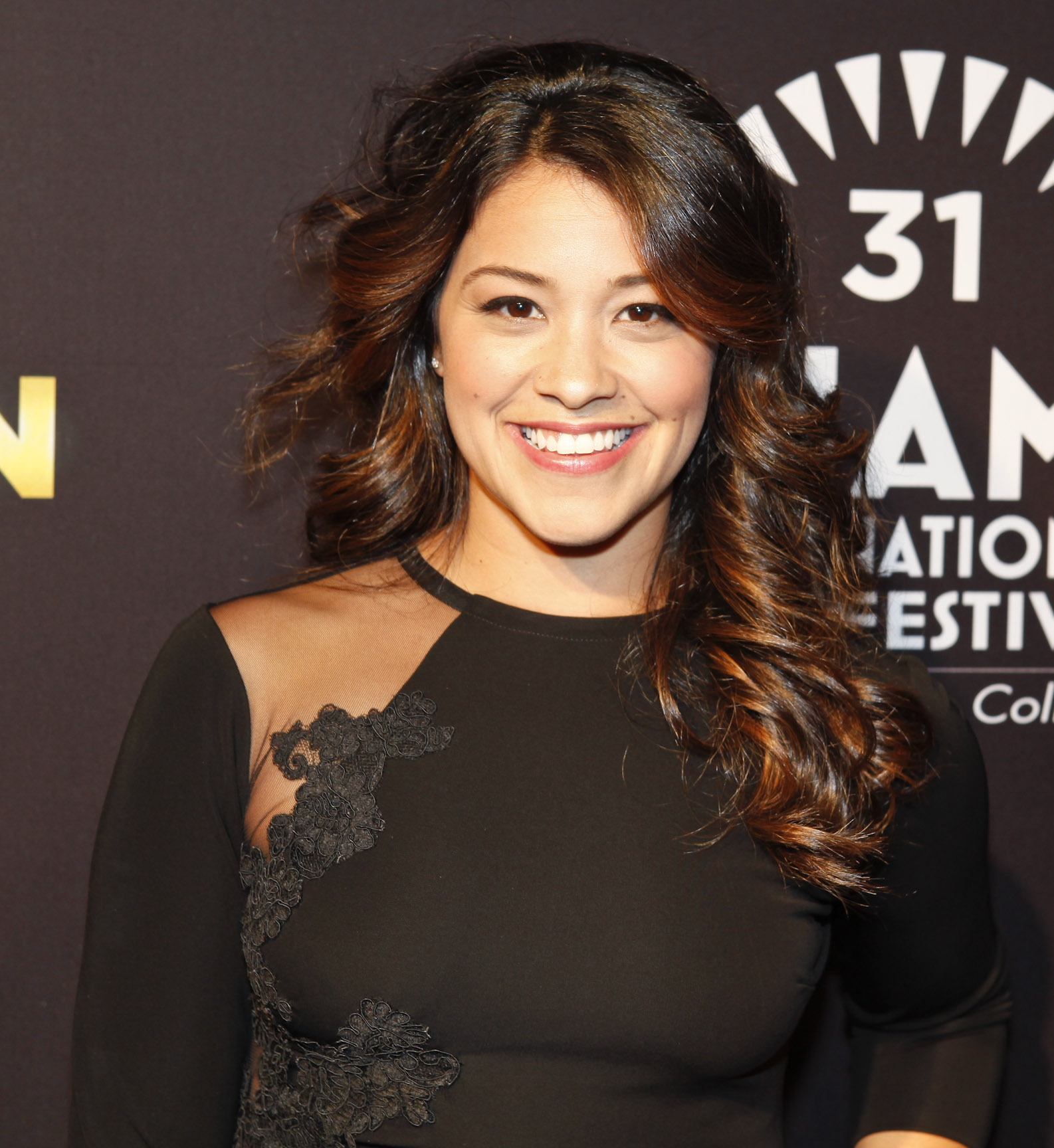
Gina Rodriguez at the Miami premiere of Filly Brown

On March 16, 2015, she was announced as a member of the board of directors of the Hispanic Scholarship Fund (HSF), the largest non-profit organization in the U.S. that supports Hispanic American higher education. Because attaining an education was the biggest priority in Rodriguez's household, coupled with her determination to work towards a degree, she was able to work towards receiving a HSF scholarship.

Later in 2015, PACER's (The Parent Advocacy Coalition for Educational Rights) National Bullying Prevention Center teamed up with Custom Ink and enlisted the help of various celebrities, Rodriguez among them, to raise money for their fifth annual "Be Good to Each Other Campaign". Throughout the month of October 2015, people were encouraged to purchase a celebri-tee from Custom Ink, who donated all the proceeds from bullying prevention T-shirts to PACER. Rodriguez, in designing a celebri-tee which featured the phrase "Kindness Is Always In Style" in cursive print, took a stand for kindness, acceptance, and inclusion in support of bullying prevention, and stated that her parents always taught [her] the power of thinking positively and treating others with respect. She also hopes that through the Be Good to Each Other Campaign, such a message could be continued to be spread to younger generations.

In 2016, Rodriguez was named to Oprah's SuperSoul 100 list of visionaries and influential leaders. In 2017, Rodriguez, among several other artists, sang on the single "Almost Like Praying". Sparked by Lin-Manuel Miranda, creator of Broadway's Hamilton, all proceeds from the song benefited those affected by Hurricane Maria in Puerto Rico.

== Filmography ==
=== Film ===
Year	Title	Role	Notes
2008	Calling It Quits	Day player	
2008	Ten: Thirty One	Neighborhood Girl	Short film
2009	Osvaldo's	Ana Daisy	Short film
2010	Our Family Wedding	Bridesmaid	
2010	Little Spoon	Mandy	Short film
2011	Go for It!	G	
2012	Filly Brown	Majo Tenorio	
2012	California Winter	Ofelia Ramirez	
2013	Interstate	Nayeli	Short film
2013	Enter the Dangerous Mind	Adrienne	
2013	The Price We Pay	Medic	Voice, short film
2013	Sleeping with the Fishes	Alexis Fish	
2013	Una Y Otra Y Otra Ve	Girlfriend	Short film
2014	Since I Laid Eyes	Ilene	Short film
2014	C'est Jane	Jane	Short film
2016	Sticky Notes	Natalia	
2016	Deepwater Horizon	Andrea Fleytas	
2017	The Star	Mary	Voice
2017	Ferdinand	Una	Voice
2018	Annihilation	Anya Thorensen	
2018	Smallfoot	Kolka	Voice
2018	Sharon 1.2.3.	Cindy	
2019	Miss Bala	Gloria Fuentes	
2019	Someone Great	Jenny Young	Also producer
2019	Andy's Song	Tavi	Short film
2020	Kajillionaire	Melanie Whitacre	
2020	Scoob!	Velma Dinkley	Voice
2021	Awake	Jill Adams	Also executive producer
2022	I Want You Back	Anne	
2023	Parachute	Dr. Akerman	
2023	Spy Kids: Armageddon	Nora Tango-Torrez	
2024	Players	Mack	Also executive producer

=== Television ===
Year	Title	Role	Notes
2004, 2008	Law & Order	Yolanda; Inez Soriano	1 episode each
2005	Jonny Zero	Rose	Episode: "La Familia"
2009	Eleventh Hour	Robin	Episode: "Subway"
2010	10 Things I Hate About You	Danica	Episode: "Meat Is Murder"
2010	Army Wives	Marisol Evans	3 episodes
2010	My Super Psycho Sweet 16: Part 2	Courtney Ramirez	TV movie
2011	Happy Endings	Rita	Episode: "Why Can't You Read Me?"
2011	The Mentalist	Elvia	Episode: "Pink Tops"
2011–12	The Bold and the Beautiful	Beverly	Recurring role; 15 episodes
2012	No Names	Megan	3 episodes
2013	Longmire	Lorna Dove	Episode: "Party's Over"
2013	Rizzoli & Isles	Lourdes Santana	Episode: "Built for Speed"
2014	Wild Blue	Pilar Robles	TV movie
2014–19	Jane the Virgin	Jane Villanueva	Title role
2016	Lip Sync Battle	Herself	Episode: "Gina Rodriguez vs. Wilmer Valderrama"
2017	Drop the Mic	Herself	Episode: "James Van Der Beek vs. Randall Park / Gina Rodriguez vs. Rob Gronkowski"
2018	Brooklyn Nine-Nine	Alicia	Episode: "Jake & Amy"
2018	Animals	Narrator	Voice, episode: "Pigeons"
2018–2025	Big Mouth	Gina Alvarez	Voice, recurring role (seasons 2–6)
2018–19	Elena of Avalor	Princess Marisa	Voice, 3 episodes
2019–21	Carmen Sandiego	Carmen Sandiego	Voice, title role
2019	Robot Chicken	Ginger	Voice, episode: "Robot Chicken's Santa's Dead (Spoiler Alert) Holiday Murder Thing Special"
2019	RuPaul's Drag Race	Herself	Episode: "Dragracadabra"
2020–21	Diary of a Future President	Future President Elena	Main cast; also executive producer
2022	Lost Ollie	Momma	Main cast
2022	Batwheels	Catwoman	Voice
2023–24	Not Dead Yet	Nell Serrano	Main cast; also executive producer
2024	Lucky 13	Co-host	Game show; also executive producer
2025	Will Trent	Marion Alba	Main cast (season 3)
2025	Long Story Short	Rachel "Baby" Feldstein	Voice, 3 episodes
2026	Matlock	Lida Gutierrez	Special guest star (season 2)

=== Directing ===
Year	Title	Notes
2018–19	Jane the Virgin	3 episodes
2019	Charmed	Episode: "Witch Perfect"
2020–2021	Diary of a Future President	2 episodes
2021	Doogie Kameāloha, M.D.	Episode: "Talk-Story"
2022	Good Sam	Episode: "Butt of the Joke"

== Awards and nominations ==
Year	Association	Category	Nominated work	Result	Ref.
2011	Imagen Award	Best Supporting Actress – Feature Film	Go for It!	Nominated	
2012	Imagen Award	Best Actress – Feature Film	Filly Brown	Won	
2013	ALMA Award	Achievement in Film (with Edward James Olmos, Michael D. Olmos, and Lou Diamond Phillips)	Filly Brown	Won	
2013	Inaugural Lupe Special Achievement Award	Honoree	Gina Rodriguez	Won	
2014	Imagen Award	Best Actress/Supporting Actress - Feature Film	Sleeping with the Fishes	Nominated	
2014	Young Hollywood Award	Rising Star of the Year	—N/a	Won	
2015	Golden Globe Award	Best Actress – Television Series Musical or Comedy	Jane the Virgin	Won	
2015	Critics' Choice Award	Best Actress in a Comedy Series	Jane the Virgin	Nominated	
2015	EWwy Award	Best Actress – Comedy	Jane the Virgin	Won	
2015	Television Critics Association	Individual Achievement in Comedy	Jane the Virgin	Nominated	
2015	Teen Choice Award	Choice TV Actress – Comedy	Jane the Virgin	Nominated	
2015	Teen Choice Award	Choice TV Breakout Star	Jane the Virgin	Nominated	
2015	Teen Choice Award	Choice TV Liplock (with Justin Baldoni)	Jane the Virgin	Nominated	
2015	Imagen Awards	Best Actress – Television	Jane the Virgin	Won	
2015	Online Film & Television Association Award	Best Actress in a Comedy Series	Jane the Virgin	Nominated	
2015	Women's Image Network Award	Outstanding Actress in a Comedy Series	Jane the Virgin	Nominated	
2015	Dorian Award	Rising Star Award	—N/a	Won	
2015	Girl Power Media Role Model	Honoree	Jane the Virgin	Won	
2015	NHMC Impact Gala Award	Honoree	Jane the Virgin	Won	
2015	Feelies Award	Best Actress	Jane the Virgin	Won	
2016	Golden Globe Award	Best Actress – Television Series Musical or Comedy	Jane the Virgin	Nominated	
2016	NAACP Image Award	Outstanding Actress in a Comedy Series	Jane the Virgin	Nominated	
2016	Critics' Choice Award	Best Actress in a Comedy Series	Jane the Virgin	Nominated	
2016	Satellite Award	Best Actress – Television Series Musical or Comedy	Jane the Virgin	Nominated	
2016	Teen Choice Award	Choice Comedy TV Actress	Jane the Virgin	Nominated	
2016	Imagen Award	Best Actress – Television	Jane the Virgin	Won	
2016	CinemaCon Award	Female Star of Tomorrow	—N/a	Won	
2016	Unite 4 Humanity Award	Honoree	Gina Rodriguez	Won	
2016	Lip Sync Battle Award	Performer	Gina Rodriguez	Won	
2016	Feelies Award	Best Actress	Gina Rodriguez	Won	
2016	TVLine Performance of the Week	Honoree	Gina Rodriguez	Won	
2017	Golden Globe Award	Best Actress – Television Series Musical or Comedy	Jane the Virgin	Nominated	
2017	People's Choice Award	Favorite Comedic TV Actress	Jane the Virgin	Nominated	
2017	MTV Award	Best Actor in a Show	Jane the Virgin	Nominated	
2017	Teen Choice Award	Choice TV Actress - Comedy	Jane the Virgin	Nominated	
2017	Icon Hispanic Heritage Month	Honoree	Jane the Virgin	Won	
2017	ACLU Social Bill of Rights Award	Honoree	Jane the Virgin	Won	
2017	Tell Tale Award	Best Actress	Jane the Virgin	Won	
2017	Tell Tale Award	Jane and Petra Friendship	Jane the Virgin	Won	
2018	MTV Award	Best Kiss (with Justin Baldoni)	Jane the Virgin	Nominated	
2018	Teen Choice Award	Choice TV Actress – Comedy	Jane the Virgin	Won	
2018	Teen Choice Award	Choice TV Liplock (with Justin Baldoni)	Jane the Virgin	Nominated	
2018	Tell Tale Award	Favorite Lead Actress in a Comedy Series	Jane the Virgin	Won	
2018	Eva Longoria Foundation Award	Honoree for Activism	Gina Rodriguez	Won	
2018	ALMA Award	Honoree Award	Jane the Virgin	Won	
2019			Jane the Virgin		
2019	TVLine Performance of the Week	Honoree	Jane the Virgin	Won	
2019	MTV Award	Best Performance in a Show	Jane the Virgin	Nominated	
2019	Imagen Award	Best Actress – Television	Jane the Virgin	Nominated	
2019	Teen Choice Award	Choice Comedy TV Actress	Jane the Virgin	Nominated	
2019	NAACP Image Award	Outstanding Directing in a Comedy Series ("Chapter Seventy-Four")	Jane the Virgin	Nominated	
2022	Children's and Family Emmy Awards	Outstanding Guest Performance	Diary of a Future President	Nominated	
2023	Children's and Family Emmy Awards	Outstanding Lead Performance	Lost Ollie	Nominated	

== See also ==
- Puerto Ricans in Chicago

Preceded by Trisha Gum	Voice of Velma Dinkley; 2020 film Scoob!	Succeeded by Ariana Greenblatt (2020)
