= Christian Garrett =

American basketball player and venture capitalist

Christian Garrett is a venture capitalist investor and the grandson of famed real estate and banking investor Bernard Garrett Sr. Garrett is a partner at 137 Ventures which has invested in SpaceX, Palantir, Uber, Anduril, Spotify, SolarCity, Gusto, Ramp, Hadrian, Impulse, and more. He is also the co-founder of The Hill & Valley Forum which has had Peter Thiel, Vinod Khosla, Jensen Huang, Alex Karp, Brian Schimpf, Shyam Sankar, Lisa Su, Trae Stephens, Young Liu, Vice President JD Vance, Secretary of Interior Doug Burgum, Secretary of Treasury Scott Bessent, Secretary of Energy Chris Wright, Secretary of Commerce Howard Lutnick, Senator Chris Coons, Senator Mark Warner, Congressman George Whitesides, Senator Jeanne Shaheen, Senator Cory Booker, Senator Todd Young, Congressman Gabe Amo, Senator Tim Scott, Congressman Ritchie Torres, and Former Senate Majority Leader Chuck Schumer all attend before.

Garrett played college basketball for the University of Kansas and went to the Final Four in 2012.

His mother is Cynthia Garrett who is the step sister of Lenny Kravitz.

Garrett is Italian-American, and is the co-founder of Amsterdam-based aerospace and defense company, Onodrim
