= Roofstock =

American financial technology company

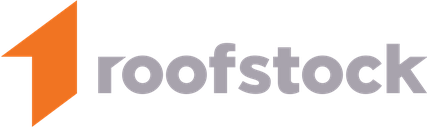
- Industry: Fintech; Marketplace; Rental Property
- Founded: 2015; 11 years ago
- Founder: Gary Beasley; Gregor Watson; Rich Ford
- Headquarters: Oakland
- Number of employees: 205
- Website: www.roofstock.com

Roofstock is an Oakland-based American Fin-tech startup founded by Gary Beasley who is the CEO, Gregor Watson is the Chairman and Rich Ford is the Chief Development Officer. The startup was established in 2015.

Roofstock is an online marketplace for investing in leased single-family rental homes. The company helps its clients by providing them with research, analytics, and insights to evaluate and purchase certified properties. The company pre-inspects rental properties with information about tenant, current rent, and property manager and makes this information accessible online. Users can compare investment properties around the country.

== History ==
Roofstock Marketplace was launched in 2016 and in 2017 the Roofstock Neighborhood Ratings was launched. It surpassed $1 billion in transactions in 2018. In July 2018, Roofstock acquired Streetlane, a Dallas-based single-family rental management company. In 2019, it surpassed $2 billion in transactions. In 2022, Roofstock bought RentPrep, which was led by Steve White, CEO and founder. In 2024, Roofstock launched Roofstock Capital Management.

Roofstock launched a neighborhood rating algorithm that analyzes more than 72,000 census tracts and ranks their risk. It includes factors like home values, average rent, income levels, employment rates, education levels, crime data, percentage of owner-occupied homes and school district ratings. Also, it ranks each neighborhood on a scale of 1 to 5, 1 being the most risky.

== Published research ==
Roofstock published Housing America: Single-Family Rental's Critical Role in U.S. Housing Infrastructure.

== Awards and accolades ==
- 2017: Was listed as Best Small & Medium Workplaces™ 2017
- 2018: Was listed as Best Small & Medium Workplaces™ 2018
- 2019: Won the HousingWire Tech100.
- 2019: Was named to the Forbes Most Innovative Fintech Companies list.
- 2019: Received the first ever Finovate Awards award for Best Alternative Investments Platform.
- 2019: Was listed as the Best Workplaces in the Bay Area™ 2019

== Fundings ==
- 2016: Received Series A funding of $13.3 Million from Khosla Ventures, Ron Conway, Marc Benioff, Bain Capital and others.
- 2016: Received Series B funding of $20 Million.
- 2017: Received Series C funding of $50 Million led by Canvas Ventures.
- 2020: Received Series D funding of $50 Million led by SVB Capital.
