= Diary of a Future President =

2020 American comedy television series

- Genre: Comedy drama
- Created by: Ilana Peña
- Starring: Tess Romero; Selenis Leyva; Charlie Bushnell; Michael Weaver; Gina Rodriguez
- Music by: Joey Newman
- Opening theme: "My Journey: Lo Puedo Lograr" by Emily Estefan
- Country of origin: United States
- Original language: English
- No. of seasons: 2
- No. of episodes: 20

Production
- Executive producers: Robin Shorr; Ilana Peña; Gina Rodriguez; Emily Gipson; Brad Silberling; Lewis Abel
- Production location: Los Angeles
- Cinematography: Alison Kelly
- Editors: Kyla Plewes; Keenan Hiett; Eric Lea; Scott Melendez
- Camera setup: Single-camera
- Running time: 22–28 minutes
- Production companies: I Can & I Will Productions; CBS Studios

Original release
- Network: Disney+
- Release: January 17, 2020 – August 18, 2021

Diary of a Future President is an American comedy-drama television series created by Ilana Peña for Disney+. Gina Rodriguez serves as an executive producer through her company I Can & I Will Productions, which produces the series in association with CBS Studios.

Told through a collection of voice-overs by central character Elena as she reads from her diary, the series centers on the 13-year-old Cuban American girl, who attends middle school as she aspires to be a future president of the United States. The series stars Tess Romero, Charlie Bushnell, Selenis Leyva and Michael Weaver. Rodriguez also appears through flashforwards as the adult version of Elena, as she serves as President of the United States.

The first season premiered on January 17, 2020. In May 2020, the series was renewed for a second season, which premiered on August 18, 2021, with all ten episodes. In December 2021, the series was canceled after two seasons.

The series was removed from Disney+ on May 26, 2023, amidst a Disney+ and Hulu content removal purge as part of a broader cost cutting initiative under Disney CEO Bob Iger.

== Premise ==
Elena is a 13-year-old Cuban American girl who attends middle school and must make her way through the personal and social pressures of adolescence. As the series is told through Elena's narration as written in her diary, it follows the daily events of her life and her interactions with friends and family. She lives with her older brother, Bobby; and mother, Gabi, who develops a new relationship with Sam, a lawyer from her firm. Elena has a strong desire to become a president of the United States, which is made visible through flashforwards to her tenure as President.

== Cast and characters ==
=== Main ===
- Tess Romero as Elena Cañero-Reed, a confident and strong-willed 13-year-old Cuban American girl with a desire to become a future president of the United States. In season one, Elena is a 6th grader; going into the second season, she is in 7th grade.
  - Gina Rodriguez as Future Elena Cañero-Reed, who is shown through flashforwards to be the future President of the United States. She has a more prominent role in the second season as a figment of Elena's imagination.
- Selenis Leyva as Gabriela "Gabi" Cañero-Reed, Elena's widowed mother who works as a lawyer.
- Charlie Bushnell as Roberto "Bobby" Cañero-Reed, Elena's rage inducing older brother who is coming to terms with his sexuality.
- Michael Weaver as Sam Faber, a lawyer at Gabi's firm who she develops a new relationship with.

=== Recurring ===
- Carmina Garay as Sasha, Elena's best friend
- Sanai Victoria as Melissa, Elena and Sasha's former rival who "stole" their best friend, Jessica
- Jessica Marie Garcia as Camila, a paralegal and Gabi's close friend, who is scared to come out to her parents that she has a girlfriend.
- Harmeet Pandey as Jessica, Elena's former best friend who is now friends with Melissa. In season 2 she becomes friends with Elena and Sasha again.
- Avantika Vandanapu as Monyca with a 'Y' (season 1), Bobby's ex-girlfriend.
- Brandon Severs as Liam, Bobby's teammate and friend for whom Bobby has feelings
- Nathan Arenas as Danny, a teammate and a friend of Bobby and Liam
- Gregg Binkley as Dr. Cooper, the school's Vice Principal
- Ellie Reed as Danielle, Camila's fiancé
- Tony Espinosa as Emilio (season 2), a transfer student who runs for student rep alongside Elena
- Donovin Miller as CJ (season 2), a high school junior with whom Bobby becomes romantically involved

=== Notable guests ===
- Rachel Bloom as Ms. Wexler, an English teacher who catches Elena and Sasha shopping in an intimates store.
- Melissa Fumero as Ms. Ortega, a drama teacher who produces a musical about Miami and casts Sasha as the lead
- Michael Hitchcock as Thomas, a man who gets rear ended when Gabi teaches Bobby how to drive.

== Episodes ==
=== Series overview ===
Season	Episodes	Originally released	
Season	Episodes	First released	Last released
1	10	January 17, 2020	March 20, 2020
2	10	August 18, 2021	

=== Season 1 (2020) ===
No. overall	No. in season	Title	Directed by	Written by	Original release date
1	1	"Hello World"	Gina Rodriguez	Ilana Peña	January 17, 2020
Before her first address as President, Elena receives her old middle school diary and starts going through it. In the first entry, she feels betrayed by her former best friend Jessica who is now friends with Melissa, Elena's rival. Jessica and Melissa brag about having synchronized menstrual cycles, and mock Elena for not being mature enough to have her first period. Later, Elena discovers Jessica has been lying about having periods. Jessica begs Elena not to tell anyone; despite everything Jessica did, Elena decides not to reveal her secret. Meanwhile, Elena's mother Gabi isn't ready to tell her children that she is dating Sam. When Camila advises her to tell them, Gabi changes the subject by pointing out that Camila hasn't come out yet to her parents. However, Bobby and Elena discover Gabi's secret when they see her kissing Sam.
2	2	"The New Deal"	Angela Tortu	Ilana Peña & Robin Shorr	January 24, 2020
Elena confronts her mother for not telling her about dating Sam. She tries to get along with him but when Sam starts doing things Elena would normally do around the house, Elena feels as if she's being replaced. After asking Jessica why she replaced her as a friend, Elena concludes that her family would never replace her. However, when she finds Gabi talking about literature with Sam, she storms off to return the donuts she had bought earlier. When the speaker at the drive-through window calls her Lenny, Elena becomes convinced that she's talking to her late father. She admits that she's scared of change. Gabi arrives and assures Elena that she's irreplaceable. She also helps Elena realize that her reaction to change is a normal part of grief.
3	3	"Disaster Relief"	Sam Bailey	Hailey Chavez	January 31, 2020
When Sasha convinces Elena that everyone has their own reason for being, Elena becomes determined to find her thing. She tries different things without luck. When a spot for a hurricane watch captain opens up, she works very hard for it but loses it to Ryan, a popular football player who just wants it for the captain hat. Elena later realizes that her passion is doing the school announcements. Meanwhile, Bobby's popularity surges after becoming a tennis captain. When a girl named Monyca asks him to meet her behind a dumpster, Bobby's friends convince him that she wants to make out. They start practising how to unstrap a bra but when Gabi catches them, she cancels her plans with Sam to give him the sex talk. Gabi explains to Sam that dating her means having to deal with the children because they are her reason for being.
4	4	"The National Mall"	Erin Ehrlich	Brig Muñoz-Liebowitz	February 7, 2020
Tired of being made fun of by Melissa and Jessica for being little girls, Elena and Sasha set out to prove that they're mature by sneaking into an adult mall to look at bras and underwear. After running into their teacher holding a thong, they feel embarrassed and, in the confusion, Elena accidentally runs out with a bra. The guilt of shoplifting haunts her until she decides to return the bra and make things right. Bobby and Monyca are struggling to find privacy so that they can make out. So, their friends help them out by organizing a kissing game. However, after the kiss, Bobby feels insecure and inexperienced. Meanwhile, Sam questions whether he's ready to handle the responsibility that comes with dating Gabi and being like a father to her children. He gains confidence in himself after helping Elena return the bra. Later in the bathroom, feeling confident and mature, Elena gets her period and calls for her mother.
5	5	"Whistleblower"	Angela Tortu	Michael Jonathan Smith	February 14, 2020
Gabi welcomes Elena to womanhood by preparing a meal to celebrate Elena's first period. After learning about Gabi's case to protect Waveline workers, Elena feels inspired to become a strong woman fighting for change like her mother. So, she becomes determined to change the school mascot Swansby after learning that Swansby was a man who used to degrade women. She and Sasha gather the needed signatures but are disappointed to learn that it will take months to be reviewed by the board. Unable to wait that long, Elena decides to pour a bucket of orange juice on the mascot during Bobby's tennis match. Unfortunately, it backfires when the mascot uses Jessica as a human shield. Later, Gabi helps Elena realize that change takes time. Meanwhile, Bobby is glad to finally have his last name spelled right (with ñ instead of n) on the tennis uniform. However, a boy from the rival team makes him feel insecure by making fun of the accent mark on his name.
6	6	"Habeas Corpus"	Fernando Sariñana	Hugh Moore	February 21, 2020
Elena is serving a week of detention for chucking orange juice on Jessica during her mascot protest. Jessica makes fun of Elena only to realize that Melissa has ended their friendship after finding out that she's been lying about her period. On her first day, Elena avoids the "Six O'Clockers" - a group of students with bad reputations for getting detention regularly. The next day, she talks to them only to realize that all the bad rumors about them are false. They're just victims of circumstances. She befriends them and sits with them at lunch the next day. Later that day, Elena loses a debate when her credibility is questioned for hanging out with the Six O'Clockers. So, she starts avoiding being seen with them publicly. However, when she gets an early release for good behavior, Elena stands up for the Six O'Clockers and uses the morning announcements to help people see them for who they really are. Meanwhile, while watching a terrible but funny movie with his friends, Bobby gets uncomfortable because it reminds him of his father's death.
7	7	"Foreign Relations"	Viet Nguyen	LaDarian Smith	February 28, 2020
Elena wants her long-time crush Joey to ask her to the middle-school dance but he wants to go with an eighth grade girl. So, Elena starts spying on eighth grade girls so that she can act and look like them. As a result, she forgets to be there for Sasha who needed her help preparing for a public poetry reading. Their ex-friend, Jessica, steps in to help Sasha. After a humiliating fall and a talk with an eighth grader, Elena decides to be herself and asks Joey out. She later remembers about Sasha but it's too late since Sasha is now spending time with Jessica. Meanwhile, after going for a tennis tournament, Bobby and his friend Liam are stuck in a storage closet. At first, Bobby is frustrated but Liam helps him relax. He starts showing potential feelings towards Liam just before they're rescued. Elsewhere, Gabi thinks she's ready to donate her late husband's things but after seeing an old photo of them together, she realizes that she's not ready to move on.
8	8	"Matters of Diplomacy"	Kacie Anning	Robin Shorr & Jessica Gonzalez	March 6, 2020
While preparing for the middle school dance, Elena notices that she's developing a mustache. She calls Sasha for help but Sasha is still upset because Elena abandoned her during the poetry reading. Sasha is preparing to go to the dance with Jessica but lies to Elena that she has a dentist appointment. After many failed attempts to clear the mustache and its burns, Elena gives up and decides to embrace it. At the dance, she confronts Sasha for choosing Jessica over her but Sasha calls her out for being selfish. Meanwhile, Bobby wants to go to the dance with Liam instead of his girlfriend, Monyca. So, he organizes for his friends to go as a group. However, when he sees Liam dancing with a girl, he becomes jealous and starts a fight. He is forced to leave the dance and join his sister who had walked out after her fight with Sasha. Elsewhere, Sam is excited to meet Gabi's mother and her extended family but Gabi is still not ready.
9	9	"State of the Union"	Melanie Mayron	Hailey Chavez & Jerrica Long	March 13, 2020
Elena is looking forward to a class trip to Tallahassee where she and Sasha had planned to be roommates. She thinks Sasha will apologize first but Sasha refuses and chooses Jessica as her roommate. Elena intentionally misses the bus to avoid the awkwardness. However, since Gabi is trying to avoid Sam after their disastrous family dinner, she volunteers to take Elena to Tallahassee. On the way, Gabi convinces Elena to apologize to Sasha, and Elena convinces her to talk to Sam. Upon arrival, Elena apologizes and Sasha forgives her. Meanwhile, Bobby is staying with Camila and her girlfriend, Danielle. Since Camila knows Bobby has feelings for Liam, she hopes he will come out to them but he is not ready. Camila herself hasn't come out to her parents yet which helps Bobby understand that coming out is a process. So, he breaks up with Monyca as part of his process of figuring things out. Monyca understands because she had already noticed that Bobby likes Liam more than her.
10	10	"Two Party System"	Gina Lamar	Ilana Peña	March 20, 2020
Elena, Sasha and Jessica are throwing a party during their Tallahassee trip. When Melissa convinces Jessica to turn it into an invite-only party, Elena and Sasha throw their own inclusive party. Everyone attends their party, leaving Jessica alone. Elena feels bad for Jessica and convinces her to join her party. After the party, Jessica makes up with Elena and Sasha. Back at home, Bobby is struggling to figure out how to tell Liam that he likes him. He texts Liam but after meeting up, he gets scared and changes the subject. Meanwhile, Gabi had asked Sam for a break because she still loves her late husband, but Bobby convinces her that she can love them both because Sam is not replacing Robert. Upon returning home, Elena says that she's been inspired by a senator she met in Tallahassee to fight for inclusivity. She becomes interested in politics and decides to run for student council. In the future, Elena makes her first presidential speech, addressing diversity and inclusivity.

=== Season 2 (2021) ===
No. overall	No. in season	Title	Directed by	Written by	Original release date
11	1	"Back In Session"	Gina Rodriguez	Ilana Peña	August 18, 2021
Elena thinks she has it all figured out, but soon realizes that's not the case.
12	2	"Strategic Alliance"	Rachel Raimist	Ali Schouten	August 18, 2021
Elena joins the school play to spend time with Sasha, but is dismayed when Claude also signs up.
13	3	"Pleading the Fifth"	Patricia Cardoso	Jessica Gonzalez	August 18, 2021
Elena enlists her Ñeñe (and Gabi's mother) Francisca to help get her mom off her back.
14	4	"United Nations"	Morenike Joela Evans	Sasha Stroman	August 18, 2021
Elena gets a lower-than-expected grade on a test and tries to get her grades up.
15	5	"The National Stage"	Angela Tortu	Danny Fernandez	August 18, 2021
After Bobby's speech, he is selected to be Mr. Manatee. While rehearsing in front of a crowd, Sasha gets stage fright and ask Elena to be the lead. Bobby's friends try to help him get a date for the Mr. Manatee dance. Gabi feels left out by the kids and offers them to get their outfits for the Manatee dance and the school play. While shopping, Bobby reveals to Elena that he is gay. Elena realizes that it is wrong for her to be the lead and gives the role back to Sasha, and helps her overcome her stage fright. Bobby sends his school an email, and they cancel the Mr. Manatee dance. After the play, Elena decides to run for student representative.
16	6	"Brain Trust"	Gina Lamar	Max Maduka	August 18, 2021
Gabi wants to help Elena with her campaign speech and Winter Carnival booth. Elena has other ideas.
17	7	"Quid Pro Quo"	Diego Velasco	Crystal Ferreiro	August 18, 2021
Elena and her campaign squad, look at her ratings and try to figure out how to get more votes. When seeing 6th graders fall, Elena is told that the school is replacing lockers for a vending machine. When Gabi is out of town, and Sam at a poker game, Elena and Bobby throw a party. Camilla tells Gabi that she plans on proposing to Danielle, and Gabi makes a comment which causes a dilemma. While at the party, Elena tries to talk to the former representative to take down the vending machines, in exchange the other representative wants a date with Bobby. Trying to impress his new friends Bobby kicks out Liam and Danny. When Sam returns home, a partygoer reveals that Elena and Bobby threw a party.
18	8	"Supreme Court Injustice"	Crystle Roberson	Alyssa Lerner	August 18, 2021
Elena creates a new rebellious internet persona and loses herself a little in the process.
19	9	"First Gentleman"	Ilana Peña	Ranada C. Shepard	August 18, 2021
At a sleepover, Elena's friends reveal that they all have had their first kiss. Bobby apologizes to his friends and tells Danny that he is gay. Elena's crush Joey, ask her to help him writes a speech for his bar mitzvah. Bobby tries to get Sam to teach him how to drive, which Gabi shuts down, but changes her mind and teach him. While helping Joey, Elena is invited to his Bar mitzvah. While teaching Bobby how to drive, he accidentally hits a car. At Joey's bar mitzvah, Elena has her first kiss with Joey. During his speech, it is revealed that he stole her speech for class representative. While bonding with Gabi, Bobby tells her that he is gay.
20	10	"October Surprise"	Gordon Freeman	Ilana Peña & Victoria González	August 18, 2021
Bobby struggles on how to ask CJ out, and ask his friends to help him. When Elena arrives at school, she learns that the Swansby statue has been ordered to be removed. Tripp turns the students against Elena and makes her lose votes. Gabi and Sam are shown Elena's videos talking bad about Gabi. While seeking help from Camilla, Bobby builds up the courage to ask CJ out, and Camilla accidentally reveals she wants to propose and Danielle overhears. While on his date, Bobby and CJ kiss and start a relationship. Elena tries to fix her relationship with Gabi, and wants Gabi to read her diary. Gabi says no, and wants to have a trusting relationship with Elena. While telling his friends about his date, Danny reveals Bobby's former crush, and Liam becomes suspicious. Instead of writing a speech Elena, ask the students to share what they want to see change. After the votes end, Elena is shocked by the results.

== Production ==
=== Development ===
On January 31, 2019, it was announced that Disney+ had ordered a ten episode first season of a new single-camera comedy, which was originally titled Diary of a Female President. It was reported that the series was created by Ilana Peña, who would also serve as an executive producer alongside Gina Rodriguez and Emily Gipson. Robin Shorr was expected to be involved as the showrunner. The series is produced by Rodriguez's company I Can & I Will in association with CBS Studios, who sold the broadcasting rights to Disney. CBS chief creative officer David Nevins stated that the series was considered to air on The CW, but that it was more ultimately more suitable for the target audience of Disney+. The program was the first scripted series produced by an external studio to be ordered by Disney+. In December 2019, it was revealed that the program's titled had changed to Diary of a Future President. On May 29, 2020, Disney+ renewed the series for a second season. On July 12, 2021, it was revealed that the second season would premiere a month later on August 18, along with the release of a short first look of the season. On December 13, 2021, Disney+ canceled the series after two seasons.

=== Writing ===
The series represents a Latino family, with Elena being referred to as Cuban American in character descriptions. Rodriguez stated that she established her production company in an effort to express stories "for and by the underrepresented". The series has been stated to be inspired by Peña's own childhood.

=== Casting ===
In July 2019, executive producer Rodriguez was announced to be playing the adult version of Elena, who appears in flashforwards as she undertakes her political campaign. Rodriguez was also revealed to be directing the first episode of the series. It was also announced that Tess Romero and Charlie Bushnell would be playing siblings Elena and Bobby respectively, while Selenis Leyva was cast as their mother, Gabi; and Michael Weaver as her love interest, Sam.

=== Filming ===
Production on the first season began in July 2019 in Los Angeles. It was originally expected that the season would film from June to September. The second season began filming in October 2020, after multiple delays due to the COVID-19 pandemic.

== Release ==
The first episode was released on the streaming service Disney+, in the United States and internationally on January 17, 2020, in 4K HDR. Episodes were released weekly. All ten episodes of the second season were released on August 18, 2021.

=== Marketing ===
The first poster was released on December 16, 2019, alongside details of the first two episodes. The first trailer for the series was released on January 6, 2020, with an additional poster also revealed.

== Reception ==
=== Audience viewership ===
According to Whip Media, Diary of a Future President was the 3rd rising show, based on the week-over-week growth in episodes watched for a specific program, during the week of August 22, 2021.

=== Critical response ===
On the review aggregator website Rotten Tomatoes, the show's first season holds an approval rating of 100% based on 5 reviews.

Daniel Fienberg of The Hollywood Reporter complimented how the series manages to focus on different aspects of adolescence, while praising the performances of the cast and its diversity. Brian Lowry of CNN compared the series to Jack & Bobby for its premise, stated that Diary of a Future President manages to skillfully approach Tess Romero's character's process of living through adolescence, while finding Romero's performance very well executed. Emily Ashby of Common Sense Media rated the show 3 out of 5 stars, found the depiction of self-assurance and positivity across Romero's character inspirational, and complimented the diversity among the cast members.

=== Accolades ===
Year	Award	Category	Nominee(s)	Result	Ref.
2020	Imagen Foundation Awards	Best Young Actor - Television	Tess Romero	Nominated	
2020	Imagen Foundation Awards	Best Music Composition for Film or TV	Joey Newman	Nominated	
2020	Imagen Foundation Awards	Best Music Supervision for Film or TV	Janet Lopez	Nominated	
2021	Gracie Awards	Actress in a Supporting Role - Musical or Comedy	Selenis Leyva	Won	
2022	GLAAD Media Award	Outstanding Kids & Family Programming	Diary of a Future President	Nominated	
2022	Young Artist Awards	Best Performance in a Streaming Series Role: Teen Actor	Brogan Hall	Nominated	
2022	Young Artist Awards	Best Performance in a Streaming Series Role: Teen Actress	Dariana Alvarez	Won	
2022	Young Artist Awards	Best Performance in a Streaming Series Role: Teen Actress	Jessica Mikayla	Nominated	
2022	Children's and Family Emmy Awards	Outstanding Guest Performance in Preschool, Children's or Young Teen Program	Gina Rodriguez	Nominated	
