= Taylor Black =

American actress (born 1991)

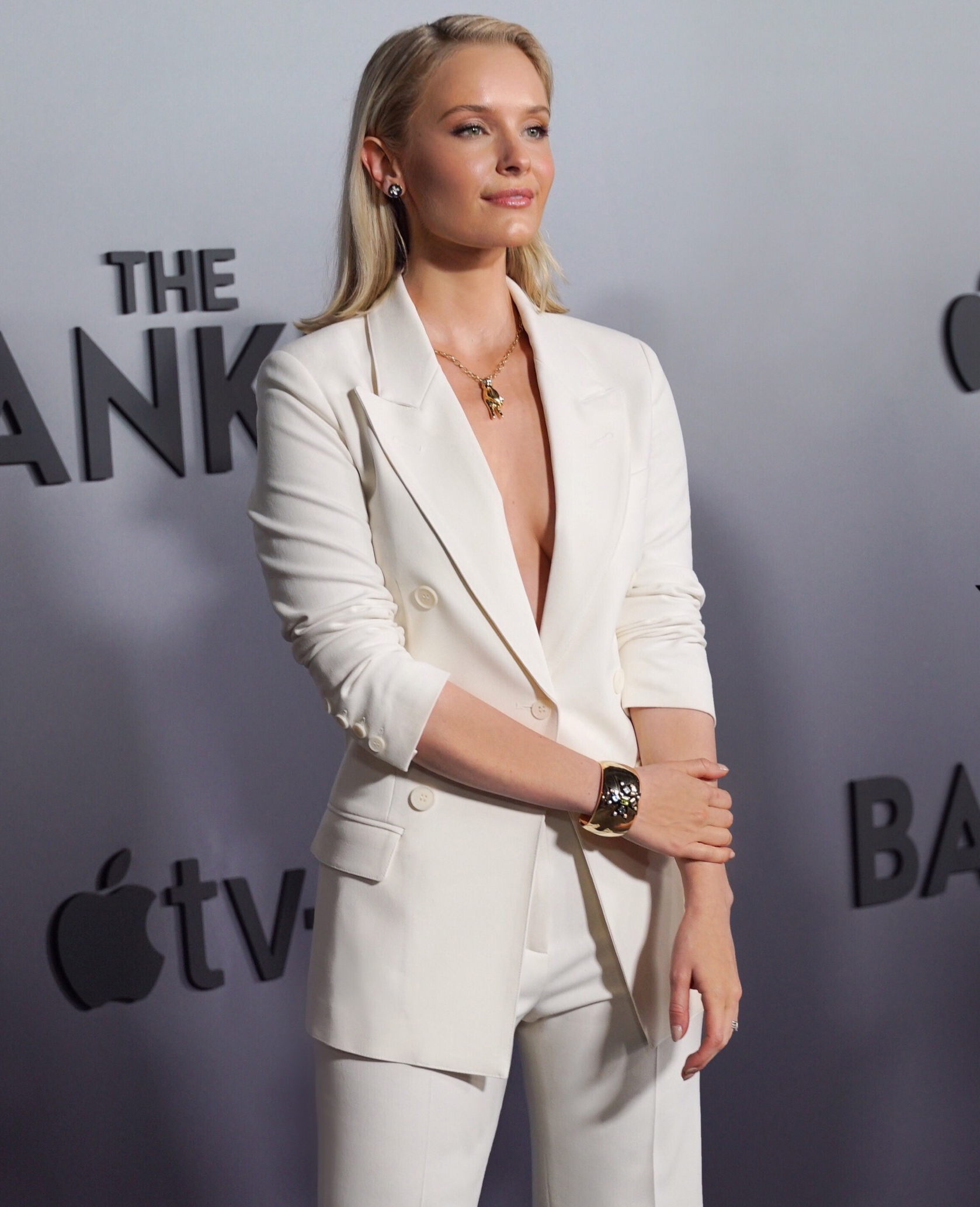
- Black at the 2020 premiere of The Banker
- Born: Taylor Rene Gildersleeve; September 13, 1991 (age 35)
- Education: Columbia University
- Occupations: Actress, producer, director
- Years active: 2005–2021
- Spouse: Bradley Livingstone Black (m. 2015)
- Children: 2
- Website: taylorblackofficial.com

Taylor Black (born September 13, 1991) is an American former actress, producer and model. Credited by her birth name, Taylor Gildersleeve, until 2015, she may be best known for her role, while a teenager, as Sydney Harris on the soap opera All My Children (2005—2006), or as the 2009 Miss New York Teen USA. Her last screen role was a guest appearance on a 2021 episode of Magnum P.I., after which she has focused on running Black Tandem, a creative arts company she and her husband founded in Los Angeles.

== Early life ==
Taylor Rene Gildersleeve was born and raised in Mattituck, on the North Fork of Long Island, New York. After graduating from Mattituck High School, she attended Columbia University and graduated with a degree in film studies, concentrating in production.

== Career ==
=== 2005–2012 ===
In 2005, while still in high school, she auditioned for the role of Colby Chandler in All My Children and instead was offered the role of teenager Sydney Harris. Her character's story spanned 38 episodes and ended in June 2007. She also started appearing in a series of commercials, and guest starred in a 2008 episode of Law & Order. She took a hiatus from acting to concentrate on high school and to enter pageantry competition; she was crowned Miss New York Teen USA in March 2009, and went on to compete in the Miss Teen USA 2009 pageant in July.

In 2010, when she started her college studies at Columbia in New York City, she also returned to acting, making brief guest appearances in single episodes of five different series produced in the city, including 30 Rock, One Life To Live, Gossip Girl and NYC22. She also appeared in several episodes of Late Night with Jimmy Fallon as Fallon’s "assistant" and was a judge on the panel for Reel Teens 2010, choosing the teen who would feature in that fall's campaign for Aéropostale. In 2012 she played Blake, the co-lead of the Lorne Michaels web series Cool Kid’s Table, where she hosted and spoofed celebrities.

=== 2013–2015: Film and television ===
In 2013, Black made her feature film debut as an unnamed character in Ass Backwards which was premiered at Sundance, followed by her first named film character, appearing as Summer in Sleeping with the Fishes. Her television work also increased during 2013, including nine episodes in MTV's sketch comedy series Hey Girl, Anna McGraw in the CBS series Unforgettable, Kippy Cook in The CW's Cheerleader Death Squad, and Laura Gorman in MTV’s One Bad Choice. In 2014, she appeared as Beth in the film Affluenza, and starred in the Lifetime's television movie Sugar Daddies. She had the supporting role of Kristin in the film ADDicted. In 2016, she guest starred as Laura Mahoney in David Schwimmer's AMC series, Feed the Beast and Jane in the Hulu series Deadbeat.

=== 2015–present: Black Tandem and mainstream projects ===
In 2015, Black married the artist Bradley Livingstone Black; they have two children together. Their production company, Black Tandem, operates from Los Angeles. Their short film Helen of Troy (2017) was filmed on location in Paris and in Upstate New York. It enjoyed a successful festival run highlighted by its international premiere at the Bermuda International Film Festival in 2018, and ended in the United States at the TCL Chinese Theater in Hollywood as part of the HollyShorts Film Festival in 2019. Beginning in 2017, Black became the face of the Swiss jewellery line, Nana Fink.

From 2015 to 2018, she mostly appeared in guest roles in single episodes of various television series, including CBS's Criminal Minds: Beyond Borders and Fox' Lucifer, and a three episode run on NBC's Midnight, Texas. Over 2019 and 2020, she had recurring roles as Ashley Cunningham in The CW's Dynasty and Emma Mitchell on Sony/Spectrum's L.A.'s Finest and also appeared in Woody Allen's film A Rainy Day in New York as well as the supporting lead role of Susie Steiner in Apple TV+'s streaming film The Banker, her last major film role. Her last appearance was a guest episode of Magnum P.I., in 2021.

== Philanthropy ==
While in high school, Black's charitable work included the Make a Wish Foundation, Teens Against Cancer and volunteering for Cardinal McCloskey Services. As an adult, she has worked with the Children's Hospital Los Angeles and has been a patron of Ganna Walska Lotusland botanical gardens in Montecito, California.

== Filmography ==
=== Film ===
Year	Title	Role	Notes
2013	Sleeping with the Fishes	Summer	
2014	Affluenza	Beth	
2014	Sugar Daddies	Kara Jones	
2017	ADDicted	Kristin	
2018	The Big Take	Edie	
2019	A Rainy Day in New York	Dana	
2020	The Banker	Susie Steiner	

=== Television ===
Year	Title	Role	Notes
2005–2006	All My Children	Sydney Harris	Recurring role, 38 episodes
2008	Law & Order	Lauren Claiborne	season 19, episode 6
2010	30 Rock	Archeria	season 4, episode 10
2010	One Life to Live	Leah Vallaria	2 episodes
2010	Gossip Girl	Tiffani	season 4, episode 1
2012	NYC 22	Sasha	season 1, episode 8
2012	Person of Interest	Gabi	season 2, episode 3
2013–2014	Hey Girl	Christina	Recurring role
2014	Unforgettable	Anna McGraw	season 3, episode 2
2015	Cheerleader Death Squad	Kippy Cook	Unsold television pilot
2015	One Bad Choice	Laura Gorman	season 1, episode 6
2016	Deadbeat	Jane	season 3, episode 4
2016	Feed the Beast	Laura Mahoney	season 1, episode 4
2017	Criminal Minds: Beyond Borders	Lauren Barrett	season 2, episode 4
2017	Midnight, Texas	Gina	season 1, episodes 2-4
2018	Lucifer	Misty Canyons	season 3, episode 11
2019	Dynasty	Ashley Cunningham	Recurring role (seasons 2–3)
2020	L.A.'s Finest	Emma Mitchell	Recurring role (season 2)
2021	Magnum P.I.	Erin Bates	season 3, episode 10

=== As a producer ===
Year	Title	Notes
2016	Les Falaises	Filmed in Normandy, France
2017	Helen of Troy	Filmed in France and New York

== Awards and nominations ==
Year	Award	Category	Work	Result
2009	Miss Teen USA	Miss New York Teen USA Pageant	Contestant	Won
