= Filly Brown =

- Theatrical release poster
- Directed by: Youssef Delara; Michael D. Olmos
- Written by: Youssef Delara
- Produced by: Edward James Olmos
- Starring: Gina Rodriguez; Jenni Rivera; Emilio Rivera; Noel G.; Kerry Norton; Braxton Millz; Joseph Julian Soria; Chrissie Fit; Lou Diamond Phillips; Edward James Olmos
- Cinematography: Ben Kufrin
- Edited by: Eric R. Brodeur; Youssef Delara
- Music by: Reza Safinia
- Production companies: Cima Productions; Olmos Productions; Silent Giant Entertainment
- Distributed by: Indomina Releasing; Pantelion Films (through Lionsgate)
- Release dates: January 20, 2012 (Sundance); April 19, 2013 (United States)
- Running time: 101 minutes
- Country: United States
- Language: English
- Budget: $2 million
- Box office: $2.9 million

Filly Brown is a 2012 drama film directed by Youssef Delara and Michael D. Olmos. It was nominated for the Grand Jury Prize at the 2012 Sundance Film Festival and won Best Feature Film at the 2013 Noor Iranian Film Festival.

The whole cast won the Special Achievement in Film award at the 2013 American Latino Media Arts Awards, or ALMA Award. The late Jenni Rivera was honored with a moment of silence. This was Rivera's first and only film before her death on December 9, 2012.

== Cast ==
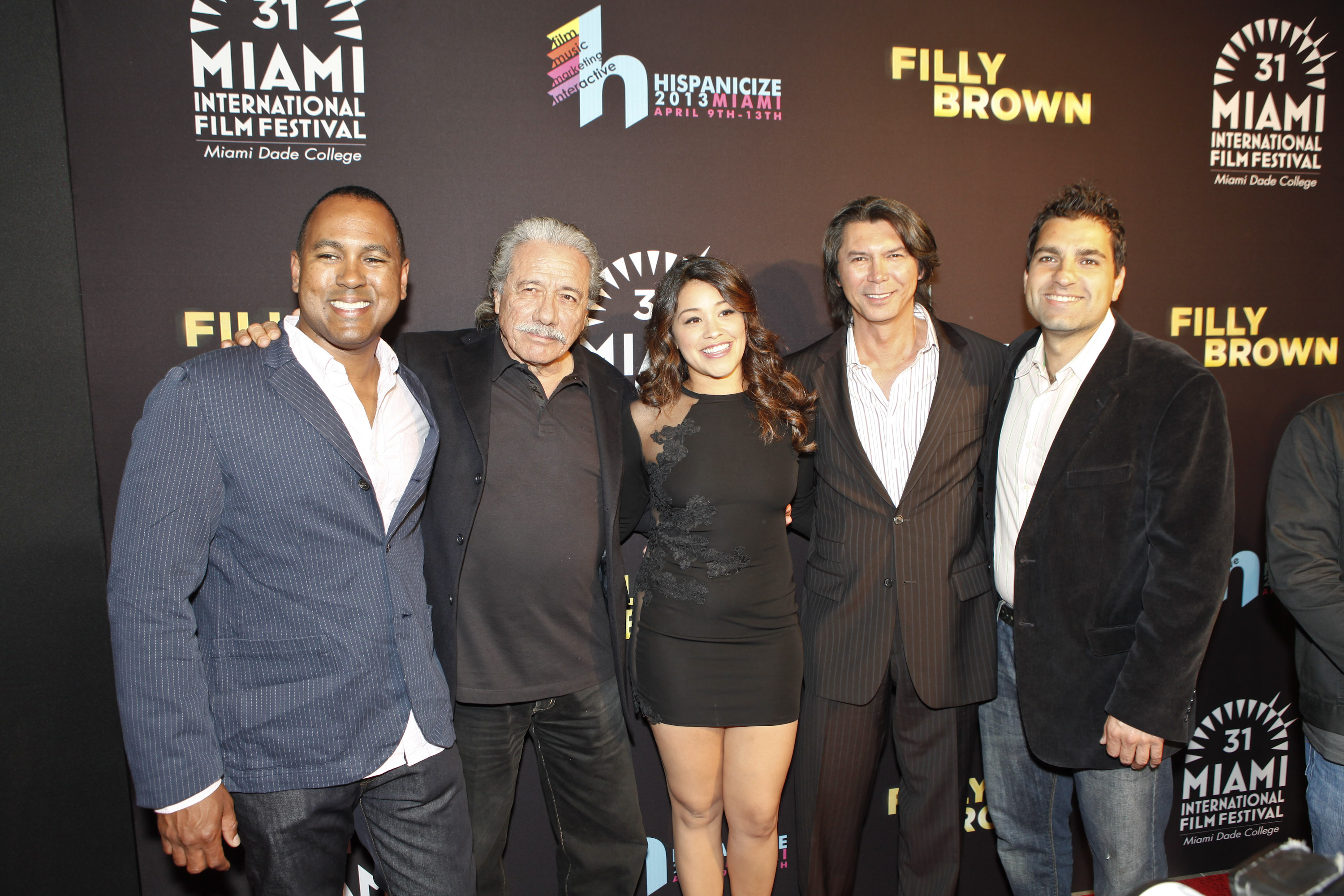
Cast & crew at the Miami International Film Festival premiere. From left: Michael D. Olmos, Edward James Olmos, Gina Rodriguez, Lou Diamond Phillips and Youssef Delara

- Gina Rodriguez as María José “Majo” Tenorio
- Jenni Rivera as María Tenorio
- Lou Diamond Phillips as José Tenorio
- Edward James Olmos as Leandro
- Emilio Rivera as Mani
- Noel Gugliemi as Big Cee
- Baby Bash as Caeser

== Reception ==
On review aggregator website Rotten Tomatoes, the film holds an approval rating of 45% based on 11 reviews, and an average rating of 5.5/10. On Metacritic, the film has a weighted average score of 57 out of 100, based on 7 critics, indicating "mixed or average" reviews.
