= Instant buyer =

Real estate transaction model

Instant buyer (or iBuyer) is a real estate transaction model wherein companies purchase residential properties directly from private sellers, to eventually re-sell them.

== Background ==
The term ‘instant’ refers to the fact that this type of business aims to provide a faster cash offer on a property than traditional real estate brokers. Valuation of the property takes place online and is an instantaneous or near-instantaneous process which makes use of machine learning and AI technologies. Examples of companies using the iBuyer model include Opendoor and ibuyhomes.com. The term iBuyer was coined by Stephen Kim, an equity research analyst at Evercore ISI on May 29, 2017 in a report to clients titled "The Rise of the iBuyer".

== The iBuyer process ==
iBuyer companies use computer-generated analysis of market data, information supplied by sellers, and in some cases input from local real estate agents, to make instant cash offers on residential properties. Individuals wishing to sell their house are asked to enter basic information about the property on a company’s website. In a process largely driven by machine learning and automated data analysis, the property’s approximate value is determined and an initial offer is made. If the offer is accepted by the seller, the company arranges an inspection of the property to ensure that the data supplied is concomitant with the actual condition of the building. From a seller’s perspective, the process of selling his or her property can take under two weeks.

Once an iBuyer company has purchased a property, it arranges for any necessary repairs or modifications to be carried out in the building. The property is then re-sold.

Businesses operating under the iBuyer transaction model make their profit on the fees incurred on the seller, which are typically marginally higher (1-4%) than those charged by traditional real estate companies. From an Instant buyer company’s perspective, the higher fees cover the investment risk involved in holding the property for a potentially long period of time. For a seller, the fees are paid in exchange for a much faster property-selling process than with a traditional real estate model and for avoiding the need to make repairs and improvements to the property prior to selling.
