= Anya (2019 film) =

- Directed by: Jacob Akira Okada; Carylanna Taylor
- Written by: Carylanna Taylor; Jacob Akira Okada
- Produced by: Stacey Davis; Jacob Akira Okada; Roger Schwartz; Carylanna Taylor
- Starring: Ali Ahn; Gil Perez-Abraham; Motell Gyn Foster
- Cinematography: Jacob Akira Okada
- Edited by: Jacob Akira Okada; Carylanna Taylor
- Music by: Jon Irabagon
- Production company: First Encounter Productions
- Distributed by: Giant Pictures
- Release date: November 26, 2019
- Country: United States
- Language: English

Anya (stylized as ANYA) is a 2019 science fiction film directed by Jacob Akira Okada and Carylanna Taylor. It features actors Ali Ahn, Gil Perez-Abraham, and Motell Gyn Foster. The film follows a couple struggling with infertility issues as they discover some unique genetic traits related to an immigrant group from the fictional island of Narval.

== Production ==
Anya revolves around the topics of genetics and anthropology, director Carylanna Taylor has a background as an anthropologist and Harvard researcher Ruth McCole served as scientific consultant. The genetic lab scenes in the film were shot in the real Dr. Andreas Pfenning’s genetics lab at Carnegie Mellon University in Pittsburgh.

== Synopsis ==
Libby desperately wants a child, but has had trouble conceiving and has suffered multiple miscarriages. Her partner Marco believes that the issues stem from him, as he is convinced that he is suffering from an ancient curse that was placed on all of the people from his island. Nevertheless, he agrees to visit a geneticist with Libby to determine the issue. They are both shocked when they discover that the reason they cannot have children is because Marco's genetics differ to the point where he can be considered a different species. Each would be able to have a baby with their own kind, but together conceiving would be practically impossible.

== Cast ==
- Ali Ahn as Libby
- Gil Perez-Abraham as Marco
- Izzabella Timonera as Anya
- Motell Gyn Foster as Dr. Seymour Livingston
- Anthony Aguilar as Aquiles
- Mary Theresa Archbold as Terry
- Diego A. Arellano as Hector
- Ana Maria Jomolca as Sara
- Ana Kayne as Fausta
- Olivia Oguma as Rika Endo
- Barbara Rosenblat as Dr. Rosalind Pfenning

== Critical reception ==
On review aggregator Rotten Tomatoes, Anya holds an approval rating of 93% based on 14 reviews, with an average rating of 6.6/10. Film Inquiry called it "ambitious" and praised the chemistry between the main characters. Film Frenzy found the film "intriguing" and also noted the performances, but found the score "unnecessary and overbearing". Film Threat said Anya is "a good conversation starter at parties" in relation to its ideas about genetics and humanity but found the story frustrating at times.
