= Opendoor =

American real estate company

Opendoor Technologies Inc.
- Type: Public
- Traded as: Nasdaq: OPEN; Russell 2000 component
- Industry: Real estate development; Property management; Real estate
- Founded: March 2014; 12 years ago
- Founders: Keith Rabois; Eric Wu; Ian Wong; JD Ross
- Headquarters: San Francisco, California, U.S.
- Key people: Kaz Nejatian Kaz Nejatian(CEO); Eric Jackson (Key Investor)
- Revenue: ▼US$5.15 billion (2024)
- Operating income: ▲US$−320 million (2024)
- Net income: ▼US$−392 million (2024)
- Total assets: ▼US$3.13 billion (2024)
- Total equity: ▼US$713 million (2024)
- Number of employees: 1,100 (2025)
- Website: opendoor.com

Opendoor Technologies Inc. is an online company that buys and sells residential real estate. Headquartered in San Francisco, it makes instant cash offers on homes through an online process, makes repairs on the properties it purchases and re-lists them for sale. It also provides mobile application-based home buying services along with financing. As of November 2021, the company operates in 44 markets in the US.

== History ==
The company was founded in March 2014 by serial entrepreneurs Keith Rabois, Eric Wu, who previously founded Movity, a real-estate startup acquired by Trulia, and JD Ross, now a co-founder at With Coverage. After raising a $9.95m venture capital round led by Khosla Ventures in May 2014, the company began operations. In 2018, Opendoor raised $400m in funding from the SoftBank Group Vision Fund. In 2019, it raised $300m in a funding round led by General Atlantic. At the time, the enterprise valuation was $3.8b.

In August 2019, Opendoor launched mortgage services through Opendoor Home Loans, an in-house mortgage business. In September 2019, it acquired national title and escrow company OS National, allowing integration of title, escrow and closing services under its business offerings.

In early 2020, Opendoor expanded services to more cities in partnership with Redfin. Later, the company laid off 600 employees, which made up 35% of its team, partially due to business impact from the COVID-19 shutdown. In March, Opendoor announced they would suspend home buying during the COVID-19 pandemic out of concerns for the safety of their customers. The company resumed its operations in May 2020 by introducing a contact-free platform to help people buy and sell homes digitally.

On April 27, 2020, Social Capital Hedosophia Holdings Corp II, a special-purpose acquisition company steered by Chamath Palihapitiya, commenced trading on the New York Stock Exchange.

On September 15, 2020, Social Capital Hedosophia Holdings Corp II announced its intention to merge with Opendoor. The deal valued Opendoor at an enterprise value of $4.8 billion.

On December 17, 2020, shareholders of Social Capital Hedosophia Holdings Corp II approved the merger. On December 21, 2020, the merger was finalized and the company began trading on the NASDAQ stock exchange under its new name, Opendoor.

In 2021, the company bought 37,000 homes.

In the beginning of 2022 the company began buying houses in the Bay Area.

On August 1, 2022, The Federal Trade Commission reported that Opendoor has agreed to pay a settlement of $62 million over charges of misleading marketing practices.

In the fourth quarter of 2022, Opendoor sold around 7,500 homes at an average loss of $28,000 each, compared to an average gain of $16,000 for each sale a year earlier.

In late 2022 co-founder Eric Wu remained CEO. After losses, he was replaced in the post by Carrie Wheeler in early 2023. Opendoor reported a loss of $1.4bn in 2022, after a loss of $662 million in 2021. Sales in 2022 were $15.6 billion. In November 2022 Opendoor cut 18% of its workforce, or 550 jobs.

Ahead of its 2020 IPO, the company's market cap was around $18 bn. That cap in early 2023 was slightly above $1 billion.

Opendoor cut 22% of its workforce in April of 2023, or roughly 560 positions mostly in the company's operations unit, citing a declining housing market. The company said new listings had dropped by around 30% since their 2022 peak due in part to rising mortgage interest rates.

Opendoor began collaborating with Zillow in Colorado in June 2023. At that time Opendoor was the largest "iBuyer" in the United States.

== Business model ==
Property owners bid to sell their properties on the online platform. When a bid is accepted, Opendoor purchases the property as-is, charging a fee comparable to the commissions real estate agents collect in return for the convenience of closing a sale quickly without home showings.

Opendoor then makes necessary repairs before relisting the property. By following this process, the company is known as an "iBuyer" in the real estate industry. Through this process, Opendoor carries an inventory of homes. In 2019, the company reported that the average time a property is held by the company is 90 days. The company has considered renting properties to make use of excess inventory.
