= Apartment List =

American online marketplace

- Type: Privately held company
- Industry: Technology / real estate
- Founded: 2011 in San Francisco, California
- Founders: John Kobs; Chris Erickson
- Headquarters: 475 Brannan Street; San Francisco, California
- Area served: United States
- Key people: John Kobs (Chairman); Matthew Woods (CEO)
- Number of employees: 250
- Website: www.apartmentlist.com

Apartment List is an American online marketplace for apartment listings. In January 2018, Apartment List had over 4 million units on its platform.

== History ==
The co-founders, John Kobs and Chris Erickson, launched Apartment List in September 2011 at TechCrunch Disrupt. They created the company after having negative experiences as both renters and landlords.

In November 2013, the company's first round of funding raised $23 million, with the lead investor being Matrix Partners. Another round of funding raised $50 million with Passport Capital in November 2017.

In late 2017, Apartment List partnered with Facebook Marketplace, Homes.com, and Realtor.com. In September 2021, Facebook Marketplace "discontinued the distribution of vehicle, home rentals and homes for sale listings from partner catalogue feeds."

In December 2020, the company announced it had raised $50 million in Series D funding. It then raised an extra $10 million from notable investors including Lizzo, Priyanka Chopra Jonas, Andre Iguodala, Alex Rodriguez and Daryl Morey. Iguodala listed Apartment List's Home Bridge program as one of the reasons for his support.

In September 2020, the company donated 3 apartments to Ronald McDonald House.

== Business model ==
Large, professionally-managed properties are charged a variable fee to use its service. Landlords and building managers are connected to potential renters and pay a fee when a renter has moved into their property.
