= Khosla Ventures =

American venture capital firm

- Type: Private
- Industry: Venture capital
- Founded: 2004; 22 years ago
- Founder: Vinod Khosla
- Headquarters: Menlo Park, California, U.S.
- Products: Investments
- Total assets: $15 billion (October 2021)
- Website: khoslaventures.com

Khosla Ventures is a private American venture capital firm based in Menlo Park, California. It was founded by entrepreneur Vinod Khosla in 2004 and as of 2021 had approximately US$15 billion in assets under management.

The firm works with early-stage companies in the Internet, computing, mobile technology, artificial intelligence, financial services, agriculture, healthcare and clean technology sectors. It is known for making early capital investments in startups such as Impossible Foods, Instacart, Affirm, DoorDash, Square and OpenAI.

== History ==
The firm was founded in 2004 by Vinod Khosla, a former general partner of Kleiner Perkins. Khosla Ventures's first two investment vehicles were funded with his own personal capital and were not open to institutional investors.

Khosla Ventures Fund III secured $1 billion to invest in traditional early stage and growth stage companies. Khosla also raised $300 million for Khosla Seed, which would invest in higher-risk opportunities and science experiments. By 2013, the company was considered one of the top investors in clean technology and had invested in more than 70 companies in the sector. As of October 2015, Khosla Ventures was one of the five largest and most active investors in the space sector.

In September 2017, Khosla Ventures had about $5 billion in assets under management.

In October 2021, Khosla Ventures announced that it had raised $1.4 billion in funding to invest in early-to-late stage startups, breaking down to $400 million for seed deals and $1 billion for later-stage companies.

In January 2022, Khosla Ventures raised $557 million in its first opportunity fund.

The firm ranked first in the "Founder's Choice VC" list of more than 200 venture capital firms in 2023.

The firm closed $3.1 billion in new capital across three funds as of November 2023 including $1 billion for later-stage companies, $500 million for seed-stage companies and $1.6 billion for its eighth flagship fund. It was the largest fundraiser by a venture capital firm that year. Khosla Ventures stated that the funding would be used for nuclear fusion, humanoid robots and artificial intelligence to support industries such as healthcare and transportation.

In February 2024, Keith Rabois returned to the firm as a managing director. In October 2024, the firm raised a special purpose vehicle of $405 million to invest in OpenAI.

== Notable investments ==
Khosla Ventures invests in companies in areas such as artificial intelligence, climate, sustainability, enterprise, consumer, financial technology, digital health, medical technology and diagnostics, therapeutics and frontier technology.

Khosla Ventures invested in DoorDash in 2013 before the company went public in 2020 with a $72 billion valuation. The firm also invested in Instacart in 2012 as part of the seed round before going public in 2020 with $11 billion in market capital. Other consumer investments include Opendoor.

The firm invested in Okta, Inc. in Series B funding in 2011 before going public in 2017 and GitLab in Series A funding in 2015 before going public in 2021 with in $15 billion market capital. Other enterprise investments include Cylance, Rubrik, Nutanix, and Replit.

Khosla Ventures invested in Block, Inc.'s Series A funding round in 2009 before the company went public in 2015. The firm also invested Affirm in its Series A round in 2013 before going public in 2021 with a $24 billion valuation. Other fintech investments include Stripe, Upstart, and Ramp.

Khosla Ventures invested in Commonwealth Fusion's $115 million Series A funding round in 2019. Khosla was also an early investor in QuantumScape which went public in 2020. Other sustainability investments include Fortera, LanzaTech and Verdagy.

The firm invested in Guardant Health's Series B funding round in 2014 before going public in 2018 and Alivecor in 2012. Other health investments include Headspace, Oscar, and Sword Health.

Khosla Ventures was the first venture capital firm to invest in OpenAI in 2018. The firm also invested in Rocket Lab's Series A funding round in 2013 before going public in 2021. Other frontier investments include Glydways, Hermeus, Opentrons, and Varda.

As of July 11th, 2026, the firm entered into a formal agreement to purchase ownership of the Seattle Seahawks from the Estate of Paul G. Allen, the previous ownership group.

== Programs and partnerships ==
In February 2021, Khosla Ventures filed plans for the public offerings of three special-purpose acquisition companies (SPAC), which intend to raise a total of $1.2 billion for the purpose of acquiring and taking public three private companies.

Through a Khosla-backed SPAC, Nextdoor, trading under the ticker KIND, had its initial public offering in November 2021 with a $4.3 billion valuation. By August 2023 KIND's market cap had fallen to about $810 million. Khosla Ventures Acquisition Co. announced that it would close business in December 2023.
