= List of awards and nominations received by Topher Grace =

Topher Grace awards and nominations
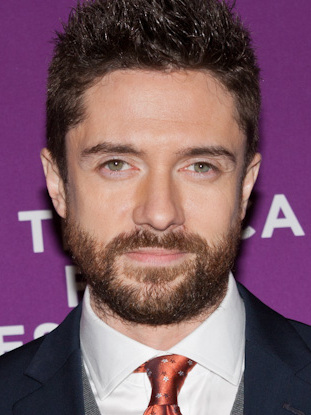
- Grace in 2012
Awards and nominations
Award	Wins	Nominations
Golden Globe Awards	0	1
SAG Awards	1	2
Teen Choice Awards	0	11
MTV Awards	0	1
NYFCC Awards	1	0
Young Artist Award	1	2
NBFF Awards	1	0
Daytime Emmy Awards	1	0

Totals (Note: Certain award groups do not simply award one winner. They acknowledge several different recipients, have runners-up, and have third place. Since this is a specific recognition and is different from losing an award, runner-up mentions are considered wins in this award tally. For simplification and to avoid errors, each award in this list has been presumed to have had a prior nomination.)
- Wins: 7
- Nominations: 23

Topher Grace is an American actor of the stage and screen.

He has received various accolades throughout his career, including a nomination for the Golden Globe Awards for his portrayal as David Duke in the biographical comedy-drama film BlacKkKlansman (2019).

For his television works, he has earned a Daytime Emmy Award for Outstanding Digital Daytime Drama Series for his role in The Beauty Inside (2012).

For his role as Eddie Brock / Venom in Spider-Man 3 (2007), he received a nomination for MTV Movie Award for Best Villain, a Teen Choice Award for Choice Movie: Rumble, and a Teen Choice Award for Choice Movie Villain.

== Full list of awards and nominations ==
=== Film ===
Year	Nominated work	Award	Result
2001	Traffic	Screen Actors Guild Award for Outstanding Performance by a Cast on a Motion Picture	Won
2001	Traffic	Young Artist Award for Breakthrough Performance – Male	Won
2004	In Good Company P.S.	National Board of Review Award for Breakthrough Performance by an Actor	Won
2004	In Good Company P.S.	New York Film Critics Circle Online Award for Breakthrough Performance	Won
2004	Win a Date with Tad Hamilton!	Teen Choice Award for Choice Movie Actor – Comedy	Nominated
2004	Win a Date with Tad Hamilton!	Teen Choice Award for Choice Movie – Hissy Fit	Nominated
2004	Win a Date with Tad Hamilton!	Teen Choice Award for Choice Movie – Lipock (shared with Kate Bosworth)	Nominated
2005	In Good Company P.S.	International Online Cinema Award for Best Breakthrough	Nominated
2005	—N/a	Premiere New Power Award for Actor	Won
2007	Spider-Man 3	Teen Choice Award for Choice Movie – Villain	Nominated
2007	Spider-Man 3	Teen Choice Award for Choice Movie – Rumble (shared with Tobey Maguire, James Franco & Thomas Haden Church)	Nominated
2008	Spider-Man 3	MTV Movie + TV Award for Best Villain	Nominated
2018	BlacKkKlansman	Cinema Vanguard Award	Won
2018	BlacKkKlansman	Artist of Distinction Award	Won
2019	BlacKkKlansman	Screen Actors Guild Award for Outstanding Performance by a Cast on a Motion Picture	Nominated

=== Television ===
Year	Title	Accolade	Results
1999	That '70s Show	Teen Choice Award for Choice TV – Breakout Performance	Nominated
1999	That '70s Show	Young Artist Award for Breakthrough Performance in a Television Series – Leading Young Actor	Nominated
1999	That '70s Show	Young Artist Award for Best Performance in a Television Series – Young Ensemble (shared with Laura Prepon, Mila Kunis, Wilmer Valderrama, Danny Masterson & Ashton Kutcher)	Nominated
2000	That '70s Show	Teen Choice Award for Choice TV Actor	Nominated
2001	That '70s Show	Teen Choice Award for Choice TV Actor	Nominated
2002	That '70s Show	Teen Choice Award for Choice TV Actor – Comedy	Nominated
2003	That '70s Show	Teen Choice Award for Choice TV Actor – Comedy	Nominated
2004	That '70s Show	Teen Choice Award for Choice TV Actor – Comedy	Nominated
2013	The Beauty Inside	Daytime Emmy Award for Outstanding New Approaches – Original Daytime Program or Series	Won
