= List of awards and nominations received by That '70s Show =

This is the list of major awards and nominations received by the television series That '70s Show (1998–2006).

== By award ==
=== ALMA Awards ===
- 1999: Outstanding Actor - Comedy Series (Wilmer Valderrama for playing "Fez", nominated)
- 2000: Outstanding Actor - Comedy Series (Wilmer Valderrama, nominated)
- 2001: Outstanding Actor - Comedy Series (Wilmer Valderrama, nominated)
- 2002: Outstanding Actor - Comedy Series (Wilmer Valderrama, nominated)
- 2006: Outstanding Script - Comedy or Drama Series ( for "Street Fighting Man", nominated)
- 2006: Outstanding Supporting Actor - TV Series (Wilmer Valderrama, nominated)

=== American Choreography Awards ===
- 2002: Outstanding Achievement in Television - Episodic or Sitcom (for "That '70s Musical", won)

=== American Society of Composers, Authors and Publishers ===
- 1999: Top Television Series (won)

=== Casting Society of America ===
- 1999: Best Casting - Episodic Comedy (nominated)
- 1999: Best Casting - Comedy Series Pilot (nominated)

=== Costume Designers Guild ===
- 1999: Outstanding Period/Fantasy Television Series (Melina Root, nominated)
- 2000: Outstanding Period/Fantasy Television Series (Melina Root, nominated)
- 2002: Outstanding Period/Fantasy Television Series (Melina Root, nominated)
- 2005: Outstanding Period/Fantasy Television Series (Melina Root, nominated)

=== GLAAD Media Awards ===
- 1998: Outstanding TV Individual Episode (for "Eric's Buddy", nominated)

=== Hollywood Makeup Artist and Hair Stylist Guild Awards ===
- 2000: Best Period Hair Styling - Television (For a Single Episode of a Regular Series - Sitcom, Drama or Daytime) (won)
- 2001: Best Period Hair Styling - Television (For a Single Episode of a Regular Series - Sitcom, Drama or Daytime) (won)
- 2004: Best Period Hair Styling - Television Series (nominated)

=== Kids' Choice Awards ===
- 2004: Favorite Television Actor - Ashton Kutcher (nominated)
- 2005: Favorite Television Actor - Ashton Kutcher (nominated)
- 2006: Favorite Television Actor - Ashton Kutcher (nominated)

=== People's Choice Awards ===
- 2005: Favorite Television Comedy (nominated)
- 2006: Favorite Television Comedy (nominated)

=== Primetime Emmy Awards ===
- 1999: Outstanding Costume Design for a Series - Melina Root (for "That Disco Episode", won)
- 1999: Outstanding Hairstyling For A Series (nominated)
- 2000: Outstanding Makeup for a Series (nominated)
- 2000: Outstanding Hairstyling For A Series (nominated)
- 2001: Outstanding Hairstyling For A Series (nominated)
- 2002: Outstanding Art Direction for a Multi-Camera Series (nominated)
- 2002: Outstanding Costumes for a Series (nominated)
- 2003: Outstanding Art Direction for a Multi-Camera Series (nominated)
- 2003: Outstanding Costumes for a Series (nominated)
- 2003: Outstanding Multi-Camera Sound Mixing for a Series or Special (nominated)
- 2004: Outstanding Costumes for a Series (nominated)
- 2004: Outstanding Multi-Camera Picture Editing for a Series (nominated)
- 2005: Outstanding Art Direction for a Multi-Camera Series (nominated)
- 2005: Outstanding Multi-Camera Picture Editing for a Series (nominated)
- 2005: Outstanding Multi-Camera Sound Mixing for a Series or Special (nominated)
- 2006: Outstanding Multi-Camera Picture Editing for a Series (nominated)

=== Teen Choice Awards ===
- 1999: TV - Breakout Performance (Topher Grace, nominated)
- 1999: TV - Breakout Performance (Laura Prepon, nominated)
- 1999: TV - Choice Comedy (nominated)
- 2000: TV - Choice Actor (Topher Grace, nominated)
- 2000: TV - Choice Actress (Mila Kunis, nominated)
- 2000: TV - Choice Comedy (nominated)
- 2000: TV - Choice Sidekick (Danny Masterson, nominated)
- 2001: TV - Choice Actor (Topher Grace, nominated)
- 2001: TV - Choice Actor (Ashton Kutcher, nominated)
- 2001: TV - Choice Actress (Mila Kunis, nominated)
- 2001: TV - Choice Comedy (nominated)
- 2002: TV - Choice Actor (Topher Grace, nominated)
- 2002: TV - Choice Actor (Ashton Kutcher, nominated)
- 2002: TV - Choice Actress (Mila Kunis, nominated)
- 2002: TV - Choice Actress (Laura Prepon, nominated)
- 2002: TV - Choice Comedy (nominated)
- 2002: TV - Choice Sidekick (Wilmer Valderrama, nominated)
- 2003: TV - Choice Actor (Topher Grace, nominated)
- 2003: TV - Choice Actor (Ashton Kutcher, won)
- 2003: TV - Choice Actress (Mila Kunis, nominated)
- 2003: TV - Choice Comedy (nominated)
- 2003: TV - Choice Sidekick (Wilmer Valderrama, won)
- 2004: TV - Choice Actor (Topher Grace, nominated)
- 2004: TV - Choice Actor (Ashton Kutcher, won)
- 2004: TV - Choice Actress (Mila Kunis, nominated)
- 2004: TV - Choice Comedy (nominated)
- 2004: TV - Choice Sidekick (Wilmer Valderrama, nominated)
- 2005: TV - Choice Actor (Ashton Kutcher, won)
- 2005: TV - Choice Actress (Mila Kunis, nominated)
- 2005: TV - Choice Comedy (nominated)
- 2005: TV - Choice Sidekick (Wilmer Valderrama, won)
- 2006: TV - Choice Actor (Wilmer Valderrama, won)
- 2006: TV - Choice Actress (Mila Kunis, nominated)
- 2018: TV - Choice Throwback Show (nominated)

=== TV Guide Award ===
- 1999: Favorite New Series (nominated)

=== Young Artist Award ===
- 1999: Best Performance in a TV Series - Young Ensemble (nominated)
- 1999: Best Performance in a TV Series - Supporting Young Actor (Ashton Kutcher, nominated)
- 1999: Best Performance in a TV Series - Supporting Young Actor (Wilmer Valderrama, nominated)
- 1999: Best Performance in a TV Series - Leading Young Actor (Topher Grace, nominated)
- 2000: Best Performance in a TV Comedy Series - Leading Young Actress (Mila Kunis, nominated)
- 2001: Best Performance in a TV Comedy Series - Leading Young Actress (Mila Kunis, nominated)
- 2004: Best Performance in a TV Series - Guest Starring Young Actress (Aria Wallace, nominated)

=== YoungStar Award ===
- 1999: Best Performance by a Young Actress in a Comedy TV Series (Mila Kunis, won)
- 2000: Best Young Actress/Performance in a Comedy TV Series (Mila Kunis, won)
