= National Board of Review Award for Breakthrough Performance =

Annual film award

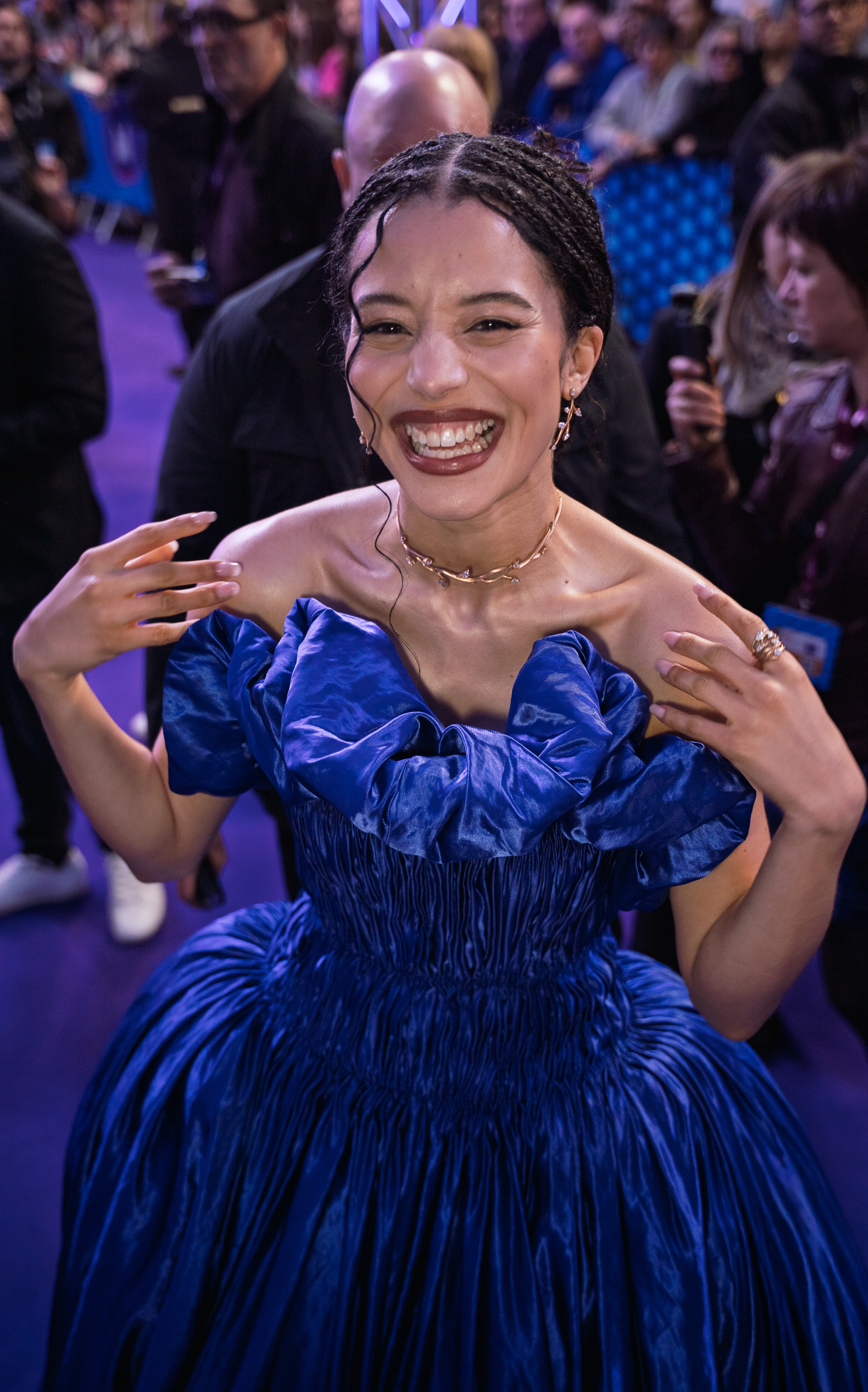
- The 2025 recipient: Chase Infiniti
- Awarded for: Best Performance by a Breakthrough Performer
- Country: United States
- Presented by: National Board of Review
- First award: Alicia Silverstone; Clueless (1995)
- Currently held by: Chase Infiniti for One Battle After Another (2025)
- Website: nationalboardofreview.org

The National Board of Review Award for Breakthrough Performance is one of the annual film awards given by the National Board of Review of Motion Pictures since 1995.

== Winners ==
=== 1990s ===
Year	Winner	Film	Role	Ref.
1995	Alicia Silverstone	Clueless	Cher Horowitz	
1996	Renée Zellweger	Jerry Maguire	Dorothy Boyd	
1997	Bai Ling	Red Corner	Shen Yuelin	
1998	Angelina Jolie	Playing by Heart	Joan	
1998	Billy Crudup	The Hi-Lo Country	Pete Calder	
1999	Hilary Swank	Boys Don't Cry	Brandon Teena	
1999	Wes Bentley	American Beauty	Ricky Fitts	

=== 2000s ===
Year	Winner	Film(s)	Role(s)	Ref.
2000	Michelle Rodriguez	Girlfight	Diana Guzman	
2000	Jamie Bell	Billy Elliot	Billy Elliot	
2001	Naomi Watts	Mulholland Drive	Betty Elms / Diane Selwyn	
2001	Hayden Christensen	Life as a House	Sam Monroe	
2002	Maggie Gyllenhaal	Secretary	Lee Holloway	
2002	Derek Luke	Antwone Fisher	Antwone Fisher	
2003	Charlize Theron	Monster	Aileen Wuornos	
2003	Paul Giamatti	American Splendor	Harvey Pekar	
2004	Emmy Rossum	The Phantom of the Opera	Christine Daaé	
2004	Topher Grace	In Good Company / P.S.	Carter Duryea / F. Scott Feinstadt	
2005	Q'orianka Kilcher	The New World	Pocahontas	
2005	Terrence Howard	Crash / Get Rich or Die Tryin' / Hustle & Flow	Cameron Thayer / Bama / Djay	
2006	Jennifer Hudson	Dreamgirls	Effie White	
2006	Rinko Kikuchi	Babel	Chieko Wataya	
2006	Ryan Gosling	Half Nelson	Dan Dunne	
2007	Elliot Page (Note: Credited as Ellen Page)	Juno	Juno MacGuff	
2007	Emile Hirsch	Into the Wild	Chris McCandless	
2008	Viola Davis	Doubt	Mrs. Miller	
2008	Dev Patel	Slumdog Millionaire	Jamal Malik	
2009	Gabourey Sidibe	Precious	Claireece "Precious" Jones	
2009	Jeremy Renner	The Hurt Locker	Sergeant First Class William James	

=== 2010s ===
Year	Winner	Film(s)	Role(s)	Ref.
2010	Jennifer Lawrence	Winter's Bone	Ree Dolly	
2011	Rooney Mara	The Girl with the Dragon Tattoo	Lisbeth Salander	
2011	Felicity Jones	Like Crazy	Anna Gardner	
2012	Quvenzhané Wallis	Beasts of the Southern Wild	Hushpuppy	
2012	Tom Holland	The Impossible	Lucas Bennett	
2013	Adèle Exarchopoulos	Blue Is the Warmest Colour	Adèle	
2013	Michael B. Jordan	Fruitvale Station	Oscar Grant	
2014	Jack O'Connell	Starred Up / Unbroken	Eric Love / Louis "Louie" Zamperini	
2015	Abraham Attah	Beasts of No Nation	Agu	
2015	Jacob Tremblay	Room	Jack Newsome	
2016	Royalty Hightower	The Fits	Toni	
2016	Lucas Hedges	Manchester by the Sea	Patrick Chandler	
2017	Timothée Chalamet	Call Me by Your Name	Elio Perlman	
2018	Thomasin McKenzie	Leave No Trace	Tom	
2019	Paul Walter Hauser	Richard Jewell	Richard Jewell	

=== 2020s ===
Year	Winner	Film	Role	Ref.
2020	Sidney Flanigan	Never Rarely Sometimes Always	Autumn Callahan	
2021	Alana Haim	Licorice Pizza	Alana Kane	
2021	Cooper Hoffman	Licorice Pizza	Gary Valentine	
2022	Danielle Deadwyler	Till	Mamie Till-Mobley	
2022	Gabriel LaBelle	The Fabelmans	Sammy Fabelman	
2023	Teyana Taylor	A Thousand and One	Inez de la Paz	
2024	Mikey Madison	Anora	Anora "Ani" Mikheeva	
2025	Chase Infiniti	One Battle After Another	Willa Ferguson / Charlene Calhoun	
