= Hospitality (band) =

American indie pop band

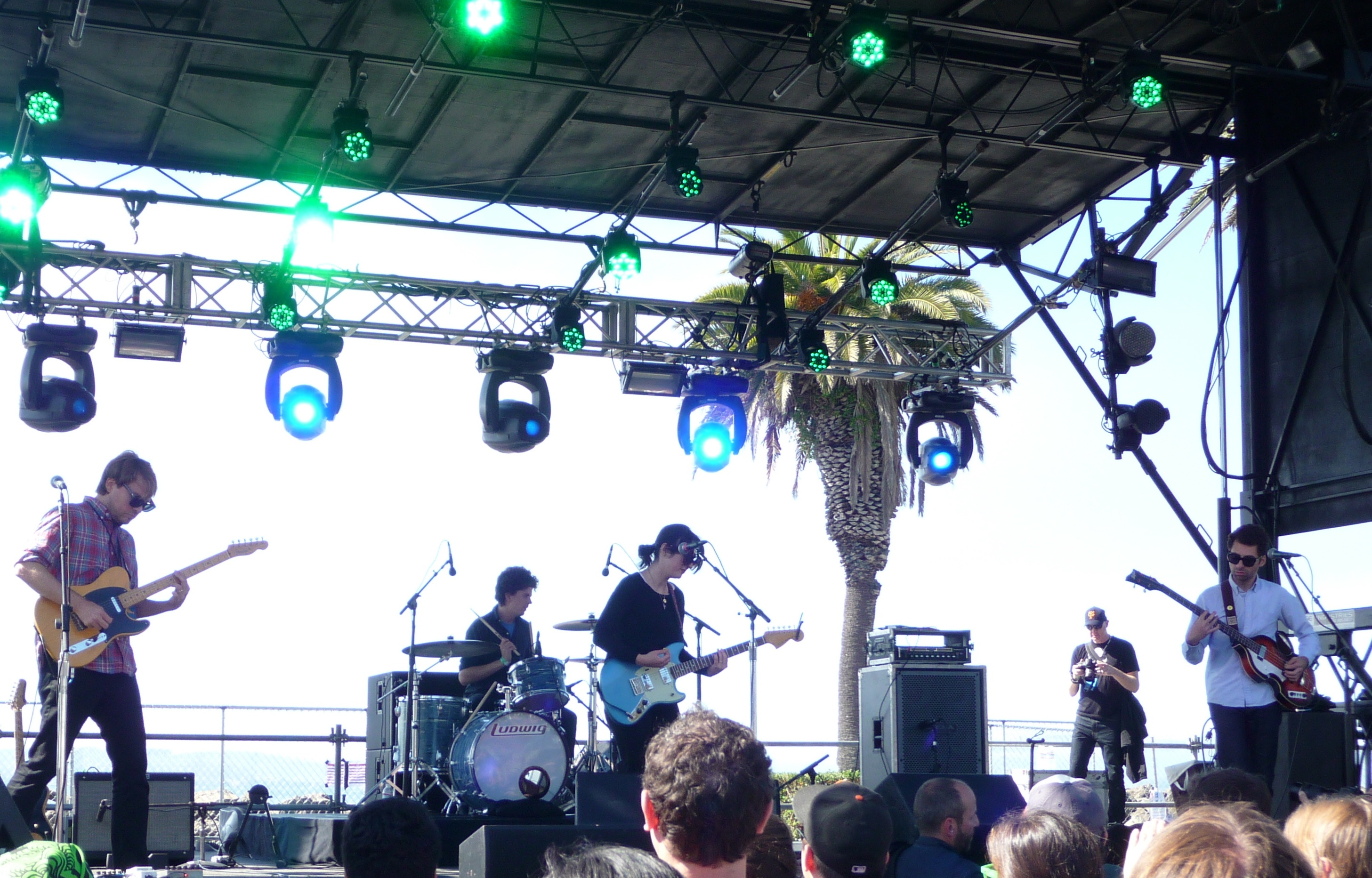

Background information
- Origin: Brooklyn, New York
- Genres: Indie pop, Rock
- Years active: 2007–2014
- Labels: Merge Records; Fire Records (UK)
- Members: Amber Papini; Nathan Michel; Brian Betancourt; David Christian
- Past members: Gia Papini; Kyle Olson

Hospitality was an American Indie pop trio from Brooklyn, New York, formed in 2007 and consisting of Amber Papini (vocals, guitar), Brian Betancourt (bass) and Nathan Michel (percussion). The band was signed to Merge Records and released their first full-length album on January 31, 2012.

== History ==
Papini and Michel met at a party at the Yale School of Music. They later married and moved to Red Hook, Brooklyn.

Hospitality released its first, self-titled EP in 2008. It came about after the band met Karl Blau at a show they both played at the Cake Shop. Blau heard Hospitality's soundcheck and asked if he could record them in exchange for Hospitality acting as his backing band sometime in the future. The EP garnered a few favorable reviews and earned Hospitality the title of band to watch from Stereogum.com.

Hospitality remained quiet for the next few years as Betancourt toured with White Rabbits and Papini tended to a death in the family. They eventually recorded their first full-length album and signed to Merge Records in September 2011. The band went on hiatus in 2016 when Papini and Michel started a family and relocated to Charleston.

== Critical reception ==
The band garnered buzz from Wired, NPR and others even before releasing their debut. The album was met with generally positive reviews. Pitchfork.com gave it a 7.4, The A.V. Club rated it an "A−" and Rolling Stone awarded 4 out of 5 stars. Whitney Matheson of USA Today's 'Pop Candy' named it her album of the week after its debut.

The album was listed at #32 on Rolling Stone's list of the top 50 albums of 2012, saying "Indie-pop cuteness this severely catchy doesn’t come around too often."

The first video from the album, for the song "Friends of Friends," debuted on Stereogum.com on January 23, 2012. It featured Alia Shawkat of Arrested Development, comedian Kurt Braunohler and Gabe Delahaye of Videogum.com.

== Discography ==
=== Albums ===
- Hospitality (2012)
- Trouble (2014)

=== EPs ===
- Hospitality (2008)
- The Drift b/w Monkey (2012)

=== Singles ===
- "Friends of Friends" (2011)
- "Betty Wang" (2011)
- "The Drift" (2012)
- "Monkey" (2012)
