= Nathan Michel =

American musician

Nathan Michel is an American experimental electronic musician. He primarily composes and performs his music on a laptop. He has released albums on labels such as Tigerbeat6, SKI-PP and Sonig and has collaborated with well-known laptop group DAT politics. Michel has received numerous awards for his work including a Morton Gould Young Composer Award from ASCAP and a Charles Ives Scholarship from the American Academy of Arts and Letters. He received his PhD in music composition from Princeton University in 2007.

Michel and his wife, Amber Papini, constitute two-thirds of the pop band Hospitality.

== Releases ==
- ABC DEF 2002
- Dear Bicycle 2003
- Trebly 2003
- Alphabet Series C 2004
- The Beast 2005
