= List of Jane the Virgin episodes =

List of episodes of American Comedy/Drama series 'Jane the Virgin'

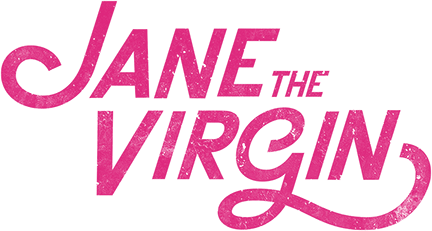

Jane the Virgin is an American comedy-drama television series that premiered on The CW on October 13, 2014. The series follows Jane Villanueva, a hard-working, religious young Latina woman whose vow to save her virginity until marriage is shattered when a doctor mistakenly artificially inseminates her during a checkup. To make matters worse, the biological donor is a married man, a former playboy and cancer survivor who is not only the new owner of the hotel where Jane works, but was also her former teenage crush.

The show was ordered to series on May 8, 2014, followed by a full season order on October 21, 2014. On January 11, 2015, the show was renewed for a second season. On March 11, 2016, the show was renewed for a third season. On January 8, 2017, the show was renewed for a fourth season. On April 2, 2018, the show was renewed for a fifth and final season.

During the course of the series, 100 episodes of Jane the Virgin aired over five seasons, between October 13, 2014, and July 31, 2019.

== Series overview ==
Season	Episodes	Originally released	
Season	Episodes	First released	Last released
1	22	October 13, 2014	May 11, 2015
2	22	October 12, 2015	May 16, 2016
3	20	October 17, 2016	May 22, 2017
4	17	October 13, 2017	April 20, 2018
5	19	March 27, 2019	July 31, 2019

== Episodes ==
=== Season 1 (2014–2015) ===
No. overall	No. in season	Title	Directed by	Written by	Original release date	U.S. viewers (millions)
1	1	"Chapter One" "Pilot"	Brad Silberling	Teleplay by : Jennie Snyder Urman	October 13, 2014	1.61
2	2	"Chapter Two"	Uta Briesewitz	Jennie Snyder Urman	October 20, 2014	1.36
3	3	"Chapter Three"	Brad Silberling	Meredith Averill	October 27, 2014	1.09
4	4	"Chapter Four"	Debbie Allen	Corinne Brinkerhoff	November 3, 2014	1.01
5	5	"Chapter Five"	Edward Ornelas	Josh Reims	November 10, 2014	1.22
6	6	"Chapter Six"	Jann Turner	Paul Sciarrotta	November 17, 2014	1.09
7	7	"Chapter Seven"	Janice Cooke	David S. Rosenthal	November 24, 2014	0.96
8	8	"Chapter Eight"	Norman Buckley	Josh Reims & Carolina Rivera	December 8, 2014	1.22
9	9	"Chapter Nine"	Zetna Fuentes	Corinne Brinkerhoff	December 15, 2014	1.28
10	10	"Chapter Ten"	Elodie Keene	Meredith Averill & Christopher Oscar Peña	January 19, 2015	1.39
11	11	"Chapter Eleven"	Joanna Kerns	Gracie Glassmeyer	January 26, 2015	1.55
12	12	"Chapter Twelve"	Gina Lamar	David S. Rosenthal	February 2, 2015	1.24
13	13	"Chapter Thirteen"	Howard Deutch	Josh Reims	February 9, 2015	1.34
14	14	"Chapter Fourteen"	Brad Silberling	Paul Sciarrotta	February 16, 2015	1.31
15	15	"Chapter Fifteen"	Melanie Mayron	Emmylou Diaz & David S. Rosenthal	March 9, 2015	1.26
16	16	"Chapter Sixteen"	Joanna Kerns	Josh Reims & Carolina Rivera	March 16, 2015	1.10
17	17	"Chapter Seventeen"	Uta Briesewitz	Amy Rardin & Jessica O'Toole	April 6, 2015	0.93
18	18	"Chapter Eighteen"	Edward Ornelas	Meredith Averill	April 13, 2015	1.03
19	19	"Chapter Nineteen"	Robert Luketic	Emmylou Diaz & David S. Rosenthal	April 20, 2015	1.05
20	20	"Chapter Twenty"	Debbie Allen	Corinne Brinkerhoff & Paul Sciarrotta	April 27, 2015	1.06
21	21	"Chapter Twenty-One"	Stuart Gillard	Jessica O'Toole & Amy Rardin	May 4, 2015	1.05
22	22	"Chapter Twenty-Two"	Zetna Fuentes	Josh Reims & Jennie Snyder Urman	May 11, 2015	1.24

=== Season 2 (2015–2016) ===
No. overall	No. in season	Title	Directed by	Written by	Original release date	U.S. viewers (millions)
23	1	"Chapter Twenty-Three"	Brad Silberling	Jennie Snyder Urman	October 12, 2015	1.06
24	2	"Chapter Twenty-Four"	Edward Ornelas	David S. Rosenthal	October 19, 2015	0.84
25	3	"Chapter Twenty-Five"	Robert Luketic	Corinne Brinkerhoff	October 26, 2015	0.94
26	4	"Chapter Twenty-Six"	Zetna Fuentes	Paul Sciarrotta	November 2, 2015	1.09
27	5	"Chapter Twenty-Seven"	Jann Turner	Jessica O'Toole & Amy Rardin	November 9, 2015	1.11
28	6	"Chapter Twenty-Eight"	Melanie Mayron	Corinne Brinkerhoff & Micah Schraft	November 16, 2015	1.10
29	7	"Chapter Twenty-Nine"	Edward Ornelas	David S. Rosenthal & Dara Resnick Creasey	November 23, 2015	0.98
30	8	"Chapter Thirty"	Uta Briesewitz	Paul Sciarrotta & Carolina Rivera	December 14, 2015	0.98
31	9	"Chapter Thirty-One"	Joanna Kerns	Emmylou Diaz & Jessica O'Toole & Amy Rardin	January 25, 2016	0.99
32	10	"Chapter Thirty-Two"	Jason Reilly	Micah Schraft	February 1, 2016	1.04
33	11	"Chapter Thirty-Three"	Uta Briesewitz	Michael J. Cinquemani	February 8, 2016	0.94
34	12	"Chapter Thirty-Four"	Howard Deutch	Madeline Hendricks	February 22, 2016	0.94
35	13	"Chapter Thirty-Five"	Melanie Mayron	Chantelle M. Wells	February 29, 2016	0.91
36	14	"Chapter Thirty-Six"	Uta Briesewitz	Jessica O'Toole & Amy Rardin	March 7, 2016	0.92
37	15	"Chapter Thirty-Seven"	Melanie Mayron	Sarah Goldfinger	March 21, 2016	0.77
38	16	"Chapter Thirty-Eight"	Georgina Garcia Riedel	Micah Schraft	March 28, 2016	0.94
39	17	"Chapter Thirty-Nine"	Matthew Diamond	Carolina Rivera	April 11, 2016	0.93
40	18	"Chapter Forty"	Anna Mastro	Jessica O'Toole & Amy Rardin	April 18, 2016	0.96
41	19	"Chapter Forty-One"	Gina Lamar	Joe Lawson	April 25, 2016	0.84
42	20	"Chapter Forty-Two"	Zetna Fuentes	Micah Schraft & Paul Sciarrotta	May 2, 2016	0.86
43	21	"Chapter Forty-Three"	Melanie Mayron	Jessica O'Toole & Amy Rardin & Paul Sciarrotta	May 9, 2016	0.90
44	22	"Chapter Forty-Four"	Jann Turner	Paul Sciarrotta & Jennie Snyder Urman	May 16, 2016	0.97

=== Season 3 (2016–2017) ===
No. overall	No. in season	Title	Directed by	Written by	Original release date	U.S. viewers (millions)
45	1	"Chapter Forty-Five"	Gina Lamar	Jennie Snyder Urman	October 17, 2016	1.09
46	2	"Chapter Forty-Six"	Brad Silberling	David S. Rosenthal & Paul Sciarrotta	October 24, 2016	1.10
47	3	"Chapter Forty-Seven"	Eva Longoria Baston	Carolina Rivera & Micah Schraft	October 31, 2016	0.97
48	4	"Chapter Forty-Eight"	Melanie Mayron	Sarah Goldfinger & Jessica O'Toole & Amy Rardin	November 7, 2016	1.08
49	5	"Chapter Forty-Nine"	Anna Mastro	Paul Sciarrotta	November 14, 2016	0.93
50	6	"Chapter Fifty"	Melanie Mayron	Valentina Garza & David S. Rosenthal	November 21, 2016	1.01
51	7	"Chapter Fifty-One"	Gina Lamar	Sarah Goldfinger & Jessica O'Toole & Amy Rardin	November 28, 2016	1.15
52	8	"Chapter Fifty-Two"	Anna Mastro	Carolina Rivera & Micah Schraft	January 23, 2017	0.99
53	9	"Chapter Fifty-Three"	Gina Lamar	Chantelle M. Wells	January 30, 2017	0.91
54	10	"Chapter Fifty-Four"	Melanie Mayron	Micah Schraft & Jennie Snyder Urman	February 6, 2017	0.93
55	11	"Chapter Fifty-Five"	Brad Silberling	Paul Sciarrotta & Jennie Snyder Urman	February 13, 2017	1.07
56	12	"Chapter Fifty-Six"	Matthew Diamond	Valentina Garza	February 20, 2017	1.06
57	13	"Chapter Fifty-Seven"	Zetna Fuentes	Madeline Hendricks	February 27, 2017	0.88
58	14	"Chapter Fifty-Eight"	Melanie Mayron	Merigan Mulhern	March 20, 2017	0.84
59	15	"Chapter Fifty-Nine"	Anna Mastro	Deidre Shaw	March 27, 2017	0.89
60	16	"Chapter Sixty"	Micah Schraft	Carolina Rivera & Micah Schraft	April 24, 2017	0.79
61	17	"Chapter Sixty-One"	Melanie Mayron	Paul Sciarrotta	May 1, 2017	0.77
62	18	"Chapter Sixty-Two"	Fernando Sariñana	Jessica O'Toole & Amy Rardin & David S. Rosenthal	May 8, 2017	0.99
63	19	"Chapter Sixty-Three"	Gina Lamar	Paul Sciarrotta	May 15, 2017	0.76
64	20	"Chapter Sixty-Four"	Melanie Mayron	Micah Schraft & Jennie Snyder Urman	May 22, 2017	0.96

=== Season 4 (2017–2018) ===
No. overall	No. in season	Title	Directed by	Written by	Original release date	U.S. viewers (millions)
65	1	"Chapter Sixty-Five"	Brad Silberling	Jennie Snyder Urman & Paul Sciarrotta	October 13, 2017	0.68
66	2	"Chapter Sixty-Six"	Gina Lamar	Valentina Garza & Jessica O'Toole & Amy Rardin	October 20, 2017	0.61
67	3	"Chapter Sixty-Seven"	Fernando Sariñana	Carolina Rivera & Micah Schraft	October 27, 2017	0.60
68	4	"Chapter Sixty-Eight"	Gina Lamar	Deirdre Shaw & Chantelle M. Wells	November 3, 2017	0.69
69	5	"Chapter Sixty-Nine"	Stuart Gillard	Paul Sciarrotta	November 10, 2017	0.65
70	6	"Chapter Seventy"	Melanie Mayron	Carolina Rivera & Micah Schraft	November 17, 2017	0.61
71	7	"Chapter Seventy-One"	Micah Schraft	Valentina Garza & Deidre Shaw	December 8, 2017	0.65
72	8	"Chapter Seventy-Two"	Melanie Mayron	Carolina Rivera & Paul Sciarrotta	January 26, 2018	0.68
73	9	"Chapter Seventy-Three"	Eric Lea	Valentina Garza & Chantelle M. Wells	February 2, 2018	0.67
74	10	"Chapter Seventy-Four"	Gina Rodriguez	Micah Schraft & Paul Sciarrotta	February 9, 2018	0.80
75	11	"Chapter Seventy-Five"	Gina Lamar	Merigan Mulhern	March 2, 2018	0.59
76	12	"Chapter Seventy-Six"	Melanie Mayron	Leah Longoria	March 9, 2018	0.58
77	13	"Chapter Seventy-Seven"	Gina Lamar	Deirdre Shaw & Chantelle M. Wells	March 16, 2018	0.59
78	14	"Chapter Seventy-Eight"	Justin Baldoni	Valentina Garza & Micah Schraft	March 23, 2018	0.65
79	15	"Chapter Seventy-Nine"	Gina Lamar	Paul Sciarrotta	April 6, 2018	0.54
80	16	"Chapter Eighty"	Micah Schraft	Micah Schraft	April 13, 2018	0.57
81	17	"Chapter Eighty-One"	Gina Lamar	Jennie Snyder Urman & Paul Sciarrotta	April 20, 2018	0.58

=== Season 5 (2019) ===
No. overall	No. in season	Title	Directed by	Written by	Original release date	U.S. viewers (millions)
82	1	"Chapter Eighty-Two"	Gina Rodriguez	Jennie Snyder Urman	March 27, 2019	0.79
83	2	"Chapter Eighty-Three"	Gina Lamar	Chantelle M. Wells & Katie Wech	April 3, 2019	0.61
84	3	"Chapter Eighty-Four"	Brad Silberling	Valentina L. Garza & Deidre Shaw	April 10, 2019	0.61
85	4	"Chapter Eighty-Five"	Melanie Mayron	Carolina Rivera & Liz Sczudlo	April 17, 2019	0.69
86	5	"Chapter Eighty-Six"	Gina Lamar	Joni Lefkowitz & Madeline Hendricks	April 24, 2019	0.58
87	6	"Chapter Eighty-Seven"	Eric Lea	Rafael Agustín	May 1, 2019	0.59
88	7	"Chapter Eighty-Eight"	Stuart Gillard	Deirdre Shaw	May 8, 2019	0.71
89	8	"Chapter Eighty-Nine"	Zetna Fuentes	Katie Wech & Valentina L. Garza	May 15, 2019	0.62
90	9	"Chapter Ninety"	Gina Rodriguez	Chantelle M. Wells	May 22, 2019	0.48
91	10	"Chapter Ninety-One"	Gina Lamar	Joni Lefkowitz	May 29, 2019	0.56
92	11	"Chapter Ninety-Two"	Leo Zisman	Liz Sczudlo	June 5, 2019	0.57
93	12	"Chapter Ninety-Three"	Melanie Mayron	Carolina Rivera & Madeline Hendricks	June 12, 2019	0.63
94	13	"Chapter Ninety-Four"	Fernando Sariñana	Valentina L. Garza & Deidre Shaw	June 19, 2019	0.63
95	14	"Chapter Ninety-Five"	Neema Barnette	Liz Sczudlo & Madeline Hendricks	June 26, 2019	0.68
96	15	"Chapter Ninety-Six"	Viet Nguyen	Ben O'Hara	July 10, 2019	0.67
97	16	"Chapter Ninety-Seven"	Melanie Mayron	Deidre Shaw & Chantelle M. Wells	July 17, 2019	0.60
98	17	"Chapter Ninety-Eight"	Gina Lamar	Carolina Rivera	July 24, 2019	0.53
99	18	"Chapter Ninety-Nine" (Note: This episode serves as a behind-the-scenes feature rather than a contributing episode to the series' fictional storyline.)	N/A	N/A	July 31, 2019	0.64
100	19	"Chapter One Hundred"	Brad Silberling	Jennie Snyder Urman	July 31, 2019	0.65

== Ratings ==
Jane the Virgin : U.S. viewers per episode (millions)
Audience measurement performed by Nielsen Media Research
