= Jill Bialosky =

American writer (born 1957)

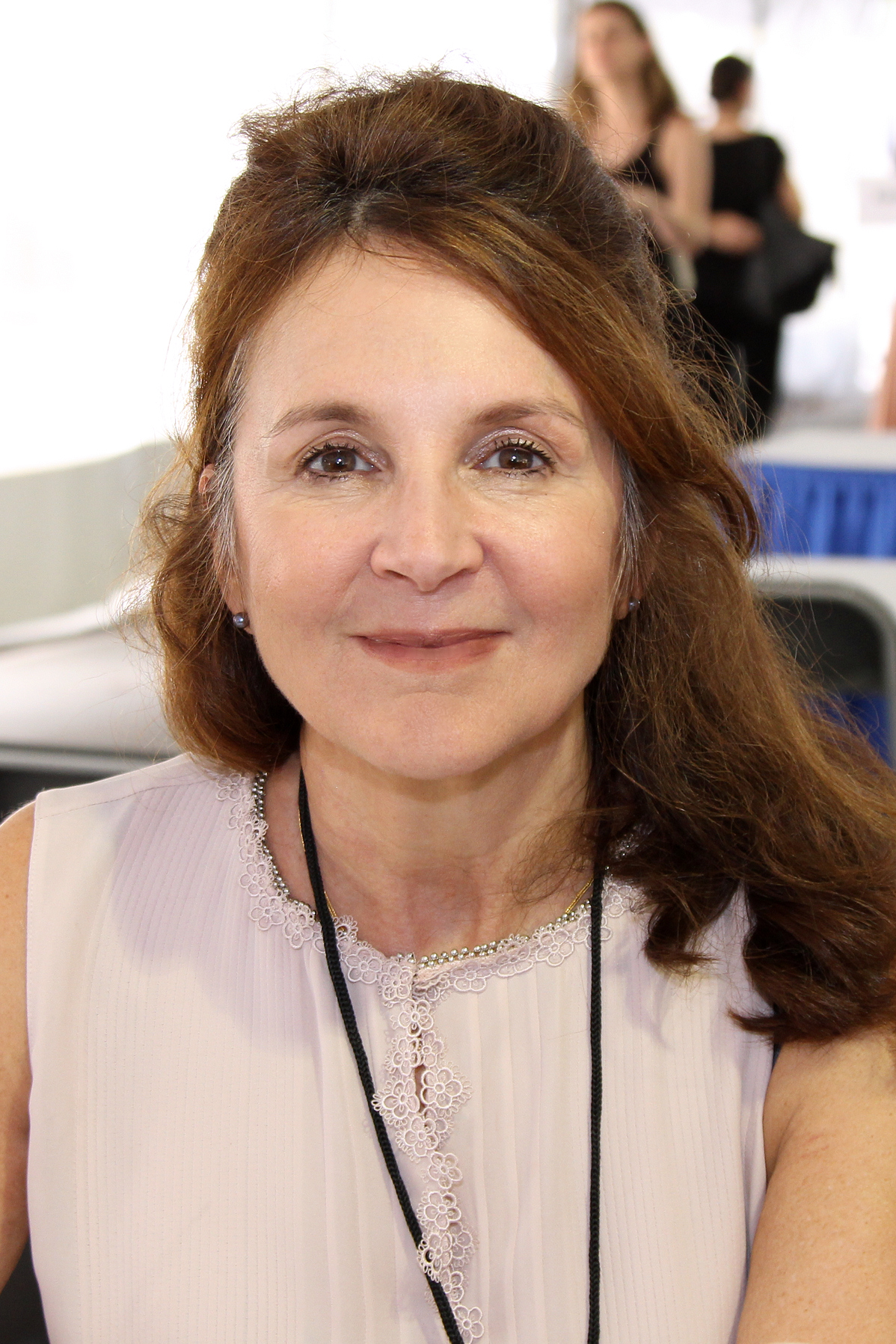
- Bialosky at the 2017 Texas Book Festival
- Born: Jill Robin Bialosky; April 13, 1957 (age 69); Cleveland, Ohio, U.S.
- Education: Ohio University (BA); Johns Hopkins University (MA); Iowa Writers' Workshop (MFA)
- Occupations: Poet; novelist; essayist; editor
- Children: 3 (2 deceased)
- Parent(s): Milton Bialosky; Iris Bialosky
- Website: www.jillbialosky.com

Jill Bialosky (born Jill Robin Bialosky, April 13, 1957, in Cleveland, Ohio) is an American poet, novelist, essayist and executive book editor. She is the author of four volumes of poetry, three novels, and two recent memoirs. She co-edited with Helen Schulman an anthology, Wanting a Child. Her poems and essays have appeared in The New Yorker, The New York Times Magazine, The Paris Review, The Atlantic Monthly, Harper’s, O Magazine, Real Simple, American Scholar, The Kenyon Review, Harvard Review, and chosen for Best American Poetry, among others.

== Early life ==
Bialosky grew up in suburban Cleveland, Ohio. Her mother is Iris Bialosky and her father was Milton Bialosky, who died when Bialosky's mother was 24, with three daughters under the age of three. In History of a Suicide Bialosky writes about growing up with four sisters and a widowed mother and her youngest sister, Kim's suicide on April 15, 1990, at age 21.

== Writing ==
Cara Benson in an interview in Bookslut called her "a versatile and accomplished woman of letters. She’s published acclaimed works of poetry, memoir, and fiction, and is an editor and senior executive .... In whichever genre she is writing, to me her work stands out for its compassionate attention to the psyche of the imperfect humans struggling through their lives".

Her free verse poems explore themes of desire, domesticity, and myth. And in an interview with the Los Angeles Review of Books she defines her poetics as having to do with ordinary experiences and everyday living. In Bialosky's poem "History Lesson," she writes of gathering at Rosh Hashanah with her family.

== Reception ==
Subterranean (2001), was a finalist for the James Laughlin Award from the Academy of American Poets.

Intruder (2008) was a finalist for the Paterson Prize.

History of a Suicide: My Sister’s Unfinished Life (2011) was a New York Times Bestseller. It received universal praise including a four star People review and was deemed one of the top ten books of the year by Entertainment Weekly. It was a finalist for the Ohioana Award and Books for a Better Life.

The Players (2015), "Bialosky’s fifth collection of poems takes cues from the laconic dicta of baseball."

The Prize (2015), received broad praise. It was selected as an Editor's Choice by The New York Times Book Review.

== Personal life ==
Bialosky received a Bachelor of Arts degree from Ohio University, a Master of Arts degree from Johns Hopkins University and an MFA degree from the University of Iowa’s Writer’s workshop. In Poetry Will Save Your life she recounts the "tragedy of losing a first daughter at 10 hours old when she was 32 and then a second baby, this time a son, lost within the first 24 hours of birth, before the healthy birth, finally, of her third child, also a son."

Jill Bialosky is a vice president and executive editor at W. W. Norton and lives in New York City.

== Controversy ==
On October 4, 2017, the online literary magazine Tourniquet Review published William Logan's review of Poetry Will Save Your Life, in which he accused Bialosky of plagiarism, citing passages in the book that bore similarities to uncredited sources, including Wikipedia articles. Subsequently, The New York Times covered the allegation. TheWalrus.ca later published an article written by William Logan about Jill Bialosky's first memoir, History of a Suicide: My Sister's Unfinished Life, accusing Bialosky of further plagiarism. Jill Bialosky's publisher (Simon & Schuster) and her employer (W.W. Norton) both spoke out in Bialosky's defence. Seventy-two authors signed a Letter to the Editor in The New York Times stating: "We, as writers and friends of literature, wish to register our concern in regard to 'Author Fights Plagiarism Charges by Critic' […] It would be a terrible disservice to Ms. Bialosky and to your readers if the article kept people from appreciating her substantial contributions to American letters." Nowhere in the letter, however, did the signatories dispute the accuracy of Logan's accusations.

== Books ==
=== Poetry ===
- The End of Desire (1999, A. A. Knopf)
- Subterranean (2001, A. A. Knopf)
- Intruder (2008, A. A. Knopf)
- The Players (2015, A. A. Knopf)
- Asylum: A Personal, Historical, Natural Inquiry in 103 Lyric Sections (2020, Knopf)
- Mock Heart, 2026

=== Memoir ===
- History of a Suicide: My Sister's Unfinished Life (2011, Atria Books)
- Poetry Will Save Your Life--A Memoir (May 2017, Atria Books)
- The End Is the Beginning, (2025, Washington Square Press)

=== Fiction ===
- House Under Snow: A Novel (2002, Houghton Mifflin Harcourt)
- The Life Room: A Novel (2007, Houghton Mifflin Harcourt)
- The Prize (2015, Counterpoint)
- The Deceptions (2022, Counterpoint)
