= Helen Schulman =

American novelist (born 1961)

- Born: April 1961 (age 65) New York City, U.S.
- Occupation: Novelist; short story writer; screenwriter
- Education: Cornell University (BA); Columbia University (MFA)
- Relatives: Sarah Schulman (sister)

Helen Schulman (born April 1961) is an American writer. Her fifth novel, This Beautiful Life, was an international bestseller and was named one of the 100 Notable Books of 2011 by The New York Times Book Review.

== Background and career ==
Helen Schulman was born in New York City, where she lives, writes, teaches. She received a BA at Cornell University and an MFA in creative writing from Columbia University. She has published seven novels. Her most recent novel, Lucky Dogs, was released on June 6, 2023. In a starred review of the book, Kirkus Reviews wrote "In a word: wow . . . Schulman has engineered a series of breathtaking aha moments, set to go off like timed explosives . . . Her finest work to date."

Her novel Come With Me was released on November 27, 2018. It's a book "about how technology breaks apart and then re-configures a family." The New York Times writes, "Schulman has wrapped her distress in such an attractive package that the book slides down almost without your noticing its seriousness of purpose." The NYTimes Book Review says it is "strikingly original, compelling and beautifully written." Kirkus Reviews called the book "Richly imagined, profound, and of the moment" and the San Francisco Chronicle calls it "mind-blowingly brilliant." Speaking with Evangeline Riddiford in an interview about her book, Schulman says, "My father, an atheist, always said both heaven and hell were right here on earth. I’ll do him one step further: sometimes both exist in your living room."

This Beautiful Life was published in 2011, about which The New York Times wrote, “Riveting.... As much as this book fiercely inhabits our shared online reality, it operates most powerfully on a deeper level, posing an enduring question about American values.” The novel was a New York Times Book Review Editor's Choice, and was on numerous bestseller lists, including The New York Times, the Los Angeles Times, the San Francisco Chronicle, and The Boston Globe.

A Day at the Beach, published in 2008, focuses on a family living through the September 11 attacks and the aftermath. The New Yorker wrote, “Schulman, in her fourth novel, gets both her cultural moment and the psychological particulars of a disintegrating marriage exactly right, and her writing is distractingly, almost brazenly beautiful. The result slyly demonstrates both the inadequacy of art and its insolent resilience in disaster's aftermath.”

Schulman's fiction, non-fiction, and reviews have appeared in Vanity Fair, Time, Vogue, GQ, The New York Times Book Review, and The Paris Review. She co-edited with Jill Bialosky the anthology Wanting a Child. She has written numerous screenplays, including co-writing an adaptation of her novel P.S., which was made into a film in 2004 starring Laura Linney. Schulman's essay "The Habitual Aborter" was published in Time and in the anthology Wanting a Child. Her essay, "My Father, The Garbage Head" was published in the anthology, An Uncertain Inheritance and her essay on William Faulkner's As I Lay Dying was published in lithub.

Schulman has taught in graduate programs at Columbia University and New York University. She teaches at The New School where she is the Fiction Chair at the Writing Program and a tenured Professor of Writing. She is a former Guggenheim Fellow (2019–20), she has also been a Sundance Fellow, an Aspen Words Fellow (The Aspen Institute), a NYFA Fellow, A Tennessee Williams Fellow at Columbia University and has won a Pushcart Prize.

== Selected works ==
- Lucky Dogs: A Novel. Knopf. 6 June 2023. ISBN 978-0593536230.
- Come with Me: A Novel. HarperCollins. 27 November 2018. ISBN 978-0062459138.
- This Beautiful Life: A Novel. HarperCollins. 2 August 2011. ISBN 978-0-06-209268-7.
- A Day at the Beach: A Novel. Houghton Mifflin Harcourt. 29 April 2008. ISBN 978-0-547-52448-1.
- "My Father the Garbage Head", in Nell Casey, editor, An Uncertain Inheritance: Writers on Caring for Family, William Morrow, 2007, ISBN 0060875305
- P.S.: A Novel. Bloomsbury USA. 3 May 2002. ISBN 978-1-58234-208-5.
- The Revisionist, Bloomsbury USA, 2001, ISBN 9781582341729
- Wanting a Child, Farrar Straus & Giroux, 1999, ISBN 0374525943
- Out of Time, Atheneum Press, 1991, ISBN 9780689121227
- Not a Free Show (collection of short stories), Knopf, 1988, ISBN 9780394561660
