= Jane the Virgin =

American satirical telenovela (2014–2019)

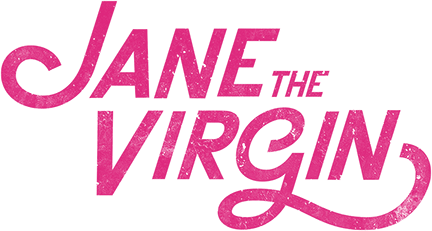
- Genre: Comedy-drama; Romantic comedy; Telenovela; Satire
- Based on: Juana la virgen by Perla Farías
- Developed by: Jennie Snyder Urman
- Showrunner: Jennie Snyder Urman
- Starring: Gina Rodriguez; Andrea Navedo; Yael Grobglas; Justin Baldoni; Ivonne Coll; Brett Dier; Jaime Camil; Elias Janssen
- Narrated by: Anthony Mendez
- Theme music composer: Gustavo Santaolalla
- Composer: Kevin Kiner
- Country of origin: United States
- Original languages: English; Spanish
- No. of seasons: 5
- No. of episodes: 100 (list of episodes)

Production
- Executive producers: Jennie Snyder Urman; Ben Silverman; Gary Pearl; Jorge Granier; Max Richards; Cyrus Farrokh; Brad Silberling; David S. Rosenthal; Paul Sciarrotta
- Producers: Micah Schraft; Gina Lamar; Tim Silver; Deirdre Shaw; Liz Sczudlo
- Production locations: Los Angeles, California; Huntington Beach, California
- Cinematography: Lowell Peterson; Joe Gallo; John C. Flinn III; Richard Crudo; Xavier Grobet (pilot only)
- Editors: Eric Lea; Raul Davalos; Bruce Green; Brad Katz; Gregg Featherman; Janet Weinberg; Scott Melendez; Susan Kobata; Shannon Mitchell (pilot only)
- Camera setup: Single-camera
- Running time: 39–47 minutes
- Production companies: Poppy Productions; RCTV International; Electus; Warner Bros. Television; CBS Television Studios

Original release
- Network: The CW
- Release: October 13, 2014 – July 31, 2019

Related
- Jane the Virgin (Venezuelan TV series); Miss Farah – Arabic adaptation

Jane the Virgin is an American romantic comedy-drama and satirical telenovela developed by Jennie Snyder Urman. The series premiered October 13, 2014, on The CW and concluded on July 31, 2019. It is a loose adaptation of the Venezuelan telenovela Juana la virgen created by Perla Farías. It stars Gina Rodriguez as Jane Gloriana Villanueva, a devout 23-year-old Latina virgin who becomes pregnant after an accidental artificial insemination by her gynecologist. It parodies common tropes and devices in Latin American telenovelas.

Jane the Virgin received critical acclaim, particularly for its writing and Rodriguez's performance. At the 72nd Golden Globe Awards, Jane the Virgin was nominated for Best Television Series – Musical or Comedy and Gina Rodriguez won Best Actress – Television Series Musical or Comedy. The show received a Peabody Award in 2014 and was also selected as one of the top 10 television programs of 2014 by the American Film Institute.

Beginning with the fourth episode of season three, the series's on-screen title card was modified, with "The Virgin" crossed out in favor of a comedic substitution corresponding to each episode. This mirrored the storyline, in which Jane is no longer a virgin.

== Premise ==
Set in Miami, the series details the surprising and dramatic events that take place in the life of Jane Gloriana Villanueva, a hard-working, vaguely religious, young, Venezuelan-American woman with a love for writing and telenovelas. Jane's vow to her grandmother to save her virginity until marriage is complicated when a doctor mistakenly artificially inseminates her during a checkup. To make matters worse, the biological father, Rafael, is a married man, a former playboy, and a cancer survivor who is both the new owner of the hotel where Jane works and her former teenage crush. Jane's predicament is made more awkward as her mistaken insemination used Rafael's final frozen sample and is the last chance for Rafael to become a father.

In addition to adjusting to pregnancy and then her motherhood, Jane is faced with many questions about her professional career future and the daunting prospect of choosing between the father of her baby or her detective boyfriend, whom she had been with for two years before the events of the series. As the series evolves, the issues shift as her child grows into a toddler, her writing career moves forward, and her family members likewise develop independent plotlines. Some of these plotlines include issues with immigration status, health concerns, and lessons of self-discovery.

== Cast and characters ==
=== Main ===
- Gina Rodriguez as Jane Gloriana Villanueva, a 23-year-old, religious Latina virgin who becomes pregnant after being artificially inseminated by mistake. At the time she was dating Michael Cordero, a Miami police officer. She was inseminated with the last sample (that we know of) of a local hotelier, Rafael Solano, a cancer survivor. His wife, Petra, wanted to surprise Rafael with the insemination. Jane learns she is pregnant after she faints on the bus. Michael is not interested in raising another man's child. It turns out that Rafael owns the hotel where Jane is a waitress. After meeting Rafael and hearing his situation, she agrees to carry the baby full term and turn over custody to him and his wife Petra, but only if she is sure her baby will be safe and loved with them. Jane breaks off the engagement with Michael due to him keeping secrets from her regarding the Solanos. As the pregnancy proceeds, Rafael and Jane start to have feelings for each other, but the relationship doesn't last very long. Jane ends up having a baby boy named Mateo Gloriano Rogelio Solano Villanueva. She marries Michael Cordero in the season 2 finale. Midway through season 3, she becomes widowed when Michael dies from complications associated with his previous gunshot wound. She spends the next three years mourning him and trying to revive her life while raising Mateo with Rafael, who she has built a great co-parenting relationship with and who has also become her best friend. After searching for a letter which Michael wrote to her, Adam, her ex-boyfriend comes back into her life, but he soon leaves for a job offer. Meanwhile, she finds her feelings resurfacing for Rafael, and after they reunite in season 4, she marries him at the end of season 5.
  - Jenna Ortega as Young Jane, at age 10, is the most frequent (21 chapters as of season 3) of the four younger "Janes" seen in flashbacks.
- Andrea Navedo as Xiomara "Xo" Gloriana Villanueva, Jane's outgoing mother. She was only sixteen years old when she had Jane, which is why Jane would rather keep her virginity until marriage than make the same mistake her mother did. She is a dance teacher, but dreams of having a singing career. She marries Jane's father in the season 3 finale. At the end of season 4, she is diagnosed with breast cancer. She survives this, moves with Rogelio to New York for his TV-show, while she enrolls in a nursing school.
  - Catherine Toribio plays a younger Xiomara during some flashback sequences.
- Yael Grobglas as Petra Solano (née Anděl, later Dvořáček), born as Natalia, is Rafael's scheming and cheating wife. Rafael later divorces her and in season 2, she inseminates herself with Rafael's sperm and gives birth to their twin daughters, Anna and Elsa, called Ellie because Petra hates the Frozen references. She later is charged with killing her twin sister, Anezka, but falls in love with her lawyer Jane Ramos (J.R.).
- Justin Baldoni as Rafael Solano, the 31-year-old owner of the Marbella Hotel and the biological father of Jane's child, who has fallen out of love with his wife. As the series progresses, he develops growing feelings for Jane, and divorces Petra after discovering her affair. In season 2, he has two daughters with Petra and, in season three, briefly goes to jail. In season four, he and Jane grow closer and it is thought he would propose. In season 5, Jane and Rafael get married.
- Ivonne Coll as Alba Gloriana Villanueva, Jane's pious maternal grandmother. She is highly religious, and encourages Jane to save her virginity until marriage. While she is able to speak English, she only speaks Spanish with her family, even when they address her in English. She was in the country illegally until she got her green card in season 2. In season 4, she becomes a citizen of United States. She falls in love with her boss Jorge. Jorge proposes to Alba, but she denies it. Soon she realizes that that was a mistake but Jorge had moved on. At the end of season 4, Alba and Jorge marry to help him meet his mother, who lives out of the country.
- Brett Dier as Michael Cordero Jr. (seasons 1–3, 5; guest season 4), Jane's 29-year-old husband who is a police detective. He is aware of Petra's affair, and blackmails her to ensure that her marriage remains intact, so that Jane will give the baby to them, but he later decides to support Jane's decision to keep the baby. He also dislikes Rafael due to Jane's, and eventually Rafael's, attraction to one another. He is the head detective in the hunt for Sin Rostro, a high-profile drug dealer who seems to be based in the Marbella Hotel; however, he gets shot while searching for Sin Rostro, and he later quits to become a lawyer. Jane and Michael marry in the season 2 finale. He apparently dies midway through season 3 from an aortic dissection caused by a gunshot. It is revealed in the season 4 finale that Michael is still alive, however, and the season 5 premiere explains that Michael's death was staged by Rose. Michael now suffers from amnesia caused by Rose shocking parts of his brain, and now identifies as "Jason" due to severe memory loss. Michael finally gets his memories back but has changed due to being Jason for a few years. Michael and Jane try to discover if there is still anything between them. Unfortunately, too much time has passed, and Michael and Jane part ways. Michael marries his neighbor and they have a baby together.
- Jaime Camil as Rogelio de la Vega, a self-involved, famous telenovela star and Jane's biological father. He is currently trying to gain a relationship with his newly discovered daughter. He also has feelings for Xiomara, who was his girlfriend in high school. He marries Xiomara in the season 3 finale. He desperately wants a child and has one with Darci Factor. They later have the child and named it Baby Michaelina de la Vega Factor.
- Elias Janssen as Mateo Gloriano Rogelio Solano Villanueva (seasons 4–5), Jane and Rafael's baby. Named after Jane's grandfather and Alba's husband, who died before Jane was born.
  - Aria Rose Garcia as toddler Mateo Gloriano Rogelio Solano Villanueva. Joseph Sanders played the role in the third season.
- Anthony Mendez voiced the Latin Lover Narrator, who was revealed, in the series finale, to be adult Mateo (Jane and Rafael's son) as a voiceover actor narrating a telenovela. Though used in third-person omniscient, the narration featured both metanarration and metafiction.

=== Recurring ===
- Yara Martinez as Dr. Luisa Alver, Rafael's lesbian, neurotic, recovering alcoholic older sister, and the doctor who accidentally artificially inseminated Jane. She later has a relationship with her step mother, Sin Rostro/Rose.
- Bridget Regan as Rose, a former lawyer, former girlfriend of Luisa, and eventually stepmother of Luisa and Rafael who defends Luisa against the malpractice suit. She is later revealed to be the crime lord Sin Rostro, and is arrested in season three but dies in season 5.
  - Megan Ketch as Susanna Barnett (season 2), Michael's partner who was in fact Rose in disguise. After being discovered, she shot Michael in the chest. Before this she has a relationship with Luisa, but Luisa was unaware that she was actually Rose.
  - Elisabeth Röhm as Eileen (season 3), the second woman whose identity Rose steals for the next three years. In the meantime, the real Eileen murdered Scott.
- Mia and Ella Allan as Anna and Ellie Solano (seasons 3–5), Petra and Rafael's twin daughters as a result of Petra's artificial insemination.
- Carlo Rota as Emilio Solano (season 1), Luisa's biological father and Rafael's adopted father. He is murdered by his wife, Rose.
- Michael Rady as Lachlan Moore (seasons 1–2), Rafael's rival and Petra's former fiancé.
- Diane Guerrero as Lina Santillan, Jane's life-long best friend and co-worker.
- Carmen Carrera as Eva, Jane's co-worker (season 1).
- Azie Tesfai as Detective Nadine Hansan (seasons 1–2), a police detective and rival, partner, and brief lover to Michael. She was killed taking a bullet that was meant for Michael, after she was revealed to be working with Sin Rostro.
- Priscilla Barnes as Magda Anděl, Petra and Anezka's mother. She uses a wheelchair (but only pretends to be paraplegic) and she is Petra's co-conspirator in her plot to steal Rafael's hotel and wealth. While imprisoned, she was still working against Petra from inside with Anezka; she is now out.
- Yael Grobglas also portrays Anežka (seasons 2–4), Petra's long-lost twin sister who grew up with a rough life in the Czech Republic. She grows close to Petra at first but then, at the end of the second season she drugs Petra and begins a scheme with Magda to impersonate Petra so they can gain controlling shares in the Marbella. She later marries Scott, the manager of the Lounge, but they split up and she leaves for the Czech Republic. After four years, she returns to Miami in season 3, and is arrested for being a person of interest in her late husband's death, before being released and plan to return to the Czech Republic. However, after finding out Petra was the reason she breaks up with Scott and ultimately indirectly causing his death, she teams up with Luisa in a scheme to sell the Marbella. Then, after successfully convincing Luisa she was hallucinating and getting her to commit herself to a wellness center, she becomes the acting owner of the Marbella, and she briefly fakes her own death to see who actually cares about her, before falling to her death after an altercation with her sister in season 4. It's revealed in the season 4 finale that Anežka was actually murdered by Petra, after she had threatened her children.
- Adam Rodriguez as Jonathan Chavez (seasons 2, 4) Jane's teacher at grad school and a brief love interest. Later found out that he is known for affairs with students.
- Alano Miller as Roman Zazo (season 1), Rafael's best friend and Petra's lover. He is believed to be murdered in the hotel, causing tension for everyone, including Petra and Rafael.
  - Miller also portrays Aaron Zazo (season 1), Roman's twin brother, who appears from "Chapter Fourteen" onwards investigating his brother's murder, is later revealed to be Roman; it was Aaron who was murdered. Roman is later killed, in self-defense, by Petra.
- Shelly Bhalla as Krishna (seasons 2–5), Petra's assistant, formerly Rafael's assistant. She is believed to be blackmailing Petra in season 4, but it turns out that she was the one being blackmailed.
- Ricardo Chavira as Bruce (season 3), Xiomara's boyfriend of three years who she becomes briefly engaged to, only to break things off due to her lingering feelings for Rogelio.
- Justina Machado as Darci Factor (seasons 3–5), Rogelio's ex-girlfriend and the mother of her and Rogelio's daughter "Baby Michaelina de la Vega Factor". She runs a matchmaking business.
- Alfonso DiLuca as Jorge (seasons 3–5), Alba's love interest, co-worker and later boyfriend who eventually becomes her husband.
- Johnny Messner as Chuck Chesser (seasons 3–4), the new owner of the rival hotel to the Marbella who serves as a new love interest for Petra.
- Francisco San Martín as Fabian (seasons 3–4), Rogelio's costar on telenovela Los Viajes de Guillermo who has a brief fling with Jane.
- Tyler Posey as Adam Alvaro (seasons 3–4), Jane's first love and later boyfriend, who is bisexual.
- Rosario Dawson as Jane Ramos (seasons 4–5), Petra's attorney and love interest who broke up with her to pursue a job in Texas, but they later reunite in season 5.

== Episodes ==
Season	Episodes	Originally released	
Season	Episodes	First released	Last released
1	22	October 13, 2014	May 11, 2015
2	22	October 12, 2015	May 16, 2016
3	20	October 17, 2016	May 22, 2017
4	17	October 13, 2017	April 20, 2018
5	19	March 27, 2019	July 31, 2019

== Production ==
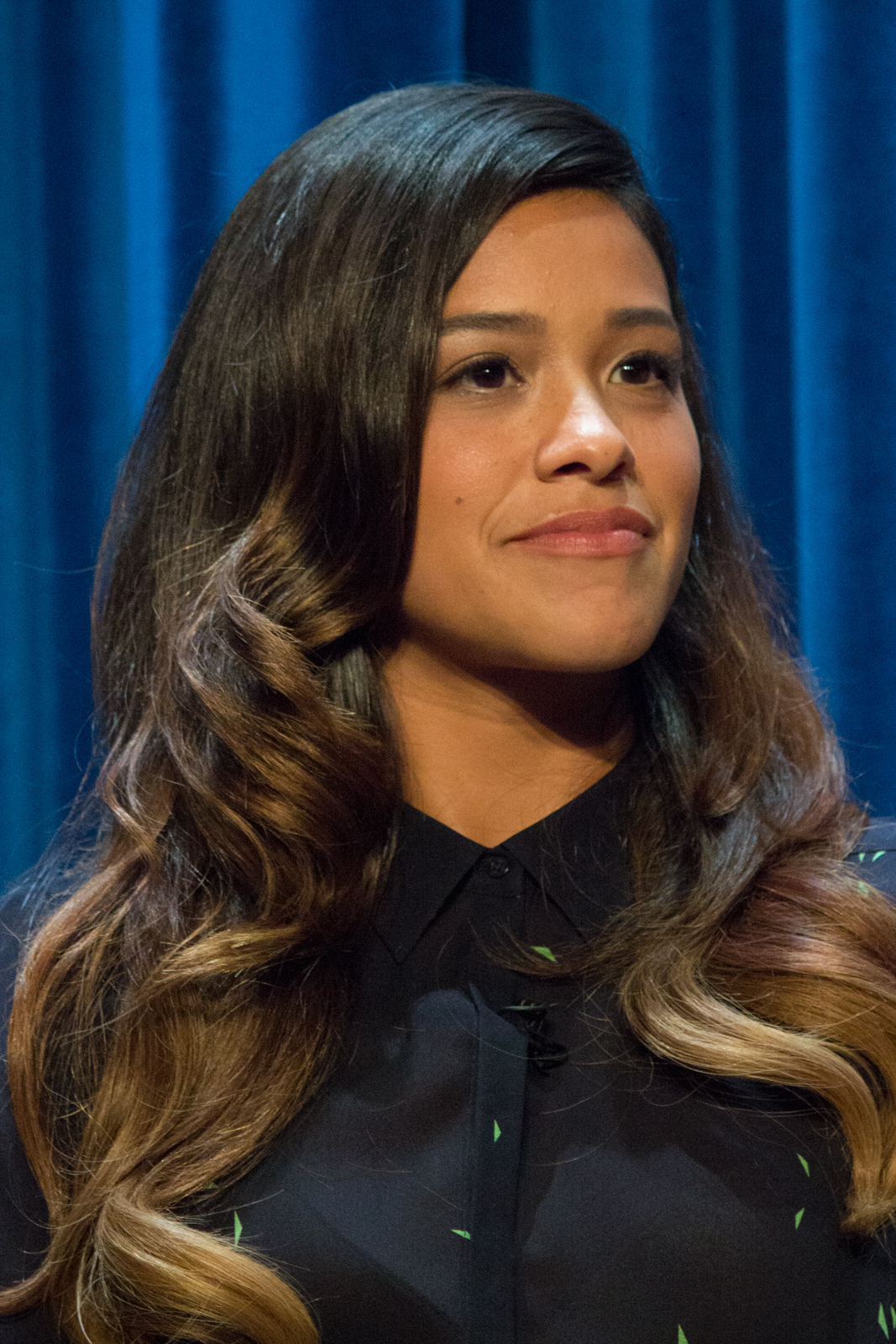
Gina Rodriguez portrays the title role.

On June 27, 2013, The CW announced that it was planning to release a new show based on the Venezuelan telenovela Juana La Virgen. On February 23, 2014, Entertainment Weekly announced that Rodriguez would play the title role of Jane Villanueva. On May 8, 2014, during The CW's 2014–2015 upfronts, the series was officially picked up. and on July 18, 2014, an extended trailer was released by The CW. On August 8, 2014, it was announced that White Collar's Bridget Regan and Azie Tesfai would join the series as respectively Rose, a former lawyer, and Detective Nadine Hansan, a police detective and rival to Dier's character. On August 10, 2014, TVLine announced that Melrose Place and Emily Owens, M.D. actor Michael Rady would join the series as Lachlan. Filming for season one commenced on July 28, 2014. The show is filmed on soundstages in Los Angeles and the pilot was filmed in Huntington Beach, California. On October 21, 2014, the show was given a full season order. On January 11, 2015, the show was renewed for a second season, set to air during the 2015–16 television season. Its second season premiered on October 12, 2015. On March 11, 2016, the show was renewed for a third season, which premiered on October 17, 2016. On January 8, 2017, The CW renewed the series for a fourth season that premiered on October 13, 2017. On April 2, 2018, The CW renewed the series for a fifth and final season, which premiered on March 27, 2019.

== Release ==
=== Broadcast ===
Jane the Virgin premiered on The CW on October 13, 2014, during the 2014–15 television season. Unique to the CW, it is the network's only program to feature a Spanish language audio track on the second audio program channel; however, as many CW stations usually do not carry the SAP channel due to a lack of need, this is more limited than the major networks, which are required by the FCC to have a SAP channel for the Descriptive Video Service track, which as a minor network the CW is not required to carry.

The series was aired on Sony Channel in Asia, Balkans and Bulgaria on FOX Life.

In the United Kingdom, every series is available to watch on ITVX.

=== Home media ===
Warner Home Video originally released Season 1 on DVD, but poor sales caused a switch in distribution rights with CBS (distributed by Paramount Home Entertainment) now releasing every season of Jane the Virgin as manufacture-on-demand Blu-ray and DVDs exclusively on Amazon going forward in addition to a manufacture-on-demand reissue of Season 1.

Name	DVD		Blu-ray	No. of episodes	Features
Name	Region 1	Region 4	Region A	No. of episodes	Features
The Complete First Season	September 29, 2015	March 1, 2017	October 13, 2017	22	Immaculate Creation – 'Behind the Scenes'; Getting to Know the Cast; Gag reel; Deleted scenes
The Complete Second Season	June 16, 2017	March 1, 2017	December 22, 2017	22	
The Complete Third Season	January 19, 2018	September 6, 2017	January 19, 2018	20	Deleted scenes
The Complete Fourth Season	December 3, 2018	June 6, 2018		17	
The Complete Fifth Season	July 28, 2020			19	

== Reception ==
=== Critical response ===
Critical response of Jane the Virgin
Season	Rotten Tomatoes	Metacritic
1	100% (56 reviews)	80 (23 reviews)
2	100% (13 reviews)	87 (4 reviews)
3	100% (15 reviews)	—N/a
4	100% (22 reviews)	—N/a
5	100% (27 reviews)	—N/a

Review aggregator website Rotten Tomatoes gave the first season of the show a rating of 100% based on 56 reviews, with a rating average of 7.70 out of 10. The site's consensus states, "Jane the Virgin's dubious premise has become part of its unlikely charm – along with delightfully diverse writing and a knockout performance by Gina Rodriguez." Metacritic, another review aggregator, gives the show a score of 80 out of 100, based on 23 reviews.

On Metacritic, the second season holds an 87 out of 100, based on 4 reviews. Rotten Tomatoes gave it a rating of 100% based on 13 reviews and a rating average of 9.70 out of 10. The site's consensus reads, "Jane the Virgin stays true to its over-the-top telenovela roots in season two while layering in more humor and increasingly complex storytelling." Maureen Ryan of Variety praised the show, saying that the series "is envisioned, edited and curated with great deftness and economy, and the fact that it is so entertaining and accessible should not preclude it from being at the center of conversations about the best the medium has to offer".

==== Critics' top ten lists ====
2014
- No. 3 TV Guide
- No. 3 The Salt Lake Tribune
- No. 6 TV.com
- No. 7 Las Vegas Weekly
- No. 8 Sioux City Journal
- No. 10 Boston Globe
- – American Film Institute
- – Associated Press
- – Chicago Reader
- – Huffington Post
- – Los Angeles Times
- – Philadelphia Daily News
- – ScreenCrush

2015
- No. 3 Village Voice
- No. 4 Vulture
- No. 4 Slate
- No. 5 The Salt Lake Tribune
- No. 6 Las Vegas Weekly
- No. 7 TV.com
- – Boob Tube Dude
- – Criticwire
- – Variety
- – The Week

2016
- No. 1 Variety
- No. 2 Boob Tube Dude
- No. 8 MTV
- – CNN

2017
- No. 6 Variety
- No. 9 TV by the Numbers
- No. 9 USA Today

2018
- No. 7 Vulture
- No. 9 Paste
- – The New Yorker
- – E!

=== Ratings ===
Viewership and ratings per season of Jane the Virgin
Season	Timeslot (ET)	Episodes	First aired		Last aired		TV season	Viewership rank	Avg. viewers (millions)	18–49 rank	Avg. 18–49 rating
Season	Timeslot (ET)	Episodes	Date	Viewers (millions)	Date	Viewers (millions)	TV season	Viewership rank	Avg. viewers (millions)	18–49 rank	Avg. 18–49 rating
1	Monday 9:00 pm	22	October 13, 2014	1.61	May 11, 2015	1.24	2014–15	177	1.55	164	0.6
2	Monday 9:00 pm	22	October 12, 2015	1.06	May 16, 2016	0.97	2015–16	180	1.48	163	0.6
3	Monday 9:00 pm	20	October 17, 2016	1.09	May 22, 2017	0.96	2016–17	155	1.60	142	0.7
4	Friday 9:00pm	17	October 13, 2017	0.68	April 20, 2018	0.58	2017–18	193	1.23	155	0.5
5	Wednesday 9:00 pm	19	March 27, 2019	0.79	July 31, 2019	0.65	2018–19	TBD	TBD	TBD	TBD

Jane the Virgin : U.S. viewers per episode (millions)
Audience measurement performed by Nielsen Media Research

=== Accolades ===
The show has been acknowledged by the People's Choice Awards, Golden Globe Awards, Critics' Choice Awards, the Primetime Emmy Awards, the Image Awards and the Television Critics Association as well as honored by the American Film Institute and the George Foster Peabody Awards.

Year	Award	Category	Nominee(s)	Result
2014	America Film Institute Award	AFI Television Program Of The Year	Jane the Virgin	Won
2014	TV Guide Award	Favorite New Show	Jane the Virgin	Nominated
2015	People's Choice Award	Favorite New TV Comedy	Jane the Virgin	Won
2015	Golden Globe Award	Best Television Series – Musical or Comedy	Jane the Virgin	Nominated
2015	Golden Globe Award	Best Actress – Television Series Musical or Comedy	Gina Rodriguez	Won
2015	Peabody Award	Honoree	Jane the Virgin	Won
2015	Critics' Choice Award	Best Comedy Series	Jane the Virgin	Nominated
2015	Critics' Choice Award	Best Actress in a Comedy Series	Gina Rodriguez	Nominated
2015	Critics' Choice Award	Best Supporting Actor in a Comedy Series	Jaime Camil	Nominated
2015	Golden Reel Award	Best Sound Editing	Susan Ham, Sharyn Gersh	Nominated
2015	TVLine Performer of the Week	Honoree	Jaime Camil ("Chapter Twelve")	Won
2015	TVLine Performer of the Week	Honoree	Gina Rodriguez ("Chapter Twenty")	Won
2015	Teen Choice Award	Choice TV Actor: Comedy	Jaime Camil	Nominated
2015	Teen Choice Award	Choice TV Actress: Comedy	Gina Rodriguez	Nominated
2015	Teen Choice Award	Choice TV: Breakout Show	Jane the Virgin	Nominated
2015	Teen Choice Award	Choice TV: Breakout Star	Gina Rodriguez	Nominated
2015	Teen Choice Award	Choice TV: Liplock	Gina Rodriguez & Justin Baldoni	Nominated
2015	Television Critics Association Award	Outstanding New Program	Jane the Virgin	Nominated
2015	Television Critics Association Award	Outstanding Achievement in Comedy	Jane the Virgin	Nominated
2015	Television Critics Association Award	Individual Achievement in Comedy	Gina Rodriguez	Nominated
2015	Imagen Award	Best Primetime Television Program – Comedy	Jane the Virgin	Won
2015	Imagen Award	Best Actress – Television	Gina Rodriguez	Won
2015	Imagen Award	Best Supporting Actor – Television	Justin Baldoni	Nominated
2015	Imagen Award	Best Supporting Actor – Television	Jaime Camil	Nominated
2015	Imagen Award	Best Supporting Actress – Television	Ivonne Coll	Nominated
2015	Imagen Award	Best Supporting Actress – Television	Andrea Navedo	Won
2015	Gold Derby Award	Best Comedy Series	Jane the Virgin	Nominated
2015	Gold Derby Award	Best Comedy Lead Actress	Gina Rodriguez	Nominated
2015	Gold Derby Award	Breakthrough Performer	Gina Rodriguez	Won
2015	EWwy Award	Best Comedy Series	Jane the Virgin	Won
2015	EWwy Award	Best Actress – Comedy	Gina Rodriguez	Won
2015	EWwy Award	Best Supporting Actor – Comedy	Jaime Camil	Nominated
2015	Emmy Award	Outstanding Narrator	Anthony Mendez	Nominated
2015	Voice Arts Award	Outstanding Narration – TV or Film, Best Voice-Over	Anthony Mendez	Won
2015	Gotham Award	Breakthrough Series – Long Form	Jane the Virgin	Nominated
2015	Dorian Award	Campy TV Show of the Year	Jane the Virgin	Won
2015	Online Film and Television Association Award	Best Actress	Gina Rodriguez	Nominated
2015	Online Film and Television Association Award	Best Guest Actress	Rita Moreno	Won
2015	Maxwell Weinberg Award		Arpi Ketendjian; CBS Studios	Won
2015	NHMC Impact Gala Award	Honoree	Gina Rodriguez	Won
2015	HOLA Award	Breakthrough Performance	Andrea Navedo	Won
2015	GiRL POWER Media Role Model Award	Honoree	Gina Rodriguez	Won
2015	GiRL POWER Media Role Model Award	Honoree	Andrea Navedo	Won
2015	GiRL POWER Media Role Model Award	Honoree	Ivonne Coll	Won
2015	International Drama Award	Best Mini-Series	Jane the Virgin	Nominated
2015	International Drama Award	Best Actress	Gina Rodriguez	Nominated
2015	International Drama Award	Best Director	Brad Silberling	Nominated
2015	Paleyfest LA	Honoree	Jane the Virgin	Won
2016	Satellite Award	Best Television Series – Musical or Comedy	Jane the Virgin	Nominated
2016	Satellite Award	Best Actress – Television Series Musical or Comedy	Gina Rodriguez	Nominated
2016	NAACP Image Award	Outstanding Actress in a Comedy Series	Gina Rodriguez	Nominated
2016	NAACP Image Award	Outstanding Writing in a Comedy Series	Jennie Snyder Urman	Nominated
2016	NAACP Image Award	Outstanding Directing in a Comedy Series	Brad Silberling	Nominated
2016	Golden Globe Award	Best Actress – Television Series Musical or Comedy	Gina Rodriguez	Nominated
2016	Critics' Choice Award	Best Comedy Series	Jane the Virgin	Nominated
2016	Critics' Choice Award	Best Actress in a Comedy Series	Gina Rodriguez	Nominated
2016	Critics' Choice Award	Best Supporting Actor in a Comedy Series	Jaime Camil	Nominated
2016	TVLine Performer of the Week	Honoree	Yael Grobglas ("Chapter Thirty-Six")	Nominated
2016	Golden Reel Award	Best Sound Editing	Susan Ham, Sharyn Gersh	Nominated
2016	GMS Award	Best Music Supervision	Kevin J. Edelman	Nominated
2016	The Women's Image Award	Best Actress in a Comedy	Gina Rodriguez	Nominated
2016	The Women's Image Award	Best Comedy Series	Jane the Virgin	Nominated
2016	The Women's Image Award	Outstanding Writing in a Series	Jennie Snyder Urman ("Chapter One: Pilot")	Nominated
2016	Artios Award	Outstanding Achievement in Casting - Comedy	Alyson Silverberg, Jonathan Clay Harris	Nominated
2016	Frijolywood Award /Frijoldeoro Award	Screenwriter in Comedy	Carolina Rivera	Won
2016	Frijolywood Award /Frijoldeoro Award	Best Supporting Actor in a Comedy Series	Jaime Camil	Won
2016	NHMC Impact Award	Outstanding Performance in a Comedy Series	Andrea Navedo	Won
2016	Cine Award	Best Comedy Series	Jane the Virgin	Nominated
2016	Cine Award	Best Actress in a Comedy Series	Gina Rodriguez	Nominated
2016	Cine Award	Best Supporting Actor	Jaime Camil	Nominated
2016	Cine Award	Best Supporting Actress	Ivonne Coll	Won
2016	Young Artist Award	Best Performance in a TV Series	Madison Rojas	Nominated
2016	Teen Choice Award	Choice TV: Comedy	Jane the Virgin	Nominated
2016	Teen Choice Award	Choice TV: Actor	Jaime Camil	Nominated
2016	Teen Choice Award	Choice TV: Actress	Gina Rodriguez	Nominated
2016	Emmy Award	Outstanding Narrator	Anthony Mendez	Nominated
2016	EWwy Award	Best Actress – Comedy	Gina Rodriguez	Nominated
2016	EWwy Award	Best Supporting Actor – Comedy	Jaime Camil	Nominated
2016	Imagen Award	Best Primetime Television Program – Comedy	Jane the Virgin	Won
2016	Imagen Award	Best Actress – Television	Gina Rodriguez	Won
2016	Imagen Award	Best Supporting Actor in a Comedy Series	Jaime Camil	Won
2016	Imagen Award	Best Supporting Actress in a Comedy Series	Andrea Navedo	Nominated
2016	TVLine Performer of the Week	Honoree	Gina Rodriguez ("Chapter Forty-Seven")	Won
2017	Golden Globe Award	Best Actress – Television Series Musical or Comedy	Gina Rodriguez	Nominated
2017	People's Choice Award	Favorite TV Comedy	Jane the Virgin	Nominated
2017	People's Choice Award	Favorite TV Comedy Actress	Gina Rodriguez	Nominated
2017	Black Reel Award	Outstanding Actress, Comedy Series	Gina Rodriguez	Nominated
2017	MTV Award	Best American Story	Jane the Virgin	Nominated
2017	MTV Award	Best Actor in a Show	Gina Rodriguez	Nominated
2017	GMS Award	Best Music Supervision	Kevin J. Edelman	Nominated
2017	Teen Choice Award	Choice Comedy TV Show	Jane the Virgin	Nominated
2017	Teen Choice Award	Choice Comedy TV Actress	Gina Rodriguez	Nominated
2017	Teen Choice Award	Choice Comedy TV Actor	Jaime Camil	Nominated
2017	Imagen Award	Best Primetime Television Program – Comedy	Jane the Virgin	Nominated
2017	Imagen Award	Best Supporting Actor in a Comedy Series	Jaime Camil	Nominated
2017	Imagen Award	Best Supporting Actress in a Comedy Series	Ivonne Coll	Nominated
2018
2018	TVLine Performer of the Week	Honoree	Andrea Navedo ("Chapter Seventy-Eight")	Won
2018	MTV Award	Best Kiss	Gina Rodriguez & Justin Baldoni	Nominated
2018	Teen Choice Award	Choice Comedy TV Show	Jane the Virgin	Nominated
2018	Teen Choice Award	Choice Comedy TV Actress	Gina Rodriguez	Won
2018	Teen Choice Award	Choice Comedy TV Actor	Jaime Camil	Won
2018	Teen Choice Award	Choice Liplock	Gina Rodriguez & Justin Baldoni	Nominated
2018	Imagen Award	Best Primetime Television Program – Comedy	Jane the Virgin	Nominated
2018	Imagen Award	Best Supporting Actor in a Comedy Series	Jaime Camil	Nominated
2018	ALMA Award	Favorite TV Comedy Show	Jane the Virgin	Won
2019	TVLine Performer of the Week	Honoree	Gina Rodriguez ("Chapter Eighty-Two")	Won
2019	MTV Award	Best Performance in a Show	Gina Rodriguez	Nominated
2019	Imagen Award	Best Primetime Television Program – Comedy	Jane the Virgin	Nominated
2019	Imagen Award	Best Actress in a Comedy Series	Gina Rodriguez	Nominated
2019	Imagen Award	Best Young Actor in a Television Series	Elias Janssen	Nominated
2019	TVLine Performer of the Week	Honoree	Bridget Regan ("Chapter Ninety-Eight")	Nominated
2019	TVLine Performer of the Week	Honoree	Justin Baldoni ("Chapter One Hundred")	Nominated
2019	Teen Choice Award	Choice Comedy TV Show	Jane the Virgin	Nominated
2019	Teen Choice Award	Choice Comedy TV Actress	Gina Rodriguez	Nominated
2019	Teen Choice Award	Choice Comedy TV Actor	Jaime Camil	Won
2019	NAACP Image Awards	Outstanding Directing in a Comedy Series	Gina Rodriguez ("Chapter Seventy-Four")	Nominated

== Novel ==
A tie-in novel, based on the book Jane writes in the show, has been published. The story is a historical romance set in Miami during 1902. In the series, the book's plot is inspired by the love story of Jane and Michael.

Title	Published	Publisher
Snow Falling	November 14, 2017	Simon & Schuster

== International adaptations ==
The international rights are distributed by Propagate Content.

Country	Local title	Channel	Date aired/premiered
Arab world	Miss Farah (Arabic: الآنسة فرح, lit. 'El Anesa Farah - Al Anisa Farah') (Arabic)	MBC 4, MBC+ Variety, Shahid.net and Dubai One	December 29, 2019

== Cancelled spin-off ==
On December 3, 2018, it was announced that The CW was developing a possible spin-off of the series to launch in the 2019–20 television series. The potential series was conceived and written by Jane the Virgin writer and co-executive producer Valentina L. Garza as "a soapy, telenovela-inspired anthology series in the tradition of [its parent series] where each season was based on a different fictional novel [written by] Jane and narrated by Gina Rodriguez, who would reprise her role in the spin-off. On January 23, 2019, the spin-off, titled Jane the Novela, was ordered to pilot at The CW. In February 2019, it was announced that Jacqueline Grace Lopez was cast as the main character, Estela. On March 7, 2019, it was announced that Marcia Cross was cast as Renata. On March 15, 2019 Hunter Parrish was cast as Felix, one of two male leads. Remy Hii was cast as the second male lead Luen on March 19, 2019.

On May 7, 2019, it was announced that the spin-off would not be moving forward.

== Remake ==
An Arabic remake of the series titled Miss Farah, starring Asmaa Abulyazeid in the titular role, was released on December 29, 2019. It premiered on MBC 4, Shahid.net. Dubai One was developing their own version of the series, Jane the Virgin with Sally Wally along with their production company, S Productions in partnership with Propagate Content. The series was greenlit for a 110-episodes of fifth and final season.

A Korean remake titled Woori the Virgin consisting of 14 episodes started airing on SBS TV on 9 May 2022.

An official Indian Hindi-language remake of the series titled Oops! Ab Kya? (Translation: "Oops! Now What?") was released on JioHotstar. The first season, consisting of 8 episodes, premiered on 20 February 2025, with Shweta Basu Prasad playing the titular role

The American series is itself based on the 2002 Venezuelan telenovela, Juana La Virgen.
