= Topher Grace =

American actor (born 1978)

- Grace in 2026
- Born: Christopher John Grace; July 12, 1978 (age 48); New York City, U.S.
- Occupation: Actor
- Years active: 1998–present
- Spouse: Ashley Hinshaw (m. 2016)
- Children: 3
- Awards: Full list

Christopher John "Topher" Grace (/ˈtoʊfər/ TOH-fər; born July 12, 1978), is an American actor. He is known for his roles as Eric Forman in the sitcom That '70s Show (1998–2005) and Eddie Brock / Venom in the film Spider-Man 3 (2007). He has also starred in the films Traffic (2000), Mona Lisa Smile (2003), p.s. (2004), Win a Date with Tad Hamilton! (2004), In Good Company (2004), Valentine's Day (2010), and Predators (2010).

Grace also played the lead role in the ABC comedy series Home Economics (2021–2023) and has had supporting roles in films such as Interstellar (2014), BlacKkKlansman (2018), and Heretic (2024).

== Early life ==
Christopher John Grace was born in New York City on July 12, 1978. His mother, Pat, was the assistant to New Canaan Country School's headmaster; his father, John Grace, was a Madison Avenue executive. He has a sister named Jenny. His mother is of Irish descent, while his paternal grandmother came from a German-Jewish family with links to the Polish town of Kępno. Grace was raised an Episcopalian.

He grew up in Darien, Connecticut, where he became friends with Kate Bosworth in middle school and was babysat by Chloë Sevigny, who later appeared with him in high school plays.

== Career ==
Grace was cast as Eric Forman on Fox's That '70s Show, which debuted in 1998. He played the role regularly until the show's 7th season, when his character was written out and replaced with a new character named Randy Pearson (Josh Meyers). Grace made a brief guest appearance in the final episode. Reflecting on his experience working on the show in 2018, Grace described it as being "like a boot camp [...] for acting." He explained: "There's a filmic element, so you learn that. There's a live audience, so there's kind of a theater element. And when you suck, which you do — especially, like me, if you've never acted before — you get back up next week, do another show. And I think everyone on that show would tell you that over four or five years, we got good."

Grace played a prep school student who introduces his girlfriend to freebasing in director Steven Soderbergh's 2000 film Traffic, as well as having uncredited cameos as himself in Soderbergh's Ocean's Eleven and its 2004 sequel, Ocean's Twelve. "The joke is that you're supposed to play the worst version of yourself and I don't think too many people are comfortable with that. I never thought for a second that people were really going to think that's what I was like. I think that people will know that I was faking it in those movies", he told Flaunt magazine in 2007.

He planned to cameo in Ocean's Thirteen. However, due to his role in Spider-Man 3, he had to abandon these plans. As Grace said, "I was doing reshoots on Spider-Man 3. I was bummed. I actually talked to Steven Soderbergh about that and we had a thing and then I couldn't do it." He appeared in director Mike Newell's 2003 film Mona Lisa Smile.

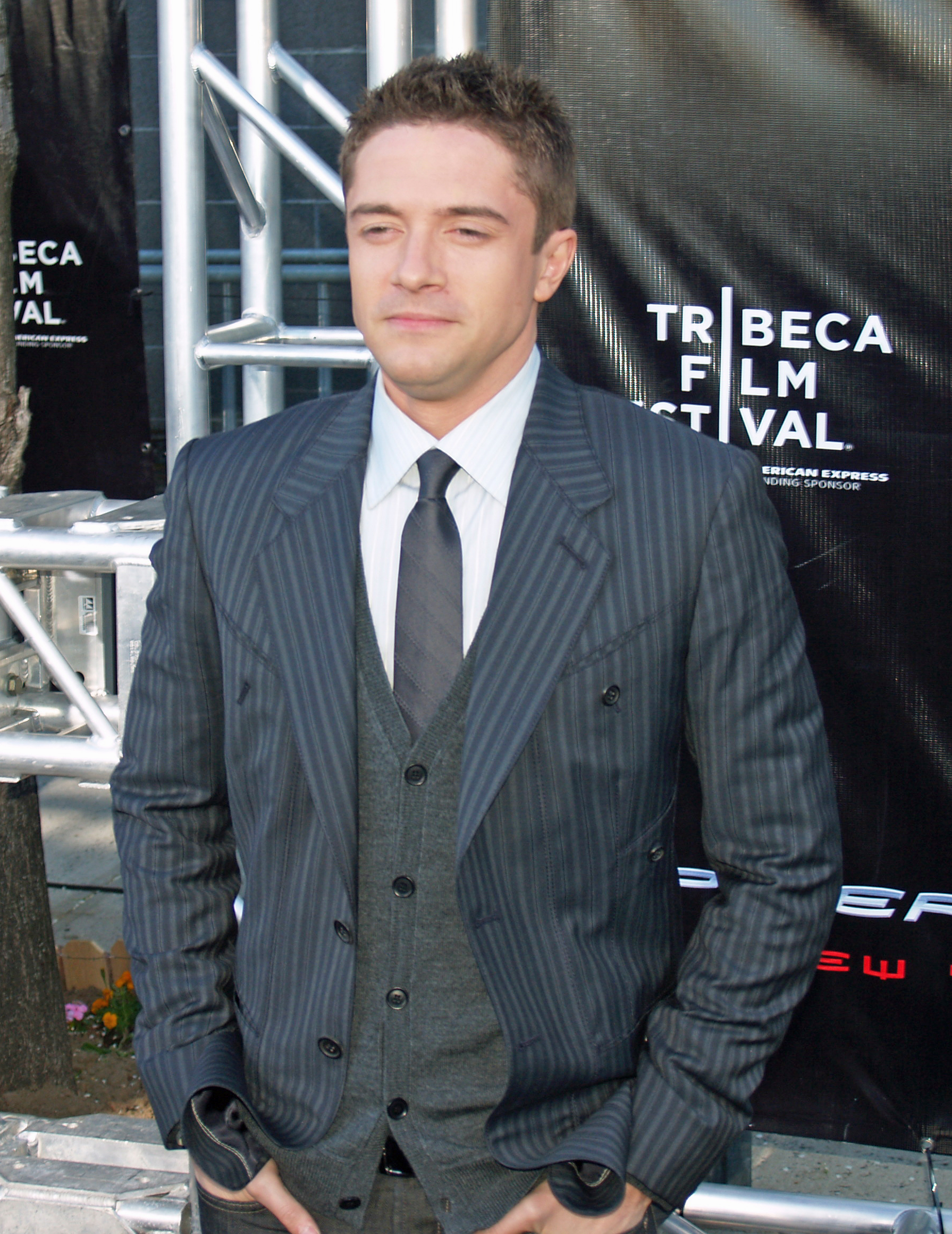
Grace at the Spider-Man 3 premiere, April 2007

In 2004, Grace played the leading roles in Win a Date with Tad Hamilton! and In Good Company. That same year, he starred in P.S., which received only a limited theatrical release. Grace won the National Board of Review's 2004 award for Breakthrough Performance Actor for his work in In Good Company and P.S.

On January 15, 2005, Grace hosted Saturday Night Live.

In 2007, Grace portrayed Eddie Brock/Venom in Spider-Man 3, directed by Sam Raimi. Grace himself was a fan of the comics and read the Venom stories as a child. In 2009, Grace became the subject of a recurring column on the entertainment/pop culture site Videogum, entitled "What's Up With Topher Grace?"

In 2010, Grace appeared in the ensemble comedy Valentine's Day and played the character of Edwin in Predators.

In 2011, Grace appeared in the 1980s retro comedy Take Me Home Tonight. He co-wrote the script and co-produced the film. Grace also starred opposite Richard Gere in the spy thriller The Double.

In 2012, Grace starred alongside Mary Elizabeth Winstead and Matthew Gray Gubler in the social film The Beauty Inside, which won a Daytime Emmy Award for Outstanding New Approach to an Original Daytime Program or Series in 2013. The film was directed by Drake Doremus and written by Richard Greenberg.

In 2014, Grace starred in the indie thriller The Calling, alongside Susan Sarandon, and appeared in Christopher Nolan's sci-fi adventure Interstellar, in a supporting role.

In October 2013, Grace joined HBO comedy pilot People in New Jersey with Sarah Silverman, but in January 2014, the pilot was passed on.

Grace co-starred in the comedy film American Ultra (2015), alongside Jesse Eisenberg and Kristen Stewart, playing a CIA agent. That same year, he co-starred in Truth, with Robert Redford and Cate Blanchett, based on the story of CBS's 60 Minutes report that George W. Bush had received preferential treatment to keep him out of the Vietnam War. Grace played Mike Smith, a researcher on the story.

In January 2018, Grace joined the supernatural-thriller Delirium, which centers on a man recently released from a mental institute who inherits a mansion after his parents die. After a series of disturbing events, he comes to believe it is haunted. In August 2018, Grace portrayed David Duke in the biographical crime film BlacKkKlansman, directed by Spike Lee, alongside John David Washington and Adam Driver. In 2019, he played Billy Bauer in the 2nd episode of Black Mirror’s 5th season, titled "Smithereens". In 2020, Grace was cast in ABC's Home Economics pilot. On April 30, 2022, it was announced that Grace would have a guest appearance in the follow-up sitcom, That '90s Show. In 2024, Grace starred in the horror film Heretic and in 2025, he starred in the action thriller Flight Risk.

== Other ventures ==
Grace has long held an interest in making fan edits of popular films, particularly those involving Star Wars. He has stated that this has become a source of relaxation for him. His edits were shared on his now-defunct pop-culture website Cereal Prize.

In 2012, he edited the Star Wars prequel trilogy into one 85-minute film, titled Star Wars: Episode III.5: The Editor Strikes Back and showed it to select audiences. The edit utilized original footage, music from The Clone Wars animated series, and a portion from Anthony Daniels' audiobook recordings.

In 2014, he created a cut of Boogie Nights that served as a reconstruction of the character Brock Landers' fake movie Angels Live in My Town.

In 2018, he created his own edit of The Hobbit, stating that "I think that maybe The Hobbit should've been one movie, and many people would agree. Money drives a lot of those franchises. It's better when the art leads." He specifically edited this as a way to relax while portraying David Duke in Spike Lee's BlacKkKlansman.

In 2019, Grace and editor Jeff Yorkes started a Twitter account for "Lou's Cafe", the pseudonym by which the two credit their work. The name comes from the diner featured in the film Back to the Future. Later that year, he and Yorkes were commissioned by Pixar to edit a retrospective for Toy Story 4, which was titled "Toy Story 4 Ever" and released on Pixar's YouTube account.

== Personal life ==
Grace started dating actress Ashley Hinshaw in January 2014. They were engaged in January 2015 and married near Santa Barbara, California, on May 29, 2016. They have three children.

Grace is a supporter of the microfinance organization FINCA International.

== Filmography ==
=== Film ===
Key
†	Denotes films that have not yet been released

Year	Title	Role	Notes
2000	Traffic	Seth Abrahams	
2001	Ocean's Eleven	Himself	Uncredited cameo
2002	Pinocchio	Leonardo	Voice role (English dub)
2003	Mona Lisa Smile	Tommy Donegal	
2004	Win a Date with Tad Hamilton!	Pete Monash	
2004	P.S.	F. Scott Feinstadt	
2004	Ocean's Twelve	Himself	Uncredited cameo
2004	In Good Company	Carter Duryea	
2007	Spider-Man 3	Eddie Brock / Venom	
2008	Personal Effects	Clay	Voice role; uncredited
2010	Valentine's Day	Jason Morris	
2010	Predators	Edwin	
2011	Take Me Home Tonight	Matt Franklin	Also writer and executive producer
2011	The Double	Ben Geary	
2012	The Giant Mechanical Man	Doug	
2013	The Big Wedding	Jared Griffin	
2014	Don Peyote	Glavin Culpepper	
2014	The Calling	Ben Wingate	
2014	Playing It Cool	Scott	
2014	Interstellar	Getty	
2015	American Ultra	Agent Adrian Yates	
2015	Truth	Mike Smith	
2017	The Institute	Vincent	
2017	War Machine	Matt Little	
2017	Opening Night	Nick	Also producer
2018	Delirium	Tom	
2018	BlacKkKlansman	David Duke	
2018	Under the Silver Lake	Man at Bar	
2019	Mississippi Requiem	TBA	
2019	Breakthrough	Pastor Jason Noble	
2020	Irresistible	Kurt Farlander	
2024	Heretic	Elder Kennedy	
2025	Flight Risk	Winston	
2026	Buddy	Ben Gardner	
2026	How to Make a Killing	Pastor Steven J. Redfellow	
2026	Never Change!	Mr. Whiley	
2026	Misty Green	Randy	

=== Television ===
Year	Title	Role	Notes
1998–2005; 2006	That '70s Show	Eric Forman	Main role (seasons 1–7); Uncredited cameo (season 8)
2003	King of the Hill	Chris	Voice role; episode: "Megalo Dale"
2005	Saturday Night Live	Himself / Host	Episode: "Topher Grace / The Killers"
2005	Stella	Older Kevin	Episode: "Paper Route"
2005	Robot Chicken	Eric Forman	Voice role; episode: "Gold Dust Gasoline"
2008	The Simpsons	Donny	Voice role; episode: "The Debarted"
2011	Too Big to Fail	Jim Wilkinson	Television film
2012	Comedy Bang! Bang!	Cameraman	Episode: "Seth Rogen Wears a Plaid Shirt & Brown Pants"
2012	The Beauty Inside	Alex	6 episodes
2013	People in New Jersey	Carl Levin	Unsold TV pilot
2015	The Muppets	Himself	Episode: Pilot
2015	Drunk History	Milton Bradley	Episode: "Games"
2016	TripTank	Leonard	Voice role; episode: "Sick Day"
2017	Workaholics	Noel	Episode: "Weed the People"
2017	Get Shorty	Tyler Mathis	2 episodes
2019	Love, Death & Robots	Rob	Episode: "Ice Age"
2019	The Hot Zone	Dr. Peter Jahrling	Miniseries
2019	Black Mirror	Billy Bauer	Episode: "Smithereens"
2020	The Twilight Zone	Mark	Episode: "Try, Try"
2021–2023	Home Economics	Tom	Main role
2023	That '90s Show	Eric Forman	Episode: "That '90s Pilot"
2024	The Simpsons	Billy O'Donnell	Voice role; episode: "Shoddy Heat"
2025	The Waterfront	Grady	Recurring role

=== Music videos ===
- In the Street (1999) by Cheap Trick, as Eric Forman
- Don't You Want Me Baby (2011) from Atomic Tom, as Himself

=== Video games ===
- Spider-Man 3 (2007), as Eddie Brock / Venom

== Stage ==
- Lonely, I'm Not (2012), as Porter, at Second Stage Theatre

== Awards and nominations ==
=== Film ===
Year	Nominated work	Award	Result
2001	Traffic	Screen Actors Guild Award for Outstanding Performance by a Cast on a Motion Picture	Won
2001	Traffic	Young Artist Award for Breakthrough Performance – Male	Won
2004	In Good Company P.S.	National Board of Review Award for Breakthrough Performance by an Actor	Won
2004	In Good Company P.S.	New York Film Critics Circle Online Award for Breakthrough Performance	Won
2004	Win a Date with Tad Hamilton!	Teen Choice Award for Choice Movie Actor – Comedy	Nominated
2004	Win a Date with Tad Hamilton!	Teen Choice Award for Choice Movie – Hissy Fit	Nominated
2004	Win a Date with Tad Hamilton!	Teen Choice Award for Choice Movie – Lipock (shared with Kate Bosworth)	Nominated
2005	In Good Company P.S.	International Online Cinema Award for Best Breakthrough	Nominated
2005	—N/a	Premiere New Power Award for Actor	Won
2007	Spider-Man 3	Teen Choice Award for Choice Movie – Villain	Nominated
2007	Spider-Man 3	Teen Choice Award for Choice Movie – Rumble (shared with Tobey Maguire, James Franco & Thomas Haden Church)	Nominated
2008	Spider-Man 3	MTV Movie + TV Award for Best Villain	Nominated
2018	BlacKkKlansman	Cinema Vanguard Award	Won
2018	BlacKkKlansman	Artist of Distinction Award	Won
2019	BlacKkKlansman	Screen Actors Guild Award for Outstanding Performance by a Cast on a Motion Picture	Nominated

=== Television ===
Year	Title	Accolade	Results
1999	That '70s Show	Teen Choice Award for Choice TV – Breakout Performance	Nominated
1999	That '70s Show	Young Artist Award for Breakthrough Performance in a Television Series – Leading Young Actor	Nominated
1999	That '70s Show	Young Artist Award for Best Performance in a Television Series – Young Ensemble (shared with Laura Prepon, Mila Kunis, Wilmer Valderrama, Danny Masterson & Ashton Kutcher)	Nominated
2000	That '70s Show	Teen Choice Award for Choice TV Actor	Nominated
2001	That '70s Show	Teen Choice Award for Choice TV Actor	Nominated
2002	That '70s Show	Teen Choice Award for Choice TV Actor – Comedy	Nominated
2003	That '70s Show	Teen Choice Award for Choice TV Actor – Comedy	Nominated
2004	That '70s Show	Teen Choice Award for Choice TV Actor – Comedy	Nominated
2013	The Beauty Inside	Daytime Emmy Award for Outstanding New Approaches – Original Daytime Program or Series	Won
