= Teen Choice Award for Choice Movie: Rumble =

Entertainment award category

The following is a list of the Teen Choice Award winners and nominees for Choice Movie Rumble. The first ceremony took place in 2005.

== Winners and nominees ==
Winners are highlighted in bold text.

=== 2000s ===
Choice Movie: Rumble 2005
- **Brad Pitt vs. Angelina Jolie** – Mr. & Mrs. Smith
  - Elisha Cuthbert and Chad Michael Murray vs. Brian Van Holt – House of Wax
  - Will Ferrell vs. other newscasters – Anchorman: The Legend of Ron Burgundy
  - Jon Heder vs. Jon Gries – Napoleon Dynamite
  - Ashton Kutcher vs. Bernie Mac – Guess Who
  - Ewan McGregor vs. General Grievous – Star Wars: Episode III – Revenge of the Sith
  - Stone Cold Steve Austin vs. Bob Sapp – The Longest Yard
  - Z-boys vs. Diner owner – Lords of Dogtown
Choice Movie: Rumble 2007
- **Orlando Bloom vs. The Flying Dutchman Crew** – Pirates of the Caribbean: At World's End
  - Josh Duhamel vs. Blackout – Transformers
  - Chris Evans vs. Julian McMahon – Fantastic Four: Rise of the Silver Surfer
  - Tobey Maguire and James Franco vs. Topher Grace and Thomas Haden Church – Spider-Man 3
  - The Spartans vs. The Immortals – 300
Choice Movie: Rumble 2009
- **Robert Pattinson vs. Cam Gigandet** – Twilight
  - Anne Hathaway vs. Kate Hudson – Bride Wars
  - Hugh Jackman and Liev Schreiber vs. Ryan Reynolds – X-Men Origins: Wolverine
  - Beyoncé Knowles vs. Ali Larter – Obsessed
  - Chris Pine vs. Zachary Quinto – Star Trek

=== 2010s ===
Choice Movie: Fight 2010
- **Mia Wasikowska vs. The Jabberwocky – Alice in Wonderland**
  - Sean Combs vs. Russell Brand and Jonah Hill – Get Him to the Greek
  - Robert Downey Jr. and Don Cheadle vs. The Hammer Drones – Iron Man 2
  - Logan Lerman vs. Jake Abel – Percy Jackson & the Olympians: The Lightning Thief
  - Sam Worthington vs. Stephen Lang – Avatar
