= P.S. (film) =

2004 film by Dylan Kidd

- Theatrical poster
- Directed by: Dylan Kidd
- Written by: Dylan Kidd; Helen Schulman
- Based on: p.s. by Helen Schulman
- Produced by: Jeffrey Sharp
- Starring: Laura Linney; Topher Grace; Paul Rudd; Lois Smith; Gabriel Byrne; Marcia Gay Harden
- Cinematography: Joaquin Baca-Asay
- Edited by: Kate Sanford
- Music by: Craig Wedren
- Distributed by: Newmarket Films
- Release date: October 15, 2004
- Running time: 97 minutes
- Country: United States
- Language: English
- Box office: $273,023

P.S. is a 2004 American drama film directed by Dylan Kidd. The screenplay by Kidd and Helen Schulman is based on Schulman's 2001 novel p.s. The film stars Laura Linney and Topher Grace.

== Plot ==
Thirty-nine-year old divorcée Louise Harrington is Director of Admissions at Columbia University School of the Arts. Her only two friends are her ex-husband Peter, a Columbia professor, and her best friend she's known since high school.

Louise is unnerved when she receives an application from F. Scott Feinstadt, the same name of her high school sweetheart who was killed in a car crash, and calls the student to arrange an interview as he hadn't included the slides of his work. His voice is also familiar, so she visits her mom's upstate to find memorabilia of Scott.

When F. Scott finally shows up in her office on Monday, his appearance, mannerisms, and painting style closely resemble those of her former love. The similarities are so uncanny, Louise begins to suspect the young artist may be the reincarnation of her old flame. After she looks over F. Scott's slides, he hurries out of her office, fearing her rejection.

Louise follows F. Scott out, coaxing him into doing a private interview in her home. A short time later, their mutual attraction blooms into an affair. Also complicating Louise's life is her relationship with Peter, who over dinner that night confesses he is learning to cope with a sex addiction that, unknown to her, plagued their marriage.

Delving into the details, Peter admits he had sex with nearly 100 women and men. He claims that Louise's cluelessness about it practically goaded him to continue doing it, wanting to be caught.

Further complicating matters are Louise's ne'er-do-well brother Sammy, who is favored by their mother despite his shortcomings, and her best friend, Missy, who stole the original Scott from Louise before his death and seems intent on doing the same with the contemporary version.

== Principal cast ==
- Laura Linney as Louise
- Topher Grace as Francis Scott
- Paul Rudd as Sammy
- Lois Smith as Ellie
- Gabriel Byrne as Peter
- Marcia Gay Harden as Missy

== Production ==
On the DVD release of the film, director Dylan Kidd explains how cuts in the film changed the character of Louise. He opted to remove a scene depicting F. Scott living at home with his mother because he felt it bestowed upon him a lack of maturity he didn't want him to display. In that same scene, however, Louise confessed to being only an administrative assistant responsible for mailing catalogues and arranging campus tours rather than the director of admissions she had led the young man to believe she was. Deleting the scene necessitated making other cuts for the sake of continuity. On the DVD, Kidd also includes a deleted scene set in a cafe where Louise and F. Scott became better acquainted following their initial meeting and preceding their first sexual encounter in her apartment. Kidd had excised it due to time constraints but admits it made Louise look like less of a predator than she did without it.

The soundtrack includes the songs "These Flowers" and "When the Day Is Short," written and performed by Martha Wainwright.

== Release ==
The film premiered at the Venice Film Festival. It was shown at the Telluride Film Festival, Toronto International Film Festival, Austin Film Festival, and Edmonton International Film Festival before being given a limited theatrical release in the US, where it grossed $180,503.

== Critical reception ==
On review aggregation website Rotten Tomatoes, the film has an approval rating of 54% based on 81 reviews. The site’s critics consensus reads, "Laura Linney is as watchable as ever, but the melancholy P.S. never finds its footing." On Metacritic, the film has a score of 55 out of 100 based on 28 reviews, indicating "mixed or average reviews".

Manohla Dargis of The New York Times wrote the film shows a "contempt for its central character in specific and for women of a certain age in general" and that it lacks "the energy of Mr. Kidd's first feature." While Dargis noted Linney "easily negotiates the story's emotional and narrative switchbacks, sliding from fury to hurt like rain on a window, she can't fashion a living, breathing, believable human being from such a shabbily patched-together conceit."

Carla Meyer of the San Francisco Chronicle said, "Filmmaker Dylan Kidd assayed male-arrested development quite brilliantly in 2002's Roger Dodger, and at some moments, his follow-up film hints at a scabrous female reinterpretation. But Kidd and co-writer Helen Schulman...smooth every edge, and P.S. goes disappointingly soft despite two dynamite lead performances."

In a more positive review, Peter Travers of Rolling Stone awarded the film three out of a possible four stars. He commented Kidd "delivers a sexy, funny surprise package that resonates with long-buried emotions. Grace, away from the sitcom slick of That '70s Show, shows killer charm and rare sensitivity. But [it] ... is Linney's show, and she makes it hilarious and haunting."

Roger Ebert of The Chicago Sun-Times awarded the film three out of four stars and compared the film to Birth, also released in 2004. Ebert wrote, "Both films are fascinating because they require us to see the younger character through two sets of eyes – our own, which witness an attractive woman drawn to a younger male, and the women's, which see a lost love in a new container."

== Accolades ==
Laura Linney was nominated for the Satellite Award for Best Actress in a Motion Picture Drama, and she shared Best Actress honors with Emmanuelle Devos at the Mar del Plata Film Festival, where the film was nominated for Best Picture. Topher Grace won the National Board of Review of Motion Pictures Award for Best Breakthrough Performance by an Actor for this film and In Good Company. The film was also nominated for the Artios Award from the Casting Society of America for Best Casting in an Independent Feature Film.

== See also ==
- List of American films of 2004
