= Videogum =

Pop culture Blog

- Website type: Blog
- Dissolved: February 2014
- Owner: Buzz Media
- Creators: Scott Lapatine (Founder/Editor-In-Chief); Gabriel Delahaye (Senior Editor); Lindsay Robertson (Former Senior Editor); Amrit Singh (Executive Editor); Birdie (Mascot); Kelly Conaboy (Associate Editor); Mary Miller (Associate Editor)
- Website: Official website
- Commercial: Yes
- Launched: April 2008
- Current status: Not Active

Videogum was a daily Internet publication devoted to coverage of popular culture with a focus on movies and television. Stereogum founder Scott Lapatine founded Videogum as a sister site to Stereogum in 2008, and enlisted editors Gabe Delahaye and Lindsay Robertson, who quickly gained a cult following for their humorous commentary on pop culture and the Internet. Videogum spawned an online community known as the "Monsters" who perpetuated a variety of internet memes through the site's commentary system, chat, their communal blog, and via Twitter. The site garnered several nominations and accolades, including a win at the 2010 ECNY Awards for "Best Website".

== History ==
In 2009, Lindsay Robertson left the site, leaving Gabe Delahaye as its sole voice.

Videogum was mentioned in several prominent publications including The New York Times, and inspired segments on TV shows including Late Night with Jimmy Fallon.

In 2011, Kelly Conaboy was hired as junior editor. Delahaye frequently made fun of her dislike of the movie You Can Count on Me.

In 2012, Mary Miller was hired as a second associate editor.

Videogum was named one of the Best Blogs of 2011 by Time.

In 2013, Gabe Delahaye quit Videogum.

February 7, 2014 was the last day of normal operations for Videogum, at which time editor Scott Lapatine was "assessing options for keeping Videogum online in some form".

== Former recurring features ==
- Why Don't You Caption It: Feature in which the site's commenters were encouraged to create their own caption for an absurd or funny photo selected by the editor. The comment with the most upvotes got special placement in that week's Monsters' Ball.
- Teen Korner: A satirical commentary on teenage trends and interests written in slang.
- Monsters' Ball: The Week's Best Comments: This weekly feature compiled the 5 highest-rated comments (rated by the Monsters themselves), the lowest-rated comment, the Why Don't You Caption It winner, and an Editor's Choice comment.
- Taking One for the Team: Author and comedian Joe Mande participated in activities or attending events that would generally be mocked on Videogum. This feature saw Joe performing many tasks, such as reading Glenn Beck's The Overton Window and attending a live taping of The Marriage Ref.
- Best New Party Game: A semi-regular feature in which Gabe established a contest generally themed around cinematic wordplay or parodies of popular film quotes. The site's commenters voted for their favorites, and the winner was mentioned in the Monsters' Ball.
- Videogum Movie Club: On weeks which saw the major theatrical release of a movie relevant to the site's interests, Gabe posted a short review and open discussion of the film was encouraged in the comments section.
- Duh Aficionado Magazine: Not an official site feature but a very common recurring theme. The title was usually given to posts which featured news that served to reaffirm the generally held belief about the subject.
- Videogum Promise: Videogum promised to diligently follow a select listing of celebrities and post any interesting interviews or news relating to them. The promise was made regarding the following celebrities: Tracy Morgan, Louis C.K., Zach Galifianakis.
- Videogum Archives: Included, "The TWSS Archives" and "The Porno Switcheroo Archives." "The TWSS Archives" highlighted typical That's What She Said moments in which someone made an unintended sexual innuendo, while "The Porno Switcheroo Archives" highlighted instances where actual pornography was unintentionally shown in public.
- Top Chef Recaps: A weekly column where Gabe recaped that week’s episode of Top Chef.
- Mad Men Recaps: A weekly column recapping that week’s episode of Mad Men. This column was usually written by Benji Meyer, a 10-year-old who lived with his parents in Ohio. However, when Benji wasn't forced to watch Mad Men and was allowed to go to bed early, Gabe wrote the recap.
- The Petting Zoo: The Week's Top 10 Animal Videos: A weekly round-up of Kelly's favorite viral pet videos.
- Friendly Chat: Wednesday end-of-day chat conversation between Gabe and Kelly. They generally discussed a news point of the day. Kelly was usually fired by the end of the chat.
- How Was Everyone's Day Today: Thursday end-of-day feature that utilized the comments section as a forum for Monsters to talk about the latest events in their lives.
- You Can Make It Up: A weekly piece of celebrity fan fiction. Unlike most fan fiction, Delahaye's pieces parodied the celebrity, incorporating some current embarrassing action or statement from that celebrity. For example, after former model and talk show host Tyra Banks pretended to have rabies on an episode of her show, Delahaye wrote a piece called "Tyra Banks Has Rabies in the Forest," which cast her as a blood-thirsty animal.
- The Hunt for the Worst Movie of All Time: Videogum's longest running feature, in which Gabe attempted to watch as many reader-nominated films as he could in an attempt to find the worst. Often referred to simply as "The Hunt," the inspiration for this feature came from Gabe's feelings after watching the film Death Sentence starring Kevin Bacon. There were many rules governing what films may be nominated including availability on Netflix, whether or not it is "intended" to be horrible, and inclusion of "A- or B-list" actors, among others.
- Double Dog: The predecessor to "Taking One for the Team," these posts featured either Gabe or Lindsay completing challenges presented to them by the other. Some examples include Gabe attending a taping of Today and Lindsay taking a TV Bus Tour of New York City while alone and wearing a "Just Jack" T-shirt.
- Friday Fights: A feature during Lindsay's tenure in which she and Gabe engaged in a debate formatted as an IM conversation. This feature was briefly revisited with Gabe and RichFourFour debating the merits of Inception for the Videogum Movie Club.
- Lost Recaps: Gabe recapped episodes of the popular ABC show Lost until its final episode in May, 2010.
- The Event Recaps: Gabe recapped episodes of the ABC show The Event until Gabe realized The Event stinks and was not the new Lost.
- True Blood Recaps: A weekly column where Gabe reviews that week’s episode of True Blood which he lovingly refers to as "The Worst Show On Television".
- What's Up With Topher Grace?: Perhaps Videogum's most well-known feature where the site periodically checked in to see what is up with actor Topher Grace and his current career happenings. On September 22, 2010, Gabe stated that he was ending the feature, on the day of its one-year anniversary. Gabe explained his decision with "I think we’re done here. If even I am losing enthusiasm for this, then I believe I have made my point." He concluded the final column with "Best of luck to Topher Grace and all of the human beings trying to make it in this world."
- Glee Recaps: A weekly column where guest author Gabe Liedman (informally Soft Gabe) recapped the week’s episode of Glee.
- Movies For Dudes: A weekly feature in which Gabe Liedman took on the genre of Dude Flicks, where guns, pecs, car crashes, and glib one-liners delivered in front of a burning building with only half a T-shirt on and nothing left to lose reign supreme. Gabe Liedman loves those movies for so many reasons, all of which are that they turn him ON.

== Monsters ==
Videogum's commenter community was embraced by the administrators. Senior editor, Gabe Delahaye attributed this to his participation as a regular commenter on pop culture sites. Famous "monsters" or commenters have included:

- Ken Jennings
- Ted Leo
- Jake Fogelnest

Videogum was also associated with the "Goof Troop" Internet group.
