= Teen Choice Award for Choice TV Actor Comedy =

Entertainment award category

The following is a list of the Teen Choice Award winners and nominees for Choice TV Actor - Comedy.

== Winners and nominees ==
=== 2000s ===
Year	Winner	Nominees	Ref.
2002	Matt LeBlanc – Friends	Zach Braff – Scrubs; Topher Grace – That '70s Show; Seth Green – Greg the Bunny; Sean Hayes – Will & Grace; Ashton Kutcher – That '70s Show; Bernie Mac – The Bernie Mac Show; Frankie Muniz – Malcolm in the Middle	
2003	Ashton Kutcher – That '70s Show	Zach Braff – Scrubs; Topher Grace – That '70s Show; Matt LeBlanc – Friends; Bernie Mac – The Bernie Mac Show; Frankie Muniz – Malcolm in the Middle; Matthew Perry – Friends; John Ritter – 8 Simple Rules	
2004	Ashton Kutcher – That '70s Show	Anthony Anderson – All About the Andersons; Zach Braff – Scrubs; Topher Grace – That '70s Show; Matt LeBlanc – Friends; Bernie Mac – The Bernie Mac Show; Frankie Muniz – Malcolm in the Middle; Matthew Perry – Friends	
2005	Ashton Kutcher – That '70s Show	Zach Braff – Scrubs; Stewie Griffin – Family Guy; Marques Houston – Cuts; Matt LeBlanc – Joey; Bernie Mac – The Bernie Mac Show; Jesse Metcalfe – Desperate Housewives; Frankie Muniz – Malcolm in the Middle	
2006	Wilmer Valderrama – That '70s Show	Zach Braff – Scrubs; Steve Carell – The Office; Jason Lee – My Name Is Earl; Michael Rapaport – The War at Home; Tyler James Williams – Everybody Hates Chris	
2007	Steve Carell – The Office	Adrian Grenier – Entourage; Neil Patrick Harris – How I Met Your Mother; Charlie Sheen – Two and a Half Men; David Spade – Rules of Engagement	
2008	Steve Carell – The Office	Neil Patrick Harris – How I Met Your Mother; Charlie Sheen – Two and a Half Men; Michael Urie – Ugly Betty; Barry Watson – Samantha Who?	
2009	Jonas Brothers – Jonas	Steve Carell – The Office; Neil Patrick Harris – How I Met Your Mother; Charlie Sheen – Two and a Half Men; Jerry Trainor – iCarly	

=== 2010s ===
Year	Winner	Nominees	Ref.
2010	Jonas Brothers – Jonas	Steve Carell – The Office; Sterling Knight – Sonny with a Chance; Cory Monteith – Glee; Jim Parsons – The Big Bang Theory	
2011	Cory Monteith – Glee	Ty Burrell – Modern Family; Steve Carell – The Office; John Krasinski – The Office; Jim Parsons – The Big Bang Theory	
2012	Chris Colfer – Glee	Ty Burrell – Modern Family; Neil Patrick Harris – How I Met Your Mother; Ashton Kutcher – Two and a Half Men; Jim Parsons – The Big Bang Theory	
2013	Jim Parsons – The Big Bang Theory	Chris Colfer – Glee; Ashton Kutcher – Two and a Half Men; Jake Johnson – New Girl; Eric Stonestreet – Modern Family	
2014	Ross Lynch – Austin & Ally	Ashton Kutcher – Two and a Half Men; Chord Overstreet – Glee; Jim Parsons – The Big Bang Theory; Andy Samberg – Brooklyn Nine-Nine	
2015	Ross Lynch – Austin & Ally	Anthony Anderson – Black-ish; Jamie Camil – Jane the Virgin; Chris Colfer – Glee; Jim Parsons – The Big Bang Theory; Andy Samberg – Brooklyn Nine-Nine	
2016	Ross Lynch – Austin & Ally	Anthony Anderson – Black-ish; Jamie Camil – Jane the Virgin; Taylor Lautner – Cuckoo; Jim Parsons – The Big Bang Theory; Andy Samberg – Brooklyn Nine-Nine	
2017	Jean-Luc Bilodeau – Baby Daddy	Anthony Anderson – Black-ish; Jaime Camil – Jane the Virgin; Micah Fowler – Speechless; Andy Samberg – Brooklyn Nine-Nine; Hudson Yang – Fresh Off the Boat	
2018	Jaime Camil – Jane the Virgin	Anthony Anderson – Black-ish; Elias Harger – Fuller House; Rico Rodriguez – Modern Family; Andy Samberg – Brooklyn Nine-Nine; Hudson Yang – Fresh Off the Boat	
2019	Jaime Camil – Jane the Virgin	Anthony Anderson – Black-ish; Jim Parsons – The Big Bang Theory; Daniel Radcliffe – Miracle Workers; Marcel Ruiz – One Day at a Time; Andy Samberg – Brooklyn Nine-Nine	
