= In Good Company (2004 film) =

2004 film by Paul Weitz

- Theatrical release poster
- Directed by: Paul Weitz
- Written by: Paul Weitz
- Produced by: Paul Weitz; Chris Weitz
- Starring: Dennis Quaid; Scarlett Johansson; Topher Grace; Marg Helgenberger; Philip Baker Hall
- Cinematography: Remi Adefarasin
- Edited by: Myron I. Kerstein
- Music by: Damien Rice; Stephen Trask
- Production company: Depth of Field
- Distributed by: Universal Pictures (North America and French and Japanese home media); Focus Features (International)
- Release date: December 6, 2004 (United States)
- Running time: 110 minutes
- Country: United States
- Language: English
- Budget: $26 million
- Box office: $61.3 million

In Good Company is a 2004 American romantic comedy-drama film written and directed by Paul Weitz. The film stars Dennis Quaid, Topher Grace, and Scarlett Johansson. Quaid plays an advertising executive named Dan Foreman whose life is thrown into turmoil when he is demoted after his company is purchased by a large corporation. Forced to work under his replacement Carter Duryea amidst his wife's pregnancy, Foreman's life is further complicated by Duryea's lack of advertising experience and his burgeoning romantic relationship with Foreman's daughter.

In Good Company was released in the United States on December 6, 2004, by Universal Pictures domestically and Focus Features overseas. The film received positive reviews from critics, who praised the performances and corporate-based satirical humor, and grossed $61 million worldwide.

== Plot ==
Dan Foreman, a 51-year-old advertising executive, is head of sales for a national sports publication. When Sports America is bought out by Globecom, an international corporation promoting “synergy”, Dan, his wife and two daughters, 16-year-old Jana and 18-year-old Alex, experience unexpected life-changing events.

Dan is forced to fire several longtime colleagues and is demoted from head of sales to become the “wingman” of his new boss, Carter Duryea, a 26-year-old business school prodigy. Dan's ability to develop clients through handshake deals and relationships clashes with Carter's promotion of Globecom's synergy concept which sees Sports America cross-promoted with unlikely Globecom products including cell phones and “Krispity Krunch” snack food. Dan and Carter form an uneasy alliance. Dan finds out his wife is pregnant with a third child and is forced to take out a second mortgage to pay for Alex's studies at NYU. Carter is dumped by his adulterous, narcissistic wife and focuses his energy on work, realizing he needs Dan's practical, real-life experience to succeed.

Carter meets Alex during a dinner at Dan's and a mutual attraction ensues which leads to romance. Fearful of offending Dan they unsuccessfully attempt to keep their relationship a secret. Dan confronts them in a restaurant, punches Carter, and Alex is convinced to break up with him. Carter's boss, Mark Steckle, tells Carter to fire Dan. He refuses, feeling Dan essential to attracting a major advertiser. Steckle gives them 24 hours to solidify a contract or be fired. Carter yields to Dan's long-term relationship with the client, Eugene Kalib, and they conclude the deal.

Sports America is sold off in another corporate shake-up, Carter is let go, and Dan returns to his former position. Having developed fatherly feelings towards Carter, Dan offers him a position as his “second in command”. Carter declines, wanting to take time and to discover what he really wants in life. Afterwards, he encounters Alex and they renew their acquaintance.

When Dan's wife gives birth, he calls Carter. Carter, jogging outdoors for the first time, reports he feels like a new man.

== Cast ==
- Dennis Quaid as Dan Foreman
- Topher Grace as Carter Duryea
- Scarlett Johansson as Alex Foreman
- Marg Helgenberger as Ann Foreman
- David Paymer as Morty Wexler
- Clark Gregg as Mark Steckle
- Philip Baker Hall as Eugene Kalb
- Frankie Faison as Corwin
- Ty Burrell as Enrique Colon
- Kevin Chapman as Lou
- Amy Aquino as Alicia
- Zena Grey as Jana Foreman
- Selma Blair as Kimberly
- Lauren Tom as Obstetrician
- Colleen Camp as Receptionist
- John Cho as Petey
- Malcolm McDowell (uncredited) as Teddy K, Globecom CEO

== Reception ==
In Good Company received mostly positive reviews and has a rating of 83% on Rotten Tomatoes based on 169 reviews with an average score of 7.05/10. The consensus states "The witty and charming In Good Company offers laughs at the expense of corporate culture." The film also has a score of 66 out of 100 on Metacritic based on 40 reviews. Audiences polled by CinemaScore gave the film an average grade of "B+" on an A+ to F scale.

== TV series ==
On October 14, 2014 (on the film's 10th Anniversary), Universal Television hired Josh Bycel and Jon Fenner from Happy Endings to develop a TV show based on the film for CBS.
