= List of characters in The Loud House franchise =

The main characters of The Loud House, clockwise from left: Luan, Leni, Lori, Lincoln, Clyde, Luna, Lynn, Lucy, Lisa, Lola, Lily, and Lana.

The Loud House is an American sitcom multimedia franchise based on creator Chris Savino's own experiences with his large family. The franchise includes the television series The Loud House (2016–present), its spin-off series The Casagrandes (2019–2022), the films The Loud House Movie (2021), A Loud House Christmas (2021), A Really Haunted Loud House (2023), The Casagrandes Movie (2024), No Time to Spy (2024), and A Loud House Christmas Movie: Naughty or Nice (2025), and the live-action spin-off The Really Loud House (2022–2024). The Loud House, The Casagrandes, and ancillary media, including spin-offs, movies, and books, are set in the town of Royal Woods, Michigan, and the city of Great Lakes City. (Note: The Casagrandes episode "Throwing Pains" reveals that Great Lakes City is situated somewhere in the "Tri-Lakes Area".) The following is an abridged list of characters, consisting of the titular families and supporting characters from all the productions of the franchise.

== Cast table ==
Character	Voiced by	Television series															Films						Count
Character	Voiced by	The Loud House										The Casagrandes			The Really Loud House		The Loud House Movie	A Loud House Christmas	A Really Haunted Loud House	The Casagrandes Movie	No Time to Spy	A Loud House Christmas Movie: Naughty or Nice	Count
Character	Voiced by	1	2	3	4	5	6	7	8	9	10	1	2	3	1	2	The Loud House Movie	A Loud House Christmas	A Really Haunted Loud House	The Casagrandes Movie	No Time to Spy	A Loud House Christmas Movie: Naughty or Nice	Count
The Loud family
Lincoln Loud	Various (Note: Voiced by Sean Ryan Fox (2014), Grant Palmer (2016), Collin Dean (2016–2018), singing voice by Jackson Petty (2018), Tex Hammond (2018–2020), Asher Bishop (2020–2022), Bentley Griffin (2022–2024), Sawyer Cole (2023–2026), Nick A. Fisher (2025–present), portrayed by Wolfgang Schaeffer in A Loud House Christmas, The Really Loud House, and A Really Haunted Loud House.)	Main	Main	Main	Main	Main	Main	Main	Main	Main	Main	Guest	Guest	Guest	Main	Main	Main	Main	Main	(Note: Although no members of the main cast of The Loud House physically appear in The Casagrandes Movie, Lincoln, Lori, Luna, and Clyde (as well as Flip, who is not part of the main cast) can be seen commenting on Carlota's livestream.)	Main	Main	171
Lori L. Loud	Catherine Taber (Note: Portrayed by Lexi DiBenedetto in A Loud House Christmas, The Really Loud House, and A Really Haunted Loud House.)	Main	Main	Main	Main	Main	Main	Main	Main	Main	Main	Guest	Guest	Guest	Main	Main	Main	Main	Main		Main	Main	171
Leni L. Loud	Liliana Mumy (Note: Portrayed by Dora Dolphin in A Loud House Christmas and Eva Carlton in The Really Loud House and A Really Haunted Loud House.)	Main	Main	Main	Main	Main	Main	Main	Main	Main	Main	Guest	Guest		Main	Main	Main	Main	Main		Main	Main	166
Luna Loud	Nika Futterman (Note: Portrayed by Sophia Woodward in A Loud House Christmas, The Really Loud House, and A Really Haunted Loud House.)	Main	Main	Main	Main	Main	Main	Main	Main	Main	Main	Guest	Guest		Main	Main	Main	Main	Main		Main	Main	166
Luan Loud	Cristina Pucelli (Note: Portrayed by Catherine Ashmore Bradley in A Loud House Christmas, The Really Loud House, and A Really Haunted Loud House.)	Main	Main	Main	Main	Main	Main	Main	Main	Main	Main	Guest	Guest		Main	Main	Main	Main	Main		Main	Main	166
Lynn Loud Jr. (Note: Portrayed by Morgan McGill in A Loud House Christmas and Annaka Fourneret in The Really Loud House and A Really Haunted Loud House.)	Jessica DiCicco	Main	Main	Main	Main	Main	Main	Main	Main	Main	Main	Guest	Guest		Main	Main	Main	Main	Main		Main	Main	166
Lucy L. Loud (Note: Portrayed by Aubin Bradley in A Loud House Christmas, The Really Loud House, and A Really Haunted Loud House.)	Jessica DiCicco	Main	Main	Main	Main	Main	Main	Main	Main	Main	Main	Guest	Guest		Main	Main	Main	Main	Main		Main	Main	166
Lana Loud (Note: Portrayed by Mia Allan in A Loud House Christmas, The Really Loud House, and A Really Haunted Loud House.)	Grey DeLisle	Main	Main	Main	Main	Main	Main	Main	Main	Main	Main	Guest	Guest		Main	Main	Main	Main	Main		Main	Main	166
Lola Loud (Note: Portrayed by Ella Allan in A Loud House Christmas, The Really Loud House, and A Really Haunted Loud House.)	Grey DeLisle	Main	Main	Main	Main	Main	Main	Main	Main	Main	Main	Guest	Guest		Main	Main	Main	Main	Main		Main	Main	166
Lisa Loud	Lara Jill Miller (Note: Portrayed by Lexi Janicek in A Loud House Christmas, The Really Loud House, and A Really Haunted Loud House.)	Main	Main	Main	Main	Main	Main	Main	Main	Main	Main	Guest	Guest	Guest	Main	Main	Main	Main	Main		Main	Main	167
Lily Loud	Grey DeLisle (Note: Portrayed by Charlotte Anne Tucker and Lainey Jane Knowles in A Loud House Christmas and August Michael Peterson and Emily Ford in The Really Loud House and A Really Haunted Loud House.)	Main	Main	Main	Main	Main	Main	Main	Main	Main	Main	Guest	Guest		Main	Main	Main	Main	Main		Main	Main	166
Lynn Loud Sr.	Brian Stepanek	Main	Main	Main	Main	Main	Main	Main	Main	Main	Main	Guest	Guest		Main	Main	Main	Main	Main		Main	Main	166
Rita Loud	Jill Talley (Note: Portrayed by Muretta Moss in A Loud House Christmas and Jolie Jenkins in The Really Loud House and A Really Haunted Loud House.)	Main	Main	Main	Main	Main	Main	Main	Main	Main	Main	Guest	Guest		Main	Main	Main	Main	Main		Main	Main	166
The McBride family
Clyde McBride	Various (Note: Voiced by Caleel Harris (2016–2018), Andre Robinson (2018–2022), portrayed and voiced by Jahzir Bruno (2021–2024), Jaeden White (2022–2026), Juliano Krue Valdi (2025–present).)	Main	Main	Main	Main	Main	Main	Main	Main	Main	Main			Guest	Main	Main	Guest	Main	Main		Guest	Main	134
Howard McBride	Michael McDonald (Note: Portrayed by Justin Michael Stevenson in A Loud House Christmas and Stephen Guarino in The Really Loud House.)	Recurring	Recurring	Recurring	Recurring	Recurring	Recurring	Recurring	Guest	Guest					Guest	Guest	Guest	Main			Guest	Cameo	35
Harold McBride (Note: Portrayed by Marcus Folmar in A Loud House Christmas and Ray Ford in The Really Loud House.)	Wayne Brady (2016–2022) Khary Payton (2022–present)	Recurring	Recurring	Guest	Recurring	Recurring	Recurring	Recurring	Guest	Guest					Guest	Guest	Guest	Main			Guest	Cameo	35
The Casagrande/Santiago family
Ronalda "Ronnie" Anne Santiago	Breanna Yde (2016–2018) Izabella Alvarez (2019–present)	Recurring	Recurring	Recurring	Recurring		Recurring	Guest				Main	Main	Main			Guest			Main		Cameo	153
Roberto "Bobby" Santiago Jr.	Carlos PenaVega (Note: Portrayed by Matt Van Smith in A Loud House Christmas and Damian Alonso in The Really Loud House.)	Recurring	Recurring	Recurring	Recurring	Recurring	Recurring	Recurring	Cameo	Guest	Recurring	Main	Main	Main	Guest	Guest	Guest	Main	(Note: While Bobby Santiago is absent from A Really Haunted Loud House, a different character named Bobby portrayed by Cuan Snyman appears in the film.)	Main		Cameo	123
Maria Santiago	Sumalee Montano		Recurring	Recurring	Recurring		Guest	Guest				Main	Main	Main						Main		Cameo	153
Arturo Santiago	Eugenio Derbez (2019–2022) Fabio Tassone (2023–present)				Recurring		Guest					Main	Main	Main						Main			153
Rosa Casagrande	Sonia Manzano		Guest	Recurring	Recurring		Recurring	Recurring				Main	Main	Main						Main		Cameo	153
Hector Casagrande	Ruben Garfias		Guest	Recurring	Recurring		Guest	Guest		Guest		Main	Main	Main						Main		Cameo	153
Carlos Casagrande Sr.	Carlos Alazraqui		Guest	Recurring	Recurring		Recurring	Guest				Main	Main	Main						Main		Cameo	153
Sergio	Carlos Alazraqui		Guest	Recurring	Recurring		Recurring	Recurring				Main	Main	Main						Main		Cameo	153
Frida Puga-Casagrande	Roxana Ortega		Guest	Recurring	Recurring		Guest	Guest				Main	Main	Main						Main		Cameo	153
Carlota Casagrande	Alexa PenaVega		Guest	Recurring	Recurring		Recurring	Guest				Main	Main	Main						Main		Cameo	153
Carlos "CJ" Casagrande Jr.	Jared Kozak		Guest	Recurring	Recurring		Guest	Guest				Main	Main	Main						Main		Cameo	153
Carlino "Carl" Casagrande	Alex Cazares		Guest	Recurring	Recurring		Recurring	Recurring		Guest		Main	Main	Main						Main		Cameo	153
Carlitos Casagrande	Roxana Ortega (2016–2019) Cristina Milizia (2019–present)		Guest	Recurring	Recurring		Guest	Guest				Main	Main	Main						Main		Cameo	153
The Chang family
Sidney "Sid" Chang	Leah Mei Gold				Recurring			(Note: Despite having no physical appearances in Season 7, Sid is referenced in the episode "Let's Break a Deal", which has the holder of the 97th-highest score in Dance Battle: Mika's Game attributed to "SIDCH4N6".)				Main	Main	Main						Main			116
Adelaide Chang	Lexi Sexton				Guest							Recurring	Recurring	Recurring									116
Becca Chang	Melissa Joan Hart				Recurring							Recurring	Recurring	Recurring									116
Stanley Chang	Ken Jeong				Recurring							Recurring	Recurring	Recurring									116

== The Loud family ==
=== Lincoln Loud ===
Lincoln Albert Loud (voiced by Sean Ryan Fox in 2014, Grant Palmer in 2016, Collin Dean in 2016–2018, singing voice by Jackson Petty in "Really Loud Music", Tex Hammond in 2018–2020, Asher Bishop in 2020–2022, Bentley Griffin in 2022–2024, Sawyer Cole in 2023–2026, Nick A. Fisher in 2025–present), portrayed by Wolfgang Schaeffer in A Loud House Christmas, The Really Loud House, and A Really Haunted Loud House, Justin Allan as a young boy in The Really Loud House) is an 11-year-old boy (12-year-old season 6 onward and live-action media) with white hair who is the middle child and the only son in the Loud family. The character got his name from E Lincoln Avenue in Royal Oak, where the show's creator Chris Savino grew up. Lincoln has a passion for comic books, especially his favorite superhero Ace Savvy who has a playing card theme as well as secret agent David Steele. Alongside his little sister Lisa, Lincoln is the family nerd. He is also, however, the primary leader of his ten sisters, as he typically plans schemes, strategies, and "operations" for better convenience, as well as to help others, that the girls more often than not follow. Lincoln has other talents, including cooking, playing video games, performing magic tricks, and coaching his younger sister Lola to prepare her for her pageants. Lincoln wears an orange polo shirt, blue jeans, gray socks, and white sneakers. Lincoln often breaks the fourth wall by talking to the audience about living with all of his sisters, and considers himself the "Man with a Plan." He tries to give helpful advice concerning sibling relationships. For the first four seasons, Lincoln attends Royal Woods Elementary School with his younger sisters Lucy, Lana, Lola, and Lisa and is a 5th grader there. In "The Loudest Thanksgiving", it is revealed that Lincoln is vulnerable to tryptophan, which causes him to fall asleep before Thanksgiving dessert is served. In "Schooled!", Lincoln starts attending Royal Woods Middle School and transitions to 6th grade, attending school with his older sister Lynn.

=== Lori Loud ===
Lori L. Loud (voiced by Catherine Taber, portrayed by Lexi DiBenedetto in A Loud House Christmas, The Really Loud House, and A Really Haunted Loud House) is the 17-year-old (18-year-old from season 5 onward and live-action media) eldest child of the Loud family. She is named after one of Savino's five sisters. Lori was the roommate of her younger sister Leni even after she started attending and visiting Fairway University as of "Schooled!". In earlier episodes, Lori was often bossy, short-tempered, and condescending towards her younger siblings; however, she cares deeply about her family. Lori has a long-distance boyfriend named Bobby Santiago, the big brother of Lincoln's best friend Ronnie Anne Santiago; however, Lori enjoys seeing the two together, thinking that the two are a couple, much to their dismay. Lori wears a light blue tank top, brown cargo shorts, blue slip-on shoes, and white pearl earrings, she is tall, has big blonde hair (which is normal in the live-action projects), and stands out for being attractive. As she is the only Loud child with a driver's license, (Note: However, as of Lana's Listen Out Loud podcast and "Driver's Dread", it is revealed that Leni has obtained her driver's license.) Lori usually forces her siblings to do errands for her in exchange for being transported somewhere. Lori also occasionally has intense flatulence, which she denies, claiming that the sound was made by her shoes or another object like loose floorboards or a car seat. Lori is highly skilled at playing golf and is the first student in her school to join the golf varsity team as a freshman. For the first four seasons, she is a senior at Royal Woods High School and attends school with her younger sisters Leni, Luna and Luan. As of "Schooled!", she now attends Fairway University, still having to live in the house. However, she has expressed a fear of missing out on her family's lives in the episode "Lori Days". In "Homeward Bound", Lori takes a gap year from Fairway University and moves into Mr. Grouse's garage where her life there improves by "Apartment Complex". In "Trouble Brewing", Lori takes up a job at The Burnt Bean café. In "Cupid's Harrow", Lori and Bobby decide to spend some time apart. In "Bean Dreams", Lori follows her gut feeling where she leaves The Burnt Bean to become a playground monitor at Royal Woods Elementary School. In "Living the Dream Boat", Bobby and Lori get back together after learning about Bobby's disguised appearance and it also implied she has since quit school.

=== Leni Loud ===
Leni L. Loud (voiced by Liliana Mumy, portrayed by Dora Dolphin in A Loud House Christmas, Eva Carlton in The Really Loud House and A Really Haunted Loud House) is the 16-year-old (17-year-old from season 5 onward and live-action media) the second child of the Loud family. Leni is named after the character Lennie Small, a mentally-challenged but compassionate, curious, and physically strong companion of George Milton in John Steinbeck's novella Of Mice and Men. Leni and her older sister Lori are roommates. Lori attends and visits Fairway University as of "Schooled!". Leni wears a seafoam green dress, red hoop earrings, white sandals with seafoam green bows (these were replaced with white boots in the live-action media), and white sunglasses on her head. She often goes shopping at the Royal Woods Mall. She has a fear of spiders that is referenced in multiple episodes, most notably "Along Came a Sister". Along with Luna, Leni has the best older sister relationship with Lincoln. Leni occasionally fights with Lori over things such as clothes. Leni was hired to fold clothes at Reininger's Department Store in the Royal Woods Mall. She frequently tends to be absent-minded, which requires her siblings to correct her on things she misunderstands. She didn't have a driver's license or know how to drive Vanzilla in "Driving Miss Hazy", but Lana's Listen Out Loud podcast reveals that she is now able to drive, although she hasn't in any actual episodes due to a lack of confidence during the actual exam. Leni is a junior at Royal Woods High School for the first four seasons and attends school with her sisters Lori, Luna and Luan. As of "Schooled!", Leni becomes the oldest sibling in the house while Lori is away at Fairway University, is a senior, and attends school with Luna and Luan. As of "Driver's Dread", Leni eventually becomes successful in driving and got her driver's license. (Note: The episode "Bummer Camp" actually marks the first time Leni drives Vanzilla although it aired before "Driver's Dread", indicating that "Driver's Dread" took place before "Bummer Camp".) Throughout the series, Leni has had numerous crushes on boys, eventually settling on one named Gavin in "Food Courting"; in The Really Loud House, her boyfriend is a boy named Chase.

=== Luna Loud ===
Luna Loud (voiced by Nika Futterman, portrayed by Sophia Woodward in A Loud House Christmas, The Really Loud House, and A Really Haunted Loud House, Ava Torres as a young girl in The Really Loud House) is the 15-year-old (16-year-old from season 5 onward and live-action media) the third child of the Loud family and Luan's roommate. She is named after a pet dachshund Chris Savino's mother-in-law owned. She wears a purple shirt with a skull, a lavender skirt, a white belt, purple-tipped socks, high purple boots, black paperclip earrings, three bracelets, and a choker. Luna is a wild and upbeat musician who owns and plays various instruments; her signature instrument is a purple Dean ML electric guitar. Her passion for music has some negative effects, as in the episode "For Bros About to Rock" it is revealed that she unintentionally "ruined" her siblings' first concerts. Along with Leni, Luna has the best older sister relationship with Lincoln. The episodes "Study Muffin" and "L is for Love" revealed that Luna is bisexual, because she is attracted both to Lincoln's male tutor Hugh and a female classmate named Sam Sharp. (Note: Hugh only appears in one episode as a puppy love crush; Sam has appeared more regularly and is shown to be Luna's primary love interest.) Luna's siblings are aware that Sam is female, and are supportive of Luna's crush on her. As of the episode "Racing Hearts", Luna and Sam are officially dating. Both of them formed the band Moon Goats with their friends, who made up most of the music club. In the episode "Dad Reputation", Luna joins her father's band, The Doo-Dads, as its guitar player. Luna is a sophomore at Royal Woods High School for the first four seasons and attends school with her sisters Lori, Leni and Luan. However, as of "Schooled!", she is a junior and attends school with Leni and Luan.

According to an interview, she was Chris Savino's favorite character in the series. EW writer Nick Romano interview with Michael Rubiner, the showrunner of the series who he plans to continue the arc of Luna but he doesn't have any end point in mind for the two of them but "with 10 girls in the family", he felt natural "to explore one of them being LGBTQ." Kevin Sullivan, the writer of the series told Insider that he wasn't barred from using the word "lesbian" in dialogue when writing the storyline for Luna and her crush Sam and said that "we just can't say those words because of how young our audience can skew but the joy of the episode, that I was proud of was that it wasn't an coming out episode. The entire family accepted her, there was no having to come out."

=== Luan Loud ===
Luan L. Loud (voiced by Cristina Pucelli, portrayed by Catherine Ashmore Bradley in A Loud House Christmas The Really Loud House, and A Really Haunted Loud House, Parker Quinn Werdan as a young girl in The Really Loud House) is the 14-year-old (15-year-old from season 5 onward and live-action media) the fourth child of the Loud family, the roommate of Luna and is named after one of Savino's five sisters. She is depicted as the comedian of the house, with most of her dialogue consisting of bad puns that annoy her siblings. Luan wears braces, a white sleeveless shirt, a yellow skirt, yellow socks, brown shoes, and 3 pink flowers. Every April Fools' Day, Luan becomes a sadistic prank-obsessed maniac, which causes her family and Clyde to fear the holiday. While the pranks she pulls are mostly successful, the tables are occasionally turned against her as seen in the episodes "Fool's Paradise" and "Fool Me Twice". In the latter, Luan has stopped pulling pranks; however, in the episode "Silence of the Luans", Lily pulls pranks on their family, convincing Luan to resume pranking. Luan also has other talents, including performing as an expert birthday clown, juggler, magician, mime artist, and ventriloquist. Luan owns a dummy named Mr. Coconuts that she uses as part of her ventriloquy acts. Luan often becomes jealous of her siblings, as shown in the episode "Funny Business" in which Lincoln begins to overshadow Luan as a birthday clown. Luan is a freshman at Royal Woods High School for the first four seasons and attends school with her older sisters Lori, Leni and Luna. In "Schooled!", Luan is a sophomore attending school with her older sisters Leni and Luna. Her love interest is a fellow comedian named Benny, who she began dating in "Stage Plight".

=== Lynn Loud Jr. ===
Lynn L. Loud Jr. (voiced by Jessica DiCicco, portrayed by Morgan McGill in A Loud House Christmas, Annaka Fourneret in The Really Loud House and A Really Haunted Loud House, Aria Jade Tyler as a toddler in The Really Loud House, Nyomei Valentina Lara as a young girl in The Really Loud House) is the 13-year-old (14-year-old from season 5 onward and live-action media) athletic fifth child of the Loud family and Lucy's roommate. She is named after one of Savino's five sisters (Lynn). (Note: In the series, Lynn Loud Jr. is named after her father.) Lynn tends to start competitions among her siblings and plays a large number of different sports. She is highly superstitious because she does not want to lose her winning streak. Lynn wears a red and white jersey, track shorts, white high-knee socks, and black cleats. Unlike Lori, Lynn is not insecure when she passes gas. She does not hesitate to burp out loud or to do things such as a Dutch oven on Lincoln. Lynn is also an expert at ninjutsu and can even run on all fours while carrying someone on her back. In the episode "Middle Men", it is revealed that Lynn developed a brash personality when she started middle school because she was bullied throughout her first year. Lynn attends Royal Woods Middle School as a 7th grader for the first four seasons, with Lincoln joining her as of "Schooled"; Lynn, who also assumes the role of hallway monitor, attends the 8th grade as of the episode.

=== Lucy Loud ===
Lucy L. Loud (voiced by Jessica DiCicco, portrayed by Aubin Bradley in A Loud House Christmas, The Really Loud House, and A Really Haunted Loud House) is the 8-year-old (9-year-old from season 5 onward and live-action media) seventh child and sixth daughter of the Loud family and Lynn's roommate. Her name came from Savino and his wife's plans to name potential daughters. Lucy wears a black dress, long white sleeves and stockings with black stripes, and black shoes. She has pale white skin and long black hair with bangs that cover her eyes. She looks identical to the Loud children's great-grandmother Harriet. Lucy often seems to appear out of nowhere, which often frightens her siblings. She is also a fortune-teller, and her predictions turn out to happen very literally. Along with Lana and Lily, she has the best younger sister relationship with Lincoln. At school, Lucy is a part of the Morticians' Club with similar students. Lucy has a bust of the vampire Edwin, who is from her favorite book and TV series The Vampires of Melancholia. While she pledges to be with Edwin in the afterlife, her crush is Rusty Spokes' younger brother Rocky. Lucy is a 3rd grader at Royal Woods Elementary School for the first four seasons and attends school with her siblings Lincoln, Lana, Lola, and Lisa. As of "Schooled!", Lucy is a 4th grader and attends school with her younger sisters Lana, Lola, and Lisa.

=== Lana Loud ===
Lana L. Loud (voiced by Grey DeLisle, portrayed by Mia Allan in A Loud House Christmas, The Really Loud House, and A Really Haunted Loud House) is the 6-year-old (7-year-old from season 5 onward and live-action media) eighth child and seventh daughter of the Loud family, and is named after one of Savino's five sisters. The episode "Ties That Bind" reveals that Lana is the identical twin sister of her roommate Lola and was born two minutes before her, making Lana the older twin. Lana usually wears a red baseball cap backward or sideways, a murky green t-shirt, dark blue overalls, and white sneakers. She is a tomboy who loves to get her hands dirty. Lana is a skilled handy worker, plumber, and mechanic who loves animals, especially frogs and reptiles. She will always defend animals from any possible harm. Along with Lucy and Lily, Lana has the best younger sister relationship with Lincoln. She also has a close bond with her sister Lola, who she hangs out and works together with. Throughout the series, she acts like a dog, especially when she eats trash or dog food. In Leni's Listen Out Loud podcast, Leni and Lincoln state that the family buys Lana food and toys at the pet shop. Lana is in 1st grade at Royal Woods Elementary School for the first four seasons and attends school with Lincoln, Lucy, Lola, and Lisa. In "Schooled!", Lana attends 2nd grade with her sisters Lucy, Lola, and Lisa.

=== Lola Loud ===
Lola Loud (voiced by Grey DeLisle, portrayed by Ella Allan in A Loud House Christmas, The Really Loud House, and A Really Haunted Loud House) is the 6-year-old (7-year-old from season 5 onward and live-action media) ninth child and eighth daughter of the Loud family and the identical twin sister of her roommate Lana. The episode "Ties That Bind" reveals that Lola was born two minutes after Lana, making her the younger twin. She is named after a pet Dachshund of Savino's. Lola is depicted as a princess who plots and schemes to get her way and becomes maniacal if her siblings or anyone else angers her in any way. She is usually seen wearing a long pink gown, sash, a white pearl necklace and earrings, long pink gloves, pink high heels, and a tiara. Lola constantly enters child beauty pageants. When her siblings confess to each other things they did, Lola often rats on them, especially Lincoln. Underneath her mean-spirited exterior, Lola is shown to be forgiving and affectionate and admits to herself that she is a "crazy pants" sometimes. There is a running gag that comedically exaggerates Lola's strength when she is angered, as when she single-handedly subdues her oldest sister Lori. Both she and Lana use a pink jeep as their mode of transportation around Royal Woods. Lola is in 1st grade at Royal Woods Elementary School for the first four seasons and attends school with Lincoln, Lucy, Lana, and Lisa. In "Schooled!", Lola attends 2nd grade with her sisters Lucy, Lana, and Lisa. Rita's episode of Listen Out Loud and the episode "Candy Crushed" reveals that Lola has a strong sweet tooth. She loves dogs and cats.

=== Lisa Loud ===
Lisa Loud (voiced by Lara Jill Miller, portrayed by Lexi Janicek in A Loud House Christmas, The Really Loud House, and A Really Haunted Loud House) is the 4-year-old (5-year-old from season 5 onward and live-action media) tenth child and ninth daughter of the Loud family, and is named after one of Savino's five sisters. Lisa is a gifted child prodigy who has a PhD and is a Junior Nobel Prize recipient but is currently in kindergarten by her own choice. Lisa enjoys solving complex equations, math problems, and performing elaborate experiments in which she often uses her unaware siblings and Clyde as test subjects. She wears glasses, an olive green turtleneck sweater, dark pink pants, and brown loafers. Her brown hair was revealed to be a wig in "Potty Mouth", having burnt it due to a botched nuclear experiment. (Note: Except in live-action media.) Lisa often uses formal and detailed terms to refer to basic things before saying them in layman's terms. She often tends to be quite reckless and unethical with her experiments but is ultimately a good-hearted girl. A running gag is that Lisa's beakers filled with compound mixtures tend to explode, which occasionally mutate her body; as such, she has to wear dentures and a wig and has an extra toe. She is also a fan of west coast rap music and is very good at breakdancing. Despite her intellect, Lisa struggles greatly with simple things such as arts and crafts because of her stubby fingers and also struggles to form friendships with her peers. Some of Lisa's inventions include an assortment of robots, projects that she collaborated with Lincoln on, Gloweos (cookies infused with the bioluminescent DNA of the Aequorea victoria that make the consumer glow in the dark for a short time), a Urine Detector liquid that removes urine from bodies of water, Gravity Shoes that enable her to walk on the ceiling, a chocolate fountain that started out as a nuclear fusion device until she dropped her chocolate bar in it, a compatibility machine used to match up two people, robotic kangaroo legs to go with Lisa and Lily's shared kangaroo costume, overly-effective lie-detecting products, a chemical analysis machine, and a reanimator. In addition, she has done different fecal research and also figured out time traveling which she used in two episodes. Lisa attends Royal Woods Elementary School as a kindergartner for the first four seasons with her older siblings Lincoln, Lucy, Lana, and Lola. In "Schooled!", Lisa begins first grade, joining sisters Lucy, Lana, and Lola at Royal Woods Elementary School. In "Europe Road Trip: A Bite in Transylvania", it is revealed that Lisa has a fear of blood.

=== Lily Loud ===
Lily L. Loud (voiced by Grey DeLisle, portrayed by Charlotte Anne Tucker and Lainey Jane Knowles in A Loud House Christmas, August Michael Peterson and Emily Ford in The Really Loud House and A Really Haunted Loud House) is the 1-year-old baby (2-year-old toddler season 5 onward and live-action media) of the Loud family as well as the youngest child and Lisa's roommate. She is generally happy-go-lucky, but she is also intelligent and has a mischievous streak. Her name came from Savino and his wife's plans for having daughters. In the first four seasons, Lily is usually seen wearing only a diaper. From the fifth season on, Lily is seen wearing a white shirt, lavender shorts, and white booties. Lily is babysat by Lincoln on several occasions, with whom she has the best younger sister relationship along with Lucy and Lana. She has a habit of losing her diaper, which her older siblings put back on. Her siblings and her parents always change Lily's diaper in her and Lisa's room. Prior to season five, the only phrase aside from gibberish Lily says is "poo-poo", usually as her diaper flies across the screen or she needs a diaper change. Lily shares a room with her older sister Lisa and her gibberish can sometimes be translated by her older siblings. Around the end of "Washed Up", Lily is the only one who sees Lake Eddy's residential cryptid Plessy which Lincoln and Lucy wanted to find. In "Any Given Sundae", Lily tries her first ice cream and enjoys it. As of "Schooled!", Lily is able to speak more words and is now potty-trained. She also refers to herself in the third person, starts wearing clothes, and is reluctant to start preschool at Baby Bunker Preschool until she heard about Leni's experience at the preschool.

=== Lynn Loud Sr. ===
Lynn L. Loud Sr. (voiced and portrayed by Brian Stepanek in all media) is the father of the Loud children. His complete face is unseen until the second-season episode "11 Louds a Leapin'". Lynn Sr. often breaks up fights between his children before they grow too violent, quotes "ding dang" during his moments of frustration, and often has his emotional moments. He is completely clueless about the use of modern technologies to the point of not knowing how to text and is an expert at playing the cowbell. Lynn Sr. wears a sea-green sweater, brown slacks, and shoes. Lynn Sr. used to work in IT before pursuing a culinary career as he does all the cooking for his family like making his own lasagnas called "Lynn-sagna". His dream is finally realized in the episode "Cooked!" when he opens up his own restaurant called Lynn's Table. In "Recipe for Disaster", it is revealed that Lynn Sr. learned some of the ingredients for his dishes from his home economics teacher, who now owns the Frosty Farms Frozen Foods company. In "Dad Reputation", Lynn Sr. starts a band called the Doo-Dads, which consist of five members: himself, Harold, Kotaro, Rodney, and Luna. In "Present Danger", it is revealed that Lynn Sr. is a fan of David Steele. In "Home of the Fave", it is revealed that Lynn Sr. has a brother named Lance who made his first appearance in "'Twas the Fight Before Christmas". The latter episode revealed that Lynn Sr. was on bad terms with his brother ever since he accidentally broke his exercise ball. Lincoln tried to mend the relationship between his father and Lance, only for further attempts to backfire after Lynn Sr. mistook Lance's attempt to kill a spider as deliberately breaking his new spatula. After Lincoln, Lori, and Lance's daughter Shelby got stuck on a sheet of cracking ice on Lake Mastodon, the two brothers decided to put aside their rivalry to help their children.

=== Rita Loud ===
Rita Loud (voiced by Jill Talley, portrayed by Muretta Moss in A Loud House Christmas, Jolie Jenkins in The Really Loud House and A Really Haunted Loud House) is the mother of the Loud children. Her complete face is unseen until the second-season episode "11 Louds a Leapin'". Rita deeply cares about her children, but she is not afraid to punish them if their fighting grows too extreme. Rita wears a dark pink buttoned shirt, purple pants, white earrings, and black flats. It is revealed in the episodes "Cover Girls" and "L is for Love" that she met Lynn Sr. when she was working as a crossing guard. Rita's family includes her father Albert, from whom she learned how to drive a plane and a tank. She also has one aunt named Ruth. Rita works as a dental assistant under the dentist Dr. Feinstein, (Note: Dr. Feinstein is voiced by Charlie Schlatter.) though she is working to become an author. In "Write and Wrong", Rita is hired at the Royal Woods Gazette as an advice columnist. The Really Loud House episode "What's a Mother to Redo" reveals that Rita is allergic to strawberries. The live-action series episode "Get Out of Dodgeball" also reveals that her last name before her marriage was Reynolds.

=== Other Loud family members ===
==== Leonard Loud ====
Leonard Loud (voiced by Rick Zieff) is Lynn Sr. and Lance's father, Rita and Sharon Loud's father-in-law, and the children's paternal grandfather who was mentioned by Lynn Sr. in "Vantastic Voyage". He is often called "Gramps" by his grandchildren. Like his son, Leonardo tends to cry a lot. While originally designed to look like a hippie in a flashback seen in "Vantastic Voyage", he was later redesigned in his official debut in "Camped!" where he resembled Lynn Sr. with a longer beard. Leonard was originally a traveling fisherman as seen in "Camped!" until he got word from his son when Camp Mastodon was closing. When the treasure was found and he used his boat to save his family, Leonard offered to use the treasure to keep Camp Mastodon open as its new proprietor so that he can be closer to his family. In "Present Danger", it is revealed that Leonard is a fan of David Steele. In "Bummer Camp", Leonard learns how to be a camper from his grandchildren. The episode "Be Careful What You Fish For" revealed that Gramps lost the big toe on his right foot 30 years ago during an attack by the great white sturgeon Moby Rick who also wrecked the ship that he was on. Lynn commented that the loss of his big toe is why he wears socks and sandals.

==== Lance Loud ====
Lance Loud (voiced by Rob Riggle) is Lynn Sr.'s athletic brother, Rita Loud's brother-in-law, and the children's paternal uncle who lives out in Petoskey Falls, Michigan where he is the proprietor of the Endur-Lance Gym. However, there are things he can't do because of his muscle mass like ziplining and swimming. He is first mentioned in "Home of the Fave" and made his first physical appearance in "'Twas the Fight Before Christmas". Compared to his brother Lynn, Lance has a rather muscly build. He has a wife named Sharon and raises three children: eldest son Shane, middle daughter Shelby, and youngest son Shiloh. In "Home of the Fave", Lance was mentioned to be the favorite son of Leonard and during a family Christmas gathering, an accident would drive them apart. During "'Twas the Fight Before Christmas", Lincoln along with his sisters would devise a plan to reunite his father with his brother at Camp Mastodon. Eventually, Lynn Sr. and Lance reconciled after working together to save Lincoln, Lori, and Shelby who were stranded on a swiftly-cracking sheet of ice at Lake Mastodon. In "One False Move", Uncle Lance moves his family to Royal Woods to be closer to the Endur-Lance Gym as they move in to the house on the same street as their relatives. In "Grouse of Horrors", Lance is shown to have a fear of ghosts and can make "Lance-sagna" (his take on his brother's Lynn-sagna with more protein powder").

==== Sharon Loud ====
Sharon Loud (voiced by Ozioma Akagha) is an African-American woman who is Lance's wife, Lynn Sr. and Rita Loud's sister-in-law, and the children's paternal aunt. She is an expert at yoga and meditation. Sharon makes her first appearance in "'Twas the Fight Before Christmas" where she was shown to be close with Rita. When her husband Lance got enraged when he saw his brother Lynn, Sharon taught him a method to stay calm which he eventually took into heart later in the episode.

==== Shane Loud ====
Shane Loud (voiced by Christopher Livingston) is the oldest son of Lance and Sharon and the children's paternal cousin. He makes his first appearance in "'Twas the Fight Before Christmas". Like Luna, he is into singing and is able to do a cappella.

==== Shelby Loud ====
Shelby Loud (voiced by Kyrie McAlpin) is the bespectacled middle child of Lance and Sharon and the children's paternal cousin. She makes her first appearance in "'Twas the Fight Before Christmas". Like Lincoln, she is the only daughter in the family and can be silly at times. When brainstorming, Shelby tends to twirl around the room. She is shown to have a bad sense of direction.

==== Shiloh Loud ====
Shiloh Loud (voiced by Bahia Watson) is a 6-year-old child who is the youngest child of Lance and Sharon and the children's paternal cousin. He makes his first appearance in "'Twas the Fight Before Christmas". Shiloh is known to do cannonballs into any physical object and can lift objects much larger and heavier than he is.

==== Albert Reynolds ====
Albert Reynolds (voiced by Fred Willard in 2016–2019, Christopher Swindle in "Resident Upheaval", Piotr Michael in 2021–present, portrayed by Bill Southworth in A Loud House Christmas) is the children's maternal grandfather, Lynn Loud Sr.'s father-in-law, Rita's father, and Ruth's brother. He is often called "Pop-Pop" by his grandchildren. It is revealed in the series that he was a former member of the United States military until his retirement. Albert wears a white button-up shirt, blue jean overalls with orange suspenders, a black belt, and white sneakers. He has a good relationship with his daughter and is very close to Lincoln, with whom he shares the same hair color and hairstyle. While it was revealed in "Cover Girls" that Albert is near-sighted, this is never brought up again in later episodes. Starting in "The Old and the Restless", Albert moved into Sunset Canyon Retirement Home where his old friends live. In "Pop Pop the Question", he proposes to Myrtle, and they are officially married in No Time to Spy: A Loud House Movie.

==== Myrtle ====
Myrtle (voiced by Jennifer Coolidge in 2018–2022, Alex Cazares from 2024 onwards) is the girlfriend of Albert. Because she traveled extensively in her youth prior to meeting Albert, Myrtle never married or had children of her own. When she became Albert's girlfriend, she started to treat the Loud children as her own grandchildren. Upon accepting her, the children started to call her "Gran-Gran" as she had wanted them to call her. The episode "Resident Upheaval" reveals that Myrtle does not live at Sunset Canyon Retirement Home and only visits Albert there. By the end of the episode, Myrtle moves into Sunset Canyon Retirement Home with Gayle as a roommate. In "Pop Pop the Question", Myrtle proposes to Albert while officially becoming the Loud children's official step-grandmother. It is also revealed that when she was younger, she was a secret agent who was in fake marriages with her partners as part of her cover on different missions. Her skills do help Lincoln perfect his spy tumbling. The film No Time to Spy shows her marriage to Albert and revealed that her spy code-name is Agent 28.

==== Ruth ====
Ruth (voiced by Grey DeLisle) is Albert's sister, Lynn Loud Sr.'s aunt-in-law, Rita's paternal aunt, and the Loud children's maternal great-aunt. She is depicted as a cat lady with a distasteful attitude because she makes the children eat old pudding and watch her cats when the Loud family visits. She wears an olive green dress with flowers on it and white shoes. Ruth is also shown to have a sixth toe on her left foot which creeps out even Lynn Sr. Only Rita, Lana, and later Lily are the ones who can tolerate visiting her.

==== 1600s' ancestors ====
The ancestors of the Loud family from the 1600s, shown in The Loud House Movie, were driven away from their town of Loch Loud by Aggie using a magic stone on Lolo the Dragon. While Lucille first appears as a ghost in the film, the rest of them appear in ghost form at the end of the film to praise Angus for taking on the responsibility as the new Duke of Loch Loud.

- The Duke of Loch Loud (voiced by Asher Bishop) is the unnamed ancestor of the Louds, who looked like Lincoln, and was known for his noble deeds around Loch Loud. Following Morag's defeat, the ghost of the Duke and his family deem Angus a worthy successor of Lincoln as the new Duke of Loch Loud.
- Lucille Loud (voiced by Katy Townsend) is an ancestor (Note: Lucille addresses Lucy as "cousin" throughout The Loud House Movie, though it is not clear if she is truly a distant cousin of the family or more precisely a distant great-aunt due to this error.) of the Louds, looking like Lucy, and being one of the sisters of the Duke of Loch Loud. She serves as a witness chronicling the Loud family's past after being summoned into the present by Lucy in ghost form. She is also the only distant ancestor of the family whose name has been revealed.

The rest of the ancestors who appear have not been named. They include:

- A Lori look-alike 1600s' ancestor who wears a sleeveless dress, and one of the sisters of the Duke of Loch Loud.
- A Leni look-alike 1600s' ancestor (voiced by Liliana Mumy) who sports braids and wore a blue tartan dress, and one of the sisters of the Duke of Loch Loud. She was known for her fashion skills in Loch Loud.
- A Luna look-alike 1600s' ancestor who wears a purple cloak and a blue tartan dress, and one of the sisters of the Duke of Loch Loud. She was known for her musical skills in Loch Loud.
- A Luan look-alike 1600s' ancestor who sports a braided hair and wears a jester hat and a blue tartan dress, and one of the sisters of the Duke of Loch Loud. She was known for her wisecrackery in Loch Loud.
- A Lynn Jr. look-alike 1600s' ancestor who sports a blue tartan skirt, and one of the sisters of the Duke of Loch Loud. She was known for her athletic abilities in Loch Loud.
- A Lana look-alike 1600s' ancestor who sports an orange hat and a dark grey skirt whose hair is in two braids, and one of the sisters of the Duke of Loch Loud.
- A Lola look-alike 1600s' ancestor who sports a large gold crown and a tan Victorian dress, and one of the sisters of the Duke of Loch Loud.
- A Lisa look-alike 1600s' ancestor (voiced by Lara Jill Miller) who wears a black Victorian dress, and one of the sisters of the Duke of Loch Loud. She has the same intelligence as Lisa and has her own laboratory at Loud Castle as seen when her ghost noted that she missed her laboratory.
- A Lily look-alike 1600s' ancestor who wears a lacy blue tartan dress, and one of the sisters of the Duke of Loch Loud.
- A Rita look-alike 1600s' ancestor (voiced by Jill Talley) who wears a pink and white ballgown, and the mother of the Duke of Loch Loud and his sisters.
- A Lynn Sr. look-alike 1600s' ancestor (voiced by Brian Stepanek) who has a full head of hair and wears a brown jacket and a kilt, and the father of the Duke of Loch Loud and his sisters. Like his descendant, he can quote "ding dang" during his frustrations.

=== Loud family pets ===
The Loud family has different pets in their house who usually show the same emotions as the children on different occasions.

The main family pets include:

- Charles (vocal effects provided by Dee Bradley Baker) is a black and white Miniature Bull Terrier who has freckles and black concentric circles on his back and left eye. Charles is usually seen sleeping in Lincoln's room.
- Cliff (vocal effects provided by Dee Bradley Baker) is a black-furred domestic short-haired cat with a large black nose and small ears.
- Geo (vocal effects provided by Audrey Wasilewski) is a hamster who travels in a hamster ball.
- Walt (vocal effects provided by Dee Bradley Baker) is a yellow canary who often has an angry expression on his face and is strong enough to lift Lily. (Note: As seen in "Schooled!")

The Loud siblings also have their own pets:

- Hops is Lana's pet frog and "best friend" since they first met while she was swimming in a pond in the episode "Frog Wild". He helps her out in times of need.
- Bitey is Lana's pet rat.
- Izzy is Lana's pet gecko.
- El Diablo is Lana's pet Burmese python.
- Duncan is Lana's pet Virginia opossum.
- Gary is Luan's pet rabbit.
- Fangs is Lucy's pet vampire bat. Fangs often joins Lucy in some of her activities.

=== Lisa's robots ===
Lisa Loud has made an assortment of robots in order of appearance:

- Mr. Reinforced Titanium Alloy Arms (voiced by Jeff Bennett) is a robot that was created by Lisa who sports a mailbox-like torso and tank treads for feet.
- Todd (voiced by Brian Stepanek in all media) is a robot that was created by Lisa from different devices. He has a bucket for a head, a calculator on his forehead, a corkscrew neck, a printer for a chest (it was substituted with a Nintendo Entertainment System in The Really Loud House), building toy arms where a magnet serves as a left hand and a pair of scissors serve as a right hand, a sound amplifier lower body, a fire extinguisher on his back, and different bicycle wheels instead of feet. Todd would sometimes assist Lisa in her projects and is also programmed to understand every known human language enough to translate them.

== The McBride family ==
=== Clyde McBride ===
Clyde McBride (voiced by Caleel Harris in 2016–2018, Andre Robinson in 2018–2022, portrayed and voiced by Jahzir Bruno in 2021–2024, A Loud House Christmas, The Really Loud House, and A Really Haunted Loud House, Levi Mynatt as a 9-year-old in The Really Loud House, voiced by Jaeden White in 2022–2026, Juliano Krue Valdi in 2025–present) is an 11-year-old boy (12-year-old season 5 onward) who is best friends with Lincoln. He owns a walkie-talkie that he uses on "missions" with Lincoln and is usually up-to-date on code words used when conveying messages. Clyde and Lincoln share many interests, such as video games and science fiction movies. He used to have an unrequited crush on Lori and tended to have nosebleeds, faint whenever he saw her, and/or he acts like a malfunctioned robot. He wears circular glasses, a yellow and blue striped sweater, black pants, and black tennis shoes. When Lincoln cosplays as Ace Savvy, Clyde dresses as Ace's sidekick One-Eyed Jack. Clyde is a 5th grader at Royal Woods Elementary School until "Schooled!" when he begins attending Royal Woods Middle School as a 6th-grader. He is also an accomplished pastry chef and baker.

=== Howard McBride ===
Howard McBride (voiced by Michael McDonald, portrayed by Justin Michael Stevenson in A Loud House Christmas, Stephen Guarino in The Really Loud House) is Clyde's overprotective red-haired white father, who cares deeply about his son's well-being. While showering Clyde with attention, Howard rarely lets him do anything unsupervised as he becomes overemotional while watching his son grow up. Both Harold and Howard wear brown slacks, a pair of jeans, white sneakers, brown loafer shoes, a red collared shirt, a blue/teal sweater vest, a black bow tie, and a light blue shirt. The McBrides, who are an interracial couple, are the first married gay couple to be featured in a Nickelodeon animated series.

=== Harold McBride ===
Harold McBride (voiced by Wayne Brady in 2016–2022, Khary Payton in 2022–present, portrayed by Marcus Folmar in A Loud House Christmas, Ray Ford in The Really Loud House) is Clyde's overprotective African-American father, and the son of Gayle, who cares deeply about their son's well-being. While showering Clyde with attention along with Howard, they rarely let him do anything unsupervised. Both Howard and Harold wear brown slacks, a pair of jeans, white sneakers, brown loafer shoes, a red collared shirt, a blue/teal sweater vest, a black bow tie, and a light blue shirt. The McBrides, who are an interracial couple, are the first married gay couple to be featured in a Nickelodeon animated series. In the episode "Dad Reputation", Harold joins Lynn Loud Sr.'s group The Doo-Dads, and plays the accordion.

=== Gayle McBride ===
Gayle McBride (voiced by Loretta Devine, portrayed by Gail Everett-Smith in A Loud House Christmas) is the mother of Harold, the mother-in-law of Howard and the adoptive grandmother of Clyde. She was mentioned a lot in the series before showing up in person in the episode "Resident Upheaval" where she was up against Myrtle for an available room in Sunset Canyon Retirement Home, sparking a competition between Lincoln and Clyde to see whose grandmother will move in. By the end of the episode, Gayle gets a double room while gaining Myrtle as her roommate.

=== McBride family pets ===
- Cleopawtra (vocal effects provided by Dee Bradley Baker) is the McBride family's orange cat. Her name is a pun on "Cleopatra."
- Nepurrtiti (vocal effects provided by Dee Bradley Baker) is a lavender kitten that was obtained by the McBrides in "Baby Steps". Her name is a pun on "Nefertiti."

== The Casagrande family ==
The Casagrandes are a Mexican American family of characters who are the extended family of the Santiagos. While the Casagrandes appear in multiple episodes of The Loud House, they later gained their own spin-off show. It is revealed in both shows that the Casagrandes live in fictional Great Lakes City which is three hours away from Royal Woods and in a neighboring state. They hate cats due to having encountered swarms of cats in the city.

=== Ronnie Anne Santiago ===
Ronalda "Ronnie" Anne Santiago (voiced by Breanna Yde in 2016–2018 of The Loud House, Izabella Alvarez in 2019–present of The Loud House and The Casagrandes) is the 11-year-old (12 as of The Casagrandes Movie) sister of Bobby, a tough tomboy who enjoys skateboarding, playing video games, and pranks. She wears a purple zipper hoodie, jean shorts, a white tank top underneath her hoodie (in "City Slickers" and "No Show! with the Casagrandes"), pink knee-high socks, and purple shoes. Originally depicted as a classmate who would annoy Lincoln with embarrassing pranks, Ronnie Anne eventually becomes one of Lincoln's best friends. A running gag is that one member of either her or Lincoln's family refers to one of them as the other's boyfriend/girlfriend which they both instantly deny. However, it is implied multiple times throughout the first seasons of The Loud House and some of the graphic novels that they harbor feelings for each other.

=== Bobby Santiago ===
Roberto Alejandro Martínez-Millán Luis "Bobby" Santiago Jr. (voiced by Carlos PenaVega, portrayed by Matt Van Smith in A Loud House Christmas, Damian Alonso in The Really Loud House) is a 17-year-old (18-year-old season 5 onward) boy who is Lori's boyfriend and the older brother of Ronnie Anne. He wears a cream T-shirt, a green jacket, blue jeans, a black and yellow belt, and brown shoes. Bobby does a lot of odd jobs in Royal Woods. In "Save the Date", it is shown that Bobby will retaliate if his sister Ronnie Anne is offended, even if it means breaking up with Lori (to that point he immediately regrets doing it). Although he and his family moved away to live with the Casagrande family in Great Lakes City in "The Loudest Mission: Relative Chaos", Bobby and Lori managed to find a way to make their relationship work. Originally working in the Casagrande family bodega as a cashier and stockboy, Bobby developed a tendency to become trapped in the dairy freezer, as seen in "City Slickers" and "The Spies Who Loved Me". In "Movers and Fakers", Bobby moves into his own apartment in the same building to get his own space after a former tenant moves to France. In "Cupid's Harrow", Bobby and Lori separate when Bobby is offered to run a satellite version of Hector's mercado in Mexico. In "Living the Dream Boat", Bobby enlists Lincoln to get him on The Dream Boat where he poses as a taxidermy from Portland, Oregon named Jeremy. He fails when Lori picks Jett from Aspen. After the cruise where Lori learns that Jett wants her to move away from her family and gets Jeremy's address, Lori learns about Bobby's plot from the real Jeremy and Lincoln causing her to go to Mexico. They end up getting getting back together with both families present.

=== Maria Santiago ===
Maria Santiago (voiced by Sumalee Montano) is Ronnie Anne and Bobby's mother, Carlos' sister, and Rosa and Hector's daughter. She works as a nurse at a local hospital. When the Santiago's move to Great Lakes City, Maria works at the local hospital as an emergency room nurse. In at least two episodes so far, she is shown to have childish arguments with her brother Carlos.

=== Arturo Santiago ===
Dr. Arturo Santiago (voiced by Eugenio Derbez, understudied by Fabio Tassone in The Loud House episode "Day of the Dad" and The Casagrandes Movie) is Bobby and Ronnie Anne's father who works as a doctor at Physicians with Missions who have their headquarters in Great Lakes City. He is currently operating in Peru where he helped to build a hospital. Arturo's work is liked by Carlos Casagrande and Hector Casagrande develops a scowling look when around him implying that he was not pleased with Maria and Arturo's divorce. In "Operation Dad", Arturo visits Great Lakes City for a conference causing Ronnie Anne to find a way to make him move in after roughing it for some time. After some attempts fail, Ronnie Anne was able to see him off. Upon looking at the scrapbook she left him, Arturo contacts his boss at Physician Without Missions to let him work at Great Lakes City's Physicians Without Missions HQ while another doctor covers for him. In "Teacher's Fret" it is revealed that he dated Ronnie Anne's teacher, Mrs. Gina Galiano, but they broke up due to their differences.

=== Rosa Casagrande ===
Rosa Casagrande (voiced by Sonia Manzano) is Ronnie Anne and Bobby's grandmother, Maria and Carlos' mother, and Lupe and Lazaro's daughter. She is the matriarch of the Casagrande family and the building manager of their apartment building. Rosa is a skilled cook and uses a variety of home remedies to heal people and ward off spirits. In "15 Candles", it is revealed that Rosa was unable to have a Quinceañera when she was young.

=== Hector Casagrande ===
Hector Rodrigo Casagrande Gutiérrez (voiced by Ruben Garfias) is Ronnie Anne and Bobby's grandfather and Maria and Carlos' father. He is the patriarch of the Casagrande family and the proprietor of the Casagrande Mercado on the ground floor of the family's apartment building. Hector is gossipy and knows how to play the guitar while also having his own band. In "Battle of the Grandpas", it is revealed that Hector used to be a bull rider in his youth.

=== Carlos Casagrande ===
Carlos Casagrande Sr. (voiced by Carlos Alazraqui) is Ronnie Anne and Bobby's uncle, Maria's brother, and Rosa and Hector's son. He is a high-spirited and sensitive father of four and works as a professor at Chavez University. Carlos reads many books and can dispense rather inane trivia. In "Going Overboard", it was revealed that he was a popular skater in college named Carlos X. He had to stop after marrying Frida. In "Skaters Gonna Hate", it is revealed that Carlos in his alias of Carlos X had a history with Tony Hawk.

=== Frida Puga-Casagrande ===
Frida Puga-Casagrande (voiced by Roxana Ortega) is Ronnie Anne and Bobby's aunt and Carlos' wife. She is an avid artist and photographer who becomes emotional over various mundane moments and bursts into tears at the drop of a hat. In addition, Frida contributes art to The Art Space. In "Miss Step", it is revealed that Frida is an expert at Baile Folklorico. She is named after the artist Frida Kahlo (often her eyebrows showing together in reference to the unibrow she had), while her maiden name is named after staff member Miguel Puga.

=== Carlota Casagrande ===
Carlota Casagrande (voiced by Alexa PenaVega) is the eldest of Carlos and Frida's children, their only daughter, Rosa and Hector's granddaughter, and the cousin of Bobby and Ronnie Anne. She is a cheerful, happy-go-lucky admirer of vintage fashion and has a following on social media.

=== Carlos "CJ" Casagrande Jr. ===
Carlos "CJ" Casagrande Jr. (voiced by Jared Kozak) is the second eldest and the eldest son of Carlos and Frida's children, Rosa and Hector's grandson, and the cousin of Bobby and Ronnie Anne. He has Down syndrome and possesses a very sunny disposition. CJ loves to play pretend games and likes pirates. The episode "Short Cut" reveals that CJ is good at cutting hair.

=== Carlino "Carl" Casagrande ===
Carlino "Carl" Casagrande (voiced by Alex Cazares) is the second youngest of Carlos and Frida's children, Rosa and Hector's grandson, and the cousin of Bobby and Ronnie Anne. He has a selfish and macho personality and hatches a variety of get-rich-quick schemes, but is ultimately very childish. Carl likes to play with toys, especially trains. In addition, he also has a crush on Lori much to the dismay of Lori and Bobby. In "Slink or Swim", Carl was revealed to not be able to swim until Bobby taught him in exchange that Carl teaches him how to tie his shoes. As seen in "Do the Fruit Shake", Carl is shown to be an expert DJ. Despite his selfishness, he still really cares about his family.

=== Carlitos Casagrande ===
Carlitos Casagrande (voiced by Roxana Ortega up to episode 6 of The Casagrandes, Cristina Milizia from episode 7 of The Casagrandes onward) is the youngest of Carlos and Frida's children, Rosa and Hector's grandson and the cousin of Ronnie Anne. He has noticeably orange hair and a propensity to mimic those around him. He is just beginning to learn how to talk as seen in "Copy Can't".

=== Other Casagrande family members ===
- Lupe (voiced by Angélica Aragón) is the mother of Rosa, the mother-in-law of Hector, the grandmother of Maria and Carlos, and the great-grandmother of Ronnie Anne, Bobby, Carlota, C.J., Carl and Carlitos, who lives in Mexico.
- Danny Puga (voiced by Danny Trejo) is the father of Frida, the grandfather of Carlota, C.J., Carl, and Carlos, and the great-uncle of Ronnie and Anne and Bobby. He works as a stunt performer.

=== Casagrande family pets ===
The Casagrandes have pets of their own:

- Sergio (voiced by Carlos Alazraqui) is the Casagrande family's pet scarlet macaw. He has a sassy personality and acts like an alarm clock. He is named after cartoonist Sergio Aragonés, famous for his work in Mad Magazine.
- Lalo (vocal effects provided by Dee Bradley Baker) is the Casagrande family's friendly pet English Mastiff. Despite his large size, he is easily scared. In the episode "Perro Malo", it is revealed that Lalo was adopted as a puppy by Hector, and has a twin brother named Malo. He is named after cartoonist Lalo Alcaraz, author of the comic strip La Cucaracha; editorial cartoons; and the show's cultural consultant, consulting producer, and writer.
- Paco (voiced by Sergio Aragonés) is a yellow-headed blue parrot who is Lupe's pet and a "cousin" of Sergio. He learned English from television and often has to help Lupe with translation. In the episode "The Golden Curse", he married a pigeon named Paulina. The Casagrandes Movie shows that Paco and Paulina later adopted numerous Mexican birds as children.

== The Chang family ==
The Changs are a Chinese American family that arrive in Great Lakes City and moved into Apartment 3A above the Casagrandes' apartment.

=== Sid Chang ===
Sidney "Sid" Chang (voiced by Leah Mei Gold) is the cheerful, happy-go-lucky, energetic and high-spirited 12-year-old daughter of Stanley and Becca Chang, Adelaide's older sister, and Ronnie Anne's best friend and neighbor. In "Friended! with the Casagrandes", the two of them meet and quickly become best friends. Sid always wants to try new things. She is also an expert at robotics.

=== Stanley Chang ===
Stanley Chang (voiced by Ken Jeong) is the Chinese father of Sid and Adelaide. He works as a subway conductor in Great Lakes City's subway system called the GLART (short for Great Lakes Area Rapid Transit).

=== Becca Chang ===
Becca Chang (voiced by Melissa Joan Hart) is the mother of Sid and Adelaide and the wife of Stanley. She works as a zoologist. The episode "How to Train Your Carl" reveals that Becca is currently working at the Great Lakes City Zoo.

=== Adelaide Chang ===
Adelaide Chang (voiced by Lexi Sexton) is the six-year-old sister of Sid. Sid describes her as a "professional sass bucket." Adelaide can be emotional as seen in "Croaked" when her pet frog Froggy passed away. The episode "Karate Chops" reveals that Adelaide is an expert at karate and has karate skills that surpass Carl's. She also has a love for animals that is comparable to Lana's love for them.

=== Froggy 2 ===
Froggy 2 (vocal effects provided by Dee Bradley Baker) is a frog who is Adelaide's pet and the successor of her late pet Froggy.

=== Breakfast Bot ===
Breakfast Bot (voiced by Carlos Alazraqui) is a robot created by Sid Chang who has a toaster for a chest and upper back, a toaster oven for an abdomen and lower back, a spatula for a right hand, a whisk for a left hand, and one wheel instead of legs.

== Royal Woods citizens ==
This section lists recurring characters who are citizens of Royal Woods, with these characters apperaring mainly in The Loud House:

=== Royal Woods Elementary School ===
This section lists the faculty and students of Royal Woods Elementary School:

- Wilbur T. Huggins (voiced by Stephen Tobolowsky) is the principal of Royal Woods Elementary School.
- Agnes Johnson (voiced by Susanne Blakeslee) is a fifth-grade teacher at Royal Woods Elementary School who Lincoln and Clyde had as a teacher, until "Schooled!" when Lincoln and Clyde now attend middle school.
- Cheryl Farrell (voiced by Grey DeLisle) is the school secretary at Royal Woods Elementary School who speaks with a Southern accent. The episode "Schooled!" reveals that Cheryl has a younger twin sister named Meryl who looks and talks exactly like her (except with a few differences) and works at Royal Woods Middle School.
- Coach Pacowski (voiced by Jeff Bennett) is a gym teacher at Royal Woods Elementary School with a stern and authoritarian personality who has a crush on Agnes Johnson. In "Teachers' Union", it is revealed that Coach Pacowski enjoys mini-golf, has never left Michigan, and lives on a houseboat with his mother. Following a failed date with Agnes, he starts to fall in love with Nurse Patti after she patched him up from his obstacle course injuries and found out that they have a common hobby.
- Darcy Helmandollar (voiced by Mariel Sheets) is a girl who is Lisa's friend. She owns a plush toy giraffe named Raffo. By the events of "InTODDnito", Darcy is a little bit taller than Lisa.
- Miss Allegra (voiced by Sabrina Fest in "Community Disservice", Debi Derryberry in 2020–present, portrayed by Kate Bergeron in The Really Loud House) is a first grade teacher. She had Lana and Lola as students in season four and later gained Lisa as a student in season five.
- The Morticians Club are a group of goth children that Lucy is co-president of and are fans of The Vampires of Melancholia.
  - Bertrand (voiced by James Arnold Taylor) is a small boy who is the original president of the Morticians Club. He resigned from his position in "A Grave Mistake" after his father Brad got a job on a party cruise called the S.S. Funtime forcing his family to move from Royal Woods. In "The Loathe Boat", Bertrand became uncomfortable being on the S.S. Funtime cruise with Brad and his mother Kim causing him to send a message pelican to the Morticians Club to remove him from it during its time on the shores of Lake Eddy. After every attempt failed, Lucy helped Bertrand come clean by mentioning how the S.S. Funtime had made him miserable. As a compromise, Brad and Kim allowed Bertrand to stay with his Aunt Madeline in Royal Woods until they return from Croatia.
  - Boris (voiced by Nika Futterman, portrayed by Joshua Gallup in The Really Loud House) is a tall, thin, and bald-headed member of the Morticians Club who plays the keyboard.
  - Dante (voiced by Cristina Pucelli, portrayed by Max Malas in The Really Loud House) is a short round member of the Morticians Club. He owns a pet snake.
  - Haiku (voiced by Georgie Kidder, portrayed by Hannah Alltmont in The Really Loud House) is an 8-year-old (9-year-old season 5 onward) goth girl who is Lucy's best friend and co-president of the school's Morticians Club that Lucy is a part of, originally introduced as one of Lincoln's dates in "Dance, Dance Resolution". She has a hairstyle in which some of her hair covers her left eye. Haiku has a crush on an ostensibly 200-year-old vampire. In "A Grave Mistake", she and Lucy become co-presidents of the Morticians Club after Bertrand leaves Royal Woods. She is named after the poetry form Haiku.
  - Morpheus (voiced by Richard Steven Horvitz) is a tall member of the Morticians Club who wears a blue cape. He owns a pet crow named Thorn.
  - Persephone (voiced by Lara Jill Miller) is a tall member of the Morticians Club who carries around a parasol.
- Norm (voiced by Jeff Bennett) is the janitor at Royal Woods Elementary School. He secretly keeps a friendly mutated rat with green eyes and two tails named Cinnamon in the school's basement because he did not want him to be studied by scientists. Lincoln, Clyde, Stella, Zach, Rusty, and Liam eventually find out by investigating rumors of a 'rat beast', but assure Norm they will keep his secret.
- Nurse Patti (voiced by Lara Jill Miller) is a friendly school nurse at Royal Woods Elementary who is Coach Pacowski's girlfriend because of their shared mini-golf hobby.
- Sasha (voiced by Marlow Barkley in "The Write Stuff", Georgie Kidder in "Sand Hassles", Debi Derryberry in "Wild Goss Chase", Lucy Rubiner in "Summer Camp: Don't Lose Your Cool" and "Nobody Puts Baby in a Corral") is a fourth grade student who is a member of Royal Woods Elementary School's writing club.

=== Royal Woods Middle School ===
This section lists the faculty and students of Royal Woods Middle School:

- Principal Ramirez (voiced by Marisol Nichols, portrayed by Susie Castillo in The Really Loud House) is the stern yet fair principal of Royal Woods Middle School. A running gag is that she gets dragged into viewing Lincoln's slide shows about certain things that he wants to address to her.
- The Action News Team is the group of school news in Royal Woods Middle School that is formed by Lincoln, Clyde, and their gang of friends:
  - Liam Hunnicutt (voiced by Lara Jill Miller, portrayed by Gavin Maddox Bergman in The Really Loud House and A Really Haunted Loud House) is Lincoln's 11-year-old (12-year-old season 5 onward) friend with a bowl cut who speaks in a Southern accent and lives on a farm. He enjoys loud music, exclaiming that he wants the music "turned up to eleven", a reference to This Is Spinal Tap. As of "Schooled!", Liam now attends middle school.
  - Rusty Spokes (voiced by Wyatt Griswold in 2016–2020, Owen Rivera-Babbey in 2020–2021, Diego Alexander in 2021–present, portrayed by Nolan Maddox in The Really Loud House and A Really Haunted Loud House) is the 11-year-old (12-year-old season 5 onward) talkative member of an unnamed bicycle group who is one of Lincoln's schoolmates. Although making fun of Lincoln and his bike in "Hand-Me-Downer", he later becomes one of Lincoln's friends. In "Back in Black", it is revealed that Rusty has a brother named Rocky (Note: Rocky is voiced by Ethan Mora) who has a mutual crush on Lucy. In "Pasture Bedtime", it is revealed that Rusty is allergic to hot sauce. As of "Schooled!", Rusty now attends Royal Woods Middle School and his voice is now deeper.
  - Stella Zhou (voiced by Haley Tju, portrayed by Trinity Jo-Li Bliss in The Really Loud House and A Really Haunted Loud House) is an 11-year-old (12-year-old season 5 onward) Filipina American girl who moved to Royal Woods. She was initially recognized by her bow and hair bun hairstyle in "White Hare" before being introduced in "Be Stella My Heart" no longer sporting a bow and hair bun and of a considerably taller stature. Lincoln, Clyde, Liam, Rusty, and Zach thought that Stella had a crush on them until she stated that she just wanted to be friends with them, which they did. In "Schooled!", Stella now attends Royal Woods Middle School. In "Swimming Fools", it is revealed that Stella is Principal Ramirez' neighbor.
  - Zachary "Zach" Gurdle (voiced by Jessica DiCicco, portrayed by Mateo Castel in The Really Loud House and A Really Haunted Loud House) is an 11-year-old (12-year-old season 5 onward) bespectacled red-haired boy who is one of Lincoln's friends and schoolmates. He is obsessed with conspiracy theories and aliens, and believes the U.S. government is spying on his family. According to Lincoln in "Overnight Success", Zach lives "between a freeway and a circus." In "Pasture Bedtime", it is revealed that Zach's hair is vulnerable to certain hair dyes that cause his hair to fall off temporarily. As of "Schooled!", Zach now attends middle school.
- Boy Jordan (voiced by Ari Castleton in "Exchange of Heart", Jessica McKenna in "Frame on You", "Steeling Thunder", and "Spy Dames") is a student at Royal Woods Elementary School. By season five, Boy Jordan attends Royal Woods Middle School and takes part in photography.
- Chandler McCann (voiced by Daniel DiVenere) is one of the most popular children in Royal Woods Elementary School. He attends Royal Woods Middle School as of "Schooled!". Chandler first appeared in "The Waiting Game" and while originally appearing in a minor recurring role from seasons 1–4, Chandler gradually develops into Lincoln's arch-rival starting from the premiere of Season 5. So far, the episode "Jeers for Fears" has been the only episode in which Chandler showed genuine respect towards Lincoln and Clyde.
  - Trent (voiced by Tristian Chase in "Save the Date", Gunnar Sizemore in "Deal Me Out", Steele Gagnon in "Jeers for Fears", Archer Vattano in 2023–present) is a boy who is often seen associated with Chandler.
- Chef Pat (voiced by James Arnold Taylor in "Kernal of Truth", Alex Cazares in 2021–present) is the school chef at Royal Woods Middle School who went to Royal Woods High School with Rita when they were friends. The food she serves ranges from appetizing to non-appetizing. The episode "Diss the Cook" had Chef Pat serving Lincoln's big sisters throughout her career with awful lunches because she thought she wasn't invited to Rita's graduation party. This was rectified when the graduation party invitation was found in the last library book she used in Royal Woods High School causing Rita to arrange for a re-enactment of her graduation party.
- Coach Keck (voiced by Grey DeLisle, portrayed by Caroline Christopher in The Really Loud House) is the gym teacher at Royal Woods Middle School. The episode "Frame on You" revealed that Coach Keck is near-sighted and just got some new glasses. In "No Fun Run", it is revealed that Coach Keck is fit enough to run to school without ever needing a car.
- Crikey (vocal effects provided by Cree Summer) is a red kangaroo that was accidentally purchased by Coach Keck instead of the costume of a kangaroo mascot costume. He is often hyperactive due to the energy drinks he consumes and tends to kick-box anyone. The episode "Kanga-Ruse" reveals that Liam trains Crikey for his halftime show.
- Girl Jordan (voiced by Catherine Taber) is one of Lincoln's 11-year-old (12-year-old season 5 onward) classmates. The two of them notably share a dodgeball rivalry. She is named and designed after staff member Jordan Rosato. As of "Schooled!", she now attends middle school.
- Kara (voiced by Scarlett Estevez) is a girl whose family runs the Comic Book Nook. After "Kara-less Whisper", she becomes part of Lincoln's gang of friends.
- Maddie (voiced by Tara Strong) is a cinnamon-haired girl and one of Lynn's friends who is a member of each of her sports teams.
- Margo Roberts (voiced by Lara Jill Miller in 2016–2018, Brec Bassinger in 2019–present) is Lynn's best friend who is a member of each of her sports teams.
- Meryl Farrell (voiced by Grey DeLisle) is the school secretary at Royal Woods Middle School and the younger twin sister of Cheryl with light brown hair and a mole on her right cheek.
- Mr. Bolhofner (voiced by James Arnold Taylor, portrayed by Brian Thomas Smith in The Really Loud House) is a very strict German American math teacher, home economics teacher, professional hunter, and a former soldier in the army in his 30s. Mr. Bolhofner expects his students to be in his classroom on time. Starting in season five, he now teaches his class in a wooden class trailer in the back of the main building where Lincoln and Chandler are two of his students. In addition, Mr. Bolhofner's appearance has gotten sloppy and he is shown to have a pet piranha named Hank. The episode "Rumor Has It" had rumors about Mr. Bolhofner being either an escaped convict, a mobster, or a cannibal named "Skullhofner" which are false. It is also revealed that he can do bear wrestling. In "For Sale By Loner", it is revealed that Mr. Bolhofner lives in a cabin in the woods to enjoy some peace and quiet, dislikes sports because his father was the head coach of his school's wrestling team, and becomes stressed by puzzles. Both "The Orchid Grief" and "Snow News Day" reveal that Mr. Bolhofner lost the big toe on his left foot in the former and an unspecified toe in the latter from unknown incidents even though they appeared intact in "Kara-less Whisper" and "Brain Man". Both the animated and the live-action shows reveal that Mr. Bolhofner can provide aid in the case of missions of love due to having memories of his previous love interests.
- Mrs. Salter (voiced by Nika Futterman) is a teacher at Royal Woods Middle School who has Clyde, Liam, Rusty, Zach, and Stella as students. According to Lynn, she is one of the nice teachers.
- Paula Price (voiced by Cree Summer) is a crippled girl in a right leg cast and crutches who is a member of the Turkey Jerkies. She is also part of Lynn's other sports teams despite her disability.
- Trevor Bernard Budden (voiced by Trevor Devall) is the music teacher and glee club president at Royal Woods Middle School. His first name was revealed in "Man of My Schemes". The episode "No Fun Run" revealed that Trevor starred in different athletic plays and got fit from them.

=== Royal Woods High School ===
This section lists the faculty and students of Royal Woods High School:

- Principal Rivers (voiced by Mela Lee) is the principal of Royal Woods High School. She is shown to be indecisive on certain things.
- Becky (voiced by Lara Jill Miller) is a girl who is one of Lori and Leni's friends and one of Lori's classmates. In "Deal Me Out", it is revealed that Becky is a fan of Ace Savvy.
- Benjamin "Benny" Stein (voiced by Jessica DiCicco in 2017, Sean Giambrone in 2019–present) is a boy who is Luan's boyfriend. They start to have this relationship as shown in the episode "Stage Plight" where they kiss in Mrs. Bernardo's production of Romeo & Juliet. Benny has a marionette named Mrs. Appleblossom. In Luan's second Listen Out Loud podcast, it is revealed that Benny has a neighbor who leads a group of werewolf enthusiasts. In season six, Benny is shown to do jobs at different places like Dairyland and Burpin' Burger. His last name was revealed in the "Winter Special" graphic novel.
- Joey (voiced by Richard Steven Horvitz) is a friend of Lori and Leni who often does studying. In "Deal Me Out", it is revealed that he is a fan of Ace Savvy. In "Music to My Fears", it is revealed that Joey plays the tuba in the school's marching band.
- Kate Bernardo (voiced by Grey Griffin) is the drama teacher at Royal Woods High School who is an expert at one-person plays. While originally depicted as a tan-skinned woman with brown hair in "Jeers for Fears", she was later redesigned with light skin and black hair.
- Mandee (voiced by Ariel Fournier) is Leni's other best friend from high school. She is very good at a Twister-like game called "Froot Tangle" and is able to understand what people are saying when they say something wrong or awkwardly.
- Mazzy (voiced by Cristina Pucelli in "L is for Love", Ry Chase in 2020–present) is one of Luna's friends who is a member of the Moon Goats.
- Sam Sharp (voiced by Jill Talley in "L is for Love", Alyson Stoner in 2019–present, portrayed by Zoë DuVall in A Loud House Christmas, Angelina Boris in The Really Loud House) is a 15-year-old (16-year-old from season 5 onward) girl and Luna's girlfriend who is one of her fellow musicians in the Moon Goats and classmates. Sam has a younger brother named Simon, whom she considers as very obnoxious. Lana's second "Listen Out Loud" podcast and the episode "Animal House" reveal that Sam volunteers at the Royal Woods Pet Adoption Center alongside Lana.
- Spencer (voiced by Ogie Banks) is a student and professional basketball player who is a mutual friend of Lori and Luan where he partakes in Theater Club and the Sports Clubs.
- Sully (voiced by A.J. LoCascio) is one of Luna's friends who is a member of the Moon Goats and he plays the keyboard. Before his name was officially revealed, he was created to hide the surprise that Sam was female (and by extension, that Luna was LGBT) until the very end of their debut episode, as "Sam" is a gender-neutral name.
- Ellie (voiced by Jessica DiCicco in "Party Down", Kimberly Brooks in "Electshunned", Tiana Camacho in "Prom-Com") is a friend of Lori and Leni. Her name did not get revealed until "Prom-Com".
- Jackie (voiced by Romi Dames) is one of Leni's best friends from school. She has a younger brother named Sebastian who she cares about very much. Jackie was interested in being a veterinarian, but starts to have second thoughts. She is also interested in theater since she is part of the drama club with Luan and Benny.

-->

=== Sunset Canyon Retirement Home ===
This section lists the people that resides at Sunset Canyon Retirement Home, where Albert "Pop Pop", Myrtle, and Gayle are also residents:

- Bernie (voiced by Fred Tatasciore) is an elderly man who is one of Albert's friends and has a tendency to lose his false teeth as seen in "Head Poet's Anxiety". The episode "Resident Upheaval" reveals that Bernie is on the Sunset Canyon Retirement Home board. The episode "Rough Patch" revealed that Bernie was around when Reininger's first opened.
- Scoots (voiced by Grey DeLisle, portrayed by Jill Jane Clements in A Loud House Christmas) is a sarcastic old woman in sunglasses with a rebellious streak who is mostly seen riding on a mobility scooter and is friends with Albert. She lives at Sunset Canyon Retirement Home, enjoys their pudding, and likes to cause trouble for others when she can. The episode "Resident Upheaval" reveals that Scoots is the head of the Sunset Canyon Retirement Home board.
- Seymour (voiced by Rob Paulsen) is a short elderly African-American man who is one of Albert's friends. In "Insta-gran", it is revealed that Seymour's left eye has a mind of its own. The episode "Resident Upheaval" reveals that Seymour is on the Sunset Canyon Retirement Home board.

=== Other Royal Woods citizens ===
- Augusto "Gus" Gamesngrub (voiced by Paul Scheer, opera singing voice provided by Julián Rebolledo) is the proprietor of the arcade/pizzeria Gus' Games & Grub which he co-founded with his dad.
- Bud Grouse (voiced by John DiMaggio, portrayed by Peter Breitmayer in The Really Loud House) is the elderly, bald-headed, and grumpy neighbor of the Loud family in his 70s whose first name was revealed in the Family Tree graphic novel and the episode "The Write Stuff". In "11 Louds a Leapin'", it is revealed that Mr. Grouse tends to confiscate any items belonging to the Loud siblings that accidentally end up on his property (including Bobby). It is also revealed that Bud has a large extended family that he cannot visit due to financial difficulties. In most episodes, it is shown that Bud can be bribed with certain foods like Lynn Sr.'s lasagna in exchange for favors. The episode "Cuff Break" revealed that Bud used to be called "Doo Wop" during middle school where his middle school knowledge came in handy at the time when he and Lincoln were victims of a magic handcuff snafu.
- Chester "Chunk" Monk (voiced by John DiMaggio) is a burly man with a shaved head and a nose ring who is Luna's roadie. In "Roadie to Nowhere", Chunk's real name is revealed to be Chester. He was also revealed to have been a musical alumnus at Royal Woods High School and moved from Britain when he was young. In the same episode, it is revealed that he has his own band called Chunk and the Pieces and a flat that he lives in when he isn't doing events that do not require him to sleep in his van. Aside from this, he also works as a roadie for other bands as seen in the graphic novel Loud and Proud.
- Dana Dufresne (voiced by Maddie Taylor) is a host of several pageants Lola competes in. She is introduced in "Toads and Tiaras" while passing as male and has transitioned by "Gown and Out".
- Dr. Shuttleworth (voiced by Mindy Sterling, understudied by Alex Cazares in "Recipe for Destruction") is the proprietor of the Shuttleworth Daycare Academy which contains Royal Woods Preschool (AKA Baby Bunker Preschool) that Lily attends.
- Fiona (voiced by Alex Ryan) is a worker at Reininger's who is Leni's co-worker and work friend.
- Grant (voiced by Grant Palmer) is a worker at Burpin' Burger who is a two-time employee of the month. When Lynn Sr. opened up Lynn's Table, Grant got a second job there.
- Katherine Mulligan (voiced in the animated series and portrayed in A Loud House Christmas by Catherine Taber) is a news reporter. The episode "Scoop Snoop" revealed that she's dating Rodney Spokes. The episode "Child's Play" reveals that she hosts a talk show called "Kat Chat".
- Kotaro (voiced by Phil LaMarr) is a Japanese-American man who is Lynn Sr.'s best friend and band-mate who plays the keyboard. When Lynn Sr. opened up Lynn's Table, Kotaro became one of the waiters. In Clyde's Listen Out Loud episode that had him shadowing Lynn Sr., it is revealed that Kotaro is on good terms with Mr. Grouse. In "Dad Reputation", Kotaro joins Lynn Loud Sr.'s band The Doo-Dads, where he plays the cowbell.
- Lindsay Sweetwater (voiced by Jessica DiCicco) is a pageant girl who is Lola's rival.
- Mimi Hunnicut (voiced by Sainty Nelsen) is the grandmother of Liam Hunnicutt. The episode "Hunn-cut Gems" reveals that Mimi Hunnicut wears a wig and her leg falls asleep while riding a tractor.
- Miguel (voiced by Tonatiuh Elizarraraz) is a worker at Reininger's who is Leni's co-worker and work friend. He is also a part-time yoga instructor.
- Mr. Gurdle (voiced by Curtis Armstrong) is the father of Zach. Like his son, he is obsessed with conspiracy theories and aliens.
- Mrs. Gurdle (voiced by Grey DeLisle) is the mother of Zach. Like her son, she is obsessed with conspiracy theories and aliens. The episode "Kernel of Truth" revealed that she was part of a news team back when she attended Royal Woods Middle School.
- Ms. Carmichael (voiced by Kari Wahlgren) is the manager of Reininger's who becomes Leni's boss when she is hired there.
- Paraag (voiced by Behzad Dabu) is an Indian-American barista at The Burnt Bean who is Luan's co-worker. He was born in Mumbai, India where he moved to the United States with his sister while his parents remained in Mumbai.
- Patchy Drizzle (voiced by John DiMaggio) is a weatherman in Royal Woods.
- Phillip "Flip" Phillipini (voiced by John DiMaggio, portrayed by Kevin Chamberlin in The Really Loud House and A Really Haunted Loud House) is the cheap and smug middle-aged owner of the gas station Flip's Food & Fuel who is also a con artist and an opportunist. Flip owns a number of side businesses under different names. The episode "A Flipmas Carol" reveals Flip got his swindling tendencies when he was scammed by Scoots with a fake ticket to his middle school Christmas dance. In No Time to Spy, it is revealed that he has a cousin who looks and behaves exactly like him named Flop Phillipini.
  - Nacho (vocal effects provided by Audrey Wasilewski) is Flip's raccoon companion.
- Rodney Spokes (voiced by Richard Steven Horvitz) is the father of Rusty and Rocky Spokes who works at the clothing store Duds for Dudes. In "Scoop Snoop" it is revealed that he is dating Katherine Mulligan and he calls her his "News Boo". In "Dad Reputation", Rodney joins Lynn Loud Sr.'s band The Doo-Dads, and plays the drums.
- T-Bone (voiced by Fred Tatasciore in "Hand-Me-Downer" and "The Old and the Restless", John DiMaggio in "Can't Hardly Wait", Brian Stepanek in "Snoop's On") is a biker who later gets befriended by Albert.
- Theresa Davis (voiced by Yvette Nicole Brown) is the Mayor of Royal Woods. She cares very much about the citizens as she puts their safety and concerns before her own. In Lana's second "Listen Out Loud" podcast, it is revealed that Mayor Davis can do Capoeira. Her first name was revealed in the episode "Electshunned" when she won her mayoral election against Leni.
- Tyler (voiced by John DiMaggio) is a buff blond-haired man who is Scoots' boyfriend and the older cousin of Mandee. He is also an expert disc jockey and he went to fashion school.

== Great Lakes City citizens ==
This section lists recurring characters who are citizens of Great Lakes City, with these characters apperaring mainly in The Casagrandes:

=== The Casagrandes' apartment neighbors ===
This section lists the neighbors of the Casagrandes and the Changs in the apartment where they lives:

- Apartment 3B:
  - Alexis Flores (voiced by Nika Futterman in The Loud House episode "Room for Improvement with the Casagrandes" to The Casagrandes episode "What's Love Gato Do with It?", Diego Olmedo in 2020–2021, Connor Andrade in 2022–present) is the son of Mrs. Flores who plays the tuba even when in the Cesar Chavez Academy junior band.
  - Mrs. Flores (voiced by Michelle C. Bonilla) is a woman who is the mother of Alexis.
  - Buttercup (vocal effects provided by Carlos Alazraqui) is Mrs. Flores' pet chihuahua. She has a tendency to eat anything in sight.
- Apartment 4A:
  - Mrs. Kernicky (voiced by Lauri Fraser) is an elderly woman who enjoys working out. The episode "A Very Casagrandes Christmas" reveals that she is a member of the Polar Bear Club where they enjoy cold swimming. In "Strife Coach", Mrs. Kernicky becomes the new gym teacher at Cesar Chavez Academy.
- Apartment 4B:
  - Margarita (voiced by Krizia Bajos) is a Puerto Rican hairdresser. She is the proprietor of a salon called "Margarita's Beauty" that is across the street from her apartment building and often shares some gossip with Hector when she buys some things at the Casagrande Mercado.
  - Fluffy and Pickles are Margarita's pet dogs. Fluffy is a Scottish Terrier who can only eat organic foods while Pickles is a pug who likes to play in mud puddles.
- Apartment 4C:
  - Mr. Nakamura (voiced by Bruce Locke) is a Japanese American man, father of Cory, and who is often accompanied by his dog Nelson.
  - Cory Nakamura (voiced by Eric Bauza) is the teenage son of Mr. Nakamura who is an expert gamer. The episode "Store Wars with the Casagrandes" reveals that he is an insomniac.
  - Nelson (vocal effects provided by Eric Bauza) is a Bearded Collie owned by Mr. Nakamura. He is revealed to be allergic to bees and is often trained to be a better pet by his owner. In "Never Friending Story", it is revealed that Nelson can't eat almonds as it makes him poop a lot.
- Apartment 4D:
  - Miranda (voiced by Cristina Pucelli) is a woman who is the roommate of Georgia. She is shown to be good at playing hacky sack. In "Flight Plan", it is revealed that Miranda dislikes horror movies.
  - Georgia (voiced by Shondalia White) is an African-American woman who is the roommate of Miranda. She is an expert at making a house of cards.
  - Ninja (vocal effects provided by Fred Tatasciore) is a St. Bernard who is owned by Miranda and Georgia. He has a tendency to sleep in any location.

=== Cesar Chavez Academy ===
This section lists the faculty and students of the Great Lakes City school Cesar Chavez Academy:

- Principal Valenzuela (voiced by Carolina Ravassa) is the principal of Cesar Chavez Academy.
- Becky (voiced by Abby Trott) is a girl at Cesar Chavez Academy who is into masked wrestling and bullying. In "Throwing Pains", it is revealed that Becky doesn't feel cold on even the coldest days. The episode "Perro Malo" reveals that Becky is the owner of Lalo's aggressive twin brother Malo.
- Casey (voiced by Christian J. Simon in 2018 of The Loud House and 2020–2021 of The Casagrandes, Jay Hatton in 2021–present) is the cool Cuban-American skateboarding friend of Ronnie Anne who wears a checkered baseball hat backward. "Gossipy Girl" reveals that Casey keeps a jar of baby teeth in his hat.
- Gina Galiano (voiced by Elizabeth Bond) is Ronnie Anne's homeroom teacher at Cesar Chavez Academy. In "Teacher's Fret", it is revealed that Mrs. Galiano was in a relationship with Arturo but they broke up do to having differences.
- Laird (voiced by Sean Kenin) is a clumsy and awkward student at Cesar Chavez Academy with cone-shaped hair who is one of Ronnie Anne's friends and was formerly home-schooled. Laird is prone to being a victim of various misfortunes that happen to him. In "Home Improvement", it is revealed that Laird lives in a mansion. "Gossipy Girl" revealed that he picks his nose with his feet and he still carries his baby blanket that he has never washed.
- Nikki (voiced by Natalie Coughlin) is a tall, skateboarding girl who is friends with Ronnie Anne. "Gossipy Girl" revealed that she is afraid of sock puppets and her right big toe is very hairy.
- Sameer (voiced by Makana Say in 2018 of The Loud House and 2019–2020 of The Casagrandes, Nour Jude Assaf in 2020–2021, Jacob Mattathiparambil Lukose in 2021–2022, Aryan Simhadri in 2022–present) is one of Ronnie Anne's skateboarding friends who sports a missing tooth and big rugged hair. He is revealed to have previously lived in Kansas. "Gossipy Girl" revealed that he wears lifts in his shoes to appear taller.

=== Other Great Lakes City citizens ===
- Bitsy (vocal effects provided by Dee Bradley Baker) is an African elephant living at the Great Lakes City Zoo.
- Bruno (voiced by Eric Bauza) is a hot dog vendor in Great Lakes City who owns a hot dog stand called "Hawt Dog", and good friend of Hector and Vito.
- Jim Sparkletooth (voiced by Andrew Morgado) is a news reporter in Great Lakes City. He is also the host of "Dirty Secrets" where he exposes dirty secrets around Great Lakes City.
- Marcus (voiced by Carlos Alazraqui in "Walk Don't Run", Sean Crisden in 2021–present) is an animal control officer in Great Lakes City.
- Maybelle (voiced by Telma Hopkins) is an elderly African American woman with sunglasses and a picky and demanding personality who is a regular customer at the Casagrande Mercado where she often buys mangos. In "Do the Fruit Shake", it was revealed that Maybelle was part of a musical trio called the Tropical Fruits under the stage name of Mango.
- Mr. Scully (voiced by Phil LaMarr) is an African American man who is the landlord of the apartment building where the Casagrandes live. Rosa works for him as the building manager.
- Nico (vocal effects provided by Dee Bradley Baker) is a night monkey living at the Great Lakes City Zoo. At different points, Nico can be seen in the Chang family's apartment when not at the Great Lakes City Zoo.
- Par (voiced by Sunil Malhotra) is a produce delivery boy who delivers produce to the Casagrande Mercado. In "The Never-Friending Story", it is revealed that Par is a thrill-seeker at the time when Bobby makes friends with him due to the fact that they use the same hair cream and have long-distance girlfriends with him having a girlfriend named Dori who lives in New York. In "Mexican Makeover", it is revealed that Par can perform heavy metal music. In "Karate Chops", it is revealed that Par runs a karate dojo as its sensei as he works to get more people to take his karate classes. In "Spin Off", it is revealed that Par used to be a sign spinner. In "The Bros in the Band", it is revealed that Par is part of a punk rock band called The GLC Chupacabras.
- The Pizza Chef (voiced by Sean Kenin) is an unnamed pizza chef that runs the abruptly-named Pizza Restaurant in Great Lakes City. He was just called "Pizza Chef" in "Spin Off" when he lost to C.J. in the Great Lakes City Sign-Spinning Competition while representing his restaurant.
- Reizouko (voiced by Andrew Kishino) is a sumo wrestler residing in Great Lakes City.
- Romeo (voiced by Wilson Cruz) is the proprietor of the Great Lakes City art gallery called The Art Space.
- Sancho (vocal effects provided by Sunil Malhotra) is a deformed pigeon in Great Lakes City with one foot who likes to throw pigeon parties and is also Sergio's best friend.
- Street Cats (various vocal effects provided by Eric Bauza and Sean Kenin) are a clowder of black cats that reside in Great Lakes City. They often terrorize the Casagrandes and Lalo is even terrified of them.
- Vito Filliponio (voiced by Carlos Alazraqui) is an elderly Italian American man who is a regular customer at the Casagrande Mercado. He often shares some gossip with Hector. The episode "New Roomie" reveals that Vito is an expert at making meatballs and can do opera singing in his sleep. In "The Oddfather", Vito becomes Carlitos' godfather.
  - Big Tony and Little Sal (vocal effects provided by Sean Kenin) are Vito's two pet dachshunds. Big Tony wears a gray hat and often chases squirrels while Little Sal wears a beige hat and thinks he's a cat.

== Other recurring characters ==
This section lists other recurring characters in The Loud House and/or The Casagrandes:

- 12 is Midnight is a K-pop group that Ronnie Anne and Sid like.
  - Yoon Kwan (voiced by Eric Nam in 2019 of The Loud House, Justin Chon in 2020–present in The Casagrandes) is the lead singer of 12 is Midnight.
  - Wo Yeon (voiced by Daisuke Tsuji) – Member of 12 is Midnight.
  - Jin (voiced by Will Choi) – Member of 12 is Midnight.
  - Jun-Soo (voiced by Isaiah Kim) – Member of 12 is Midnight.
  - Han (voiced by Will Choi) – Member of 12 is Midnight.
- Coach Niblick (voiced by Daran Norris) is a top golf coach at Fairway University.
- Ernesto Estrella (voiced by George Lopez) is a fortune-telling psychic man who hosts a TV show that Rosa loves to watch. He is based on the late Walter Mercado, who died a week before Ernesto's introduction episode "The Horror-Scope" aired, according to the franchise's writer Lalo Alcaraz on Twitter.
- Guy Grazer (voiced by James Arnold Taylor) is a bullying celebrity chef.
- Hunter Spector (voiced by Brian Stepanek) is a ghost hunter who is the host of the TV show ARGGH! (short for Academy of Really Good Ghost Hunters), which Lincoln and Clyde watch.
- Mick Swagger (voiced by Jeff Bennett) is a rock star who is Luna's idol and is also liked by her friends. Luna closely follows his words because she became passionate about music when she was young by attending one of his concerts. In later episodes, Mick appears in Luna's imagination, often giving her advice on certain things. In "Europe Road Trip: A Knight to Remember", Mick is knighted by the King of England.
- R.U. "Rip" Hardcore (voiced by Bert Kreischer in "Mall of Duty", Andrew Morgado in A Loud House Christmas Movie: Naughty or Nice and "Birthday Stiffed") is a known survival expert that Lincoln and Clyde are fans of. The live-action projects featured different versions of Rip Hardcore.
  - The version of Rip Hardcore (portrayed by Brian Patrick Wade) that appeared in A Loud House Christmas sported a mohawk.
  - The Really Loud House reveals that the network that shows Rip Hardcore's TV show holds the trademark Rip Hardcore name. The younger Rip Hardcore (portrayed by Miles Burris) shown in this show that was accidentally fired by a corn dog-induced hawk incident caused by Lincoln and Clyde had the real name of Stanley Bunch. Stanley was succeeded by an African-American man named Travis (portrayed by Stevie Baggs).
- Tippy the Cow (voiced by Alani Ilongwe in most episodes, Nika Futterman in "Force of Habits") is the mascot of Dairyland Amoosement Park.

== The Really Loud House characters ==
This section lists characters who exclusively appeared in The Really Loud House:

- Charlie Uggo (portrayed by Bella Blanding) is an African-American girl and temporary exchange student at Royal Woods Middle School who moved from Tennessee after her father lost his job due to a factory fire. Her last name "Uggo" is of French origin. She at first likes Rusty, but becomes Lincoln's girlfriend after breaking up with Rusty sometime prior to the episode "I Wanna Hold Your Hand". In the episode "The Princess and the Everlasting Emerald: A Royal Woods Fairytale: Part 2", she moves back to Tennessee, but remains in a relationship with Lincoln as seen in "All Fair in Love and Sleepovers". Though by "The Tennessee Surprise: Love Is in the Air", Charlie falls for another boy causing her and Lincoln to end their romantic relationship.
- Zia (portrayed by Sanjana Rajagopalan) is an Indian-American girl who is a friend of Lynn where she sports the same athletic traits. She becomes Lincoln's love interest and later girlfriend in the second season of The Really Loud House.

== Film-exclusive characters ==
This section lists characters who exclusively appeared in the films:

Appearing in The Loud House Movie

- Angus (voiced by David Tennant) is the former groundskeeper of the Loud castle, co-worker of Morag, and current Duke of Loch Loud. In the Loud family's absence, he helped the citizens of Loch Loud with their difficult situations. Angus later prepared Lincoln to become the Duke upon him expressing interest in restoring the family's regal status. Following Morag's defeat, Lincoln makes Angus the new Duke of Loch Loud which the ghosts of the Loud family's ancestors approve of. During the credits, Angus can be seen rescuing Morag from the island that Lela dropped her on.
- Morag (voiced by Michelle Gomez) is the former property caretaker, co-worker of Angus, and current groundskeeper of the Loud castle who is the main antagonist of The Loud House Movie. Fond of peace and quiet, she possesses a hatred for the Loud family inherited from her ancestor Aggie (Note: Aggie is voiced by Katy Townsend.) who drove the royal family out of Loch Loud by controlling the Duke's dragon Lolo with a stone, effectively leaving the town in anarchy. Exploiting Lincoln's weakness of desiring to be in the spotlight, coupled with use of the dragon-controlling stone, she successfully drove the Loud family out of Loch Loud before usurping the throne and sending all of the town's citizens into exile. She later became dethroned when the Loud family returned to save the town from destruction. Lela dropped her on a small island inhabited by noisy seals. During the credits, Morag was rescued from the island by Angus where she became promoted to groundskeeper and forced to live alongside the Loud family's ancestors in their ghost forms as Lela keeps her in line.
- Lela (vocal effects provided by Jan Johns) is a dragon that serves as the current protector of Loch Loud and the only descendant of the previous dragon Lolo. (Note: Lolo's vocal effects are likewise provided by Jan Johns.) She has the authority to determine those destined to hold the throne's power and is responsible for keeping society in order. Under the influence of the dragon-controlling stone, she becomes evil and loses regard of her responsibility. The Loud family and Lucille broke Lela from the control and she dropped Morag off on an island inhabited by noisy seals. During the credits, Lela has laid more eggs and is keeping Morag in line.
- Scott (voiced by Billy Boyd) is a citizen of Loch Loud whom Leni develops a crush on. He is mentioned to have a 1600s ancestor that the 1600s ancestor of Leni knows.

Appearing in A Really Haunted Loud House

- Xander Coddington (portrayed by Martin Fajardo) is a new and popular student at Royal Woods Middle School and social media influencer who is the main antagonist of A Really Haunted Loud House. He hates increases to strictness about dental care in society. Lincoln and Clyde were invited to his Halloween party after Lincoln impressed him at the dentist's office. After getting news about the Louds handing out toothbrushes, he leads a mob of his party guests to the house to share his opinion with the public, not realizing that Lincoln lives there until the showdown at Mount Crushmore where he had stolen Lisa's giant pumpkin.
- Paul Coddington (portrayed by Anthony Hord) is the older brother of Xander who works in the Mount Crushmore junkyard and supports his younger brother to the point where he assists Xander in abducting Lisa's giant pumpkin.
- Jenna (portrayed by Summer Schaeffer) is a girl who is part of Xander's gang of friends. She accompanies Xander in his actions against the Loud family.

Appearing in The Casagrandes Movie

- Punguari (voiced by Paulina Chávez) is a rebellious preteen demigodess with the power to shapeshift who wishes to do whatever she wants. Initially petrified over 800 years ago after inadvertently awakening Ucumu, she awakens in the present day and briefly takes a human form Shara. Punguari later manipulates Ronnie Anne into allowing her to take a mask that would allow her to harness the powers of a demigod, but after she finds out that her parents petrified her after Ucumu's awakening to protect her (initially thinking they petrified her as a simple punishment), she works together with Ronnie Anne and her family to vanquish the threat.
- Sisiki (voiced by Kate del Castillo) is the mother of Punguari who wishes the best for her daughter. She is a Chancla Warrior and the Goddess of Nature in this franchise. Some time before the events of the movie, she and her husband Chipiri were turned into gems that were worn by Ucumu.
- Chipiri (voiced by Cristo Fernández) is the father of Punguari and the God of the Sun in this franchise. Sometime before the events of the movie, Chipiri and his wife Sisiki were turned into gems worn by Ucumu.
- Ucumu is the God of the Mexican Underworld in this franchise and the main antagonist of The Casagrandes Movie who is awakened by Punguari twice. He takes a towering form and has numerous abilities including summoning minions to attack enemies on the ground.
- Don Tacho (voiced by Carlos Alazraqui) is the manager of Lupe's hacienda who is very strict. He is in charge of piloting the boat and airplane while traveling to and from the hacienda and the town of Japunda.

Appearing in No Time to Spy

- Dr. Rufus Dufus (voiced by Dan Fogler) is a mad scientist with dwarfism who was an old enemy of Myrtle and whose last name is pronounced "Du-fu" because of its French pronunciation. During his last fight with her, Dr. Dufus slipped on some spilled coffee and fell into a rocket that was sent into outer space.
- Fifi Dufus (voiced by Amy Sedaris) is the wife of Rufus and the main antagonist of the film. After Rufus was accidentally launched into outer space, Fifi took over her husband's organization and planned revenge on Myrtle. After her revenge plot was thwarted, Fifi was revealed to have been arrested by "Police Chief Philipini".
  - Ham Hand (voiced by Paul Wight) is the lead henchman of Rufus and Fifi Dufus who orders around their minions when neither of them are present. He was a former professional wrestler whose left hand was badly broken in his last wrestling match and was outfitted with a hammer-headed prosthetic as a replacement by Dr. Dufus. Ham Hand was defeated by Myrtle during her mission to stop Dr. Dufus' plot. Years later, Ham Hand worked with Dr. Dufus' wife Fifi in her revenge plot against Myrtle. He was defeated again by Myrtle. By the end of the film, Ham Hand and Fifi were shown to have been arrested by "Police Chief Philipini". It is also revealed during this time that he always cries at weddings.
  - Jerry (voiced by Brian Stepanek) is one of Dufus' henchmen who can be distinguished by his attire of cargo shorts. He is the first of the henchmen to encounter Lincoln and Myrtle and he has his cargo shorts pulled off by a fishing hook at the end of their battle. The cargo shorts were later salvaged by Fifi.
  - Mo (voiced by John DiMaggio) is one of Dufus' henchmen who sports a yellow mohawk and a scar on his left eye.
- X (voiced by Sarah Niles) is Myrtle's old boss during her spy days and a member of Interspy. She walked her through her mission to thwart Dr. Rufus Dufus. After Dr. Dufus slipped on some coffee and fell into a rocket that was shot into outer space, X stated to Myrtle that there is nothing they can do to avert it. Years later, X was contacted by Myrtle about Dr. Dufus' possible return. Lincoln secretly texted X tha Myrtle will take care of it. X was later seen at Albert and Myrtle's wedding where she was among the women accidentally tackled by Lori when she was trying to catch the bouquet. X "complimented" Lori's catch and advised her never to tackle her again or else she'll make Bobby disappear and make it look like an accident. Though it can be implied that she is only kidding. X later appeared in the main series' episode "Europe Road Trip: A Knight to Remember" where Lincoln runs into her during her investigation of the abductions happening at the time when Mick Swagger was scheduled to be knighted. When Mick Swagger was rescued from the Earl of Nuttingham by the Loud family, Interspy arrested the Earl of Nuttingham as X tells Lincoln that he would be a good candidate for the Interspy Academy when he is older.
- Flop Philipini (voiced by John DiMaggio) is the identical cousin of Flip who is the hotel manager of the Thunderball Resort in the unidentified tropical location of Albert and Myrtle's wedding. Like his cousin, Flop is also shown to be smug. Though he does have a strong sense of sincerity. In addition, Flop also does side businesses like running a limousine business called Louie's Limousines and Lemonade which also serves lemonade to the passengers, a wedding and funeral service called "Willie's Weddings and Wakes", and has also operated as the unidentified tropical location's chief of police where Flop has also passed off his aliases as his associates.
  - Ceviche is Flop's crab companion.
- Owen (voiced by Chester Rushing) is a bellhop at the Thunderball Resort who Myrtle pays to pose as her while she goes after Lincoln. Rita, Todd, and the Loud sisters were fooled by this disguise when they took her out for a bachelor party. This lasted until Lincoln informed his family what happened and Owen admitted to being paid to pose as Myrtle as he soon got caught up in the moment.

Appearing in A Loud House Christmas Movie: Naughty or Nice

- Duncan (voiced by Harvey Guillén) is a popular and elite Christmas elf who invented the Technical Integrated Naughty/Nice Santa List (or T.I.N.N.S.L. for short). He was sent to Royal Woods by Santa Claus to determine if Lincoln, a "flipper", is worthy of being on the Naughty List or the Nice List. When caught by Lincoln and Clyde, this ends up causing Duncan to put him on the Naughty List while also bringing up his naughty explots. Due to being in one of the buildings that had ice cream in it, Duncan was unaffected when Lincoln hacked into T.I.N.N.S.L. and worked with the Loud Family to restore the North Pole that involves bringing Christmas magic to the base of Mount Christmas. Once that was done though a combination of Lincoln's sacrifice and Duncan's tears, Santa gives everyone a Christmas Day re-do. Pleased with the outcomes, Duncan works on the next plans for T.I.N.N.S.L. that involves upgrading it.
- Gerald (voiced by Chris Parnell) is a Christmas elf and Duncan's co-worker in the T.I.N.N.S.L Department. There was a reference where he accidentally got crumbs in T.I.N.N.S.L.'s keyboards that one time.
- Santa Claus (voiced by Piotr Michael) is a legendary figure of Christmas who was mentioned a lot in this franchise. He shows up in person in A Loud House Christmas: Naughty or Nice where he sends his top Christmas elf Duncan to investigate the "flipper" Lincoln Loud. When Lincoln hacks into T.I.N.N.S.L. using Duncan's misplaced Gingerpad, this makes everything in the North Pole naughty and transforms Santa into the film's main antagonist, Naughty Santa. Hearing that Lincoln was behind the hack, Naughty Santa plans to make use of Lincoln only to outwit him. As Lincoln and Duncan head to Mount Christmas, Naughty Santa bakes a special reindeer gingerbread cookie that turns anyone hit by its beams into gingerbread men. After Lincoln was hit by the beam at the top of Mount Christmas when protecting Duncan, this sacrifice combined with Duncan's tears undoes the changes to the North Pole that restores Santa back to normal. Afterwards, Santa puts Lincoln on the Nice List and does a Christmas Day re-do with only Lincoln remembering what had happened. Pleased with the outcome, Santa is told by Duncan that he is going to work on the next plans for T.I.N.N.S.L.
- Travis (voiced by Vargus Mason) is a Christmas elf and Duncan's co-worker in the T.I.N.N.S.L. Department.
