= No Time to Spy =

2024 American animated film directed by Kyle Marshall

- Promotional release poster
- Genre: Spy; Comedy
- Based on: Characters by Chris Savino
- Written by: Whitney Wetta; Jeff Sayers
- Directed by: Kyle Marshall
- Starring: Bentley Griffin; Piotr Michael; Alex Cazares; Jill Talley; Brian Stepanek; Catherine Taber; Liliana Mumy; Nika Futterman; Cristina Pucelli; Jessica DiCicco; Grey DeLisle; Lara Jill Miller; Amy Sedaris; Paul Wight; Sarah Niles; Dan Fogler
- Music by: Jonathan Hylander
- Country of origin: United States
- Original language: English

Production
- Executive producer: Michael Rubiner
- Editor: Tony Molina
- Running time: 81 minutes
- Production company: Nickelodeon Movies (Note: Animation outsourced to Jam Filled Entertainment.)

Original release
- Network: Paramount+; Nickelodeon
- Release: June 21, 2024

Related
- The Loud House Movie (2021); A Loud House Christmas Movie: Naughty or Nice (2025)

No Time to Spy: A Loud House Movie (titled onscreen as simply No Time to Spy) is a 2024 American animated spy comedy film based on the television series The Loud House. The film was directed by series veteran Kyle Marshall and stars the show's regular voice cast alongside the voices of Amy Sedaris, Paul Wight, Sarah Niles, and Dan Fogler. The story follows the Loud family as they go to a tropical wedding celebration and get entangled in a super spy plot. It is the third animated film in The Loud House franchise following The Loud House Movie (2021) and The Casagrandes Movie (2024), and the fifth overall.

Whitney Wetta and Jeffrey Sayers wrote the screenplay. The series' writers room envisioned a Loud House spy story during production of the sixth season, but no plans were made until Nickelodeon said that they wanted to do another film based on the series. The film was produced by Nickelodeon Movies and animated by Jam Filled Entertainment. Jonathan Hylander composed the score.

No Time to Spy: A Loud House Movie was released on Paramount+ on June 21, 2024 and was followed by a premiere on Nickelodeon later the same day.

== Plot ==
Lincoln Loud is excited to celebrate his Gran-Gran Myrtle's marriage with his grandfather, Albert. (Note: Myrtle's engagement with Albert is a plot point of the sixth season episode "Pop Pop the Question".) Knowing of, and fascinated by, Myrtle's past life as Agent 28, a secret agent who defeated a supervillain named Dr. Rufus Dufus in her youth, Lincoln insists on bringing his David Steele spy equipment, despite Myrtle wanting to focus on the wedding. She entrusts Lincoln to protect her wedding rings, though he treats it like a spy mission.

The Louds head to a tropical island to celebrate the wedding; on the flight, Lincoln meets Fifi, a woman annoyed by his family's antics. The family reaches the Thunderball Resort, run by Flip's cousin Flop Phillipini. Later that day, Lincoln witnesses suspicious activity while on a fishing trip with Myrtle and Albert. He attempts to take photos, but is ambushed by henchmen. Myrtle is able to fight them off, but she loses Lincoln's camera in the process. Returning to shore, Myrtle tells Lincoln to not be involved in any more missions, and that they would be leaving the island, out of concern for her step-grandson's safety. However, Lincoln insists on going anyway, telling Myrtle's superior, X, that they would undertake the mission behind his step-grandmother's back. Shortly afterward, he runs into Fifi again, who gives him his camera.

As night falls, Lincoln and his friend Clyde trace more suspicious activity to a restaurant called Rubiner's. Seeing Lincoln sneak away, Myrtle ropes a bellhop named Owen into masquerading as her and partaking in family activities while she follows her step-grandson to Rubiner's. While there, Lincoln manages to overhear some henchmen planning to send rocket parts to Dufus, but is interrupted by Fifi and eventually Myrtle, to whom he confesses that he accepted the mission on her behalf. The two are spotted; they manage to defeat more henchmen together and escape from the restaurant, but Dufus' old henchman Ham Hand captures Myrtle while Lincoln escapes.

On the run from Dufus' henchmen, Lincoln is saved by his family, who find out the local police station is also run by Flop. A determined Lincoln rallies his family into helping him save Myrtle; the next day, Lisa, having prepared in advance, gives her family spy gadgets. Inspired by a David Steele comic, Lincoln deduces that Dufus' base is in a nearby mountain. Fifi, appearing in a rental buggy, accidentally gives away their location, and the Louds are forced to lose their pursuers by the beachfront.

Reaching the secret base, the Louds sneak in and split up to cover more ground. Myrtle is able to escape her cell and reach the rocket platform while her family finds her cell, which they are locked in. Myrtle fights Ham Hand while the jail cell containing the other Louds is raised up and connected to the rocket, distracting her long enough for her to be held captive by Ham Hand. Fifi reveals herself to be the mastermind - and Dufus' wife - having used Lincoln as bait to lure the Louds into her trap with the intention of launching them all into space.

With the rocket about to launch, Myrtle is able to defeat Ham Hand, but Fifi, having gained possession of the wedding rings Lincoln was meant to protect, drops them into the ocean. An enraged Myrtle is unable to defeat Fifi as the rocket launches into the sky. A heartbroken Lincoln takes responsibility for leading them into Fifi's trap. Myrtle points out that they can all use the rocket's septic tank as an escape pod, but the tank would need to be closed from outside. Lincoln takes initiative, staying behind - much to the others' horror - while the others are launched back to the ground.

The other Louds are heartbroken about Lincoln's sacrifice. After reading one of Lincoln's David Steele comics, Myrtle has the family return to the rocket console to establish a connection with Lisa's nuclear fusion laser, which strikes a satellite and hits Lincoln's rocket, causing it to blast back to Earth and into the nearby sea. Albert swims down to the rocket, which is already breached with water, and frees Lincoln.

Albert brings Lincoln back to shore, to the others' relief, and the family shares a group hug. Myrtle and Albert reconcile, announcing that the wedding will go on. Lincoln brings Myrtle replacement bamboo wedding rings, having sold his spy watch. With Fifi and Ham Hand arrested, Flop officiates the wedding, and later that night, the Louds party on.

== Voice cast ==
- Bentley Griffin as Lincoln
- Alex Cazares as Myrtle
- Piotr Michael as:
  - Albert (Note: Listed as "Pop Pop" in the credits.)
  - Boat Henchman
  - Karaoke Patron
- Brian Stepanek as:
  - Lynn Sr. (Note: Listed as "Dad" in the credits.)
  - Todd
  - Cargo Shorts Henchman
- Amy Sedaris as Fifi Dufus
- Jessica DiCicco as:
  - Lynn
  - Lucy
- Lara Jill Miller as Lisa
- Jill Talley as:
  - Rita (Note: Listed as "Mom" in the credits.)
  - Computer Voice
- John DiMaggio as:
  - Mr. Grouse
  - Flop
  - Henchman Mo
- Grey DeLisle as:
  - Lola
  - Lana
  - Lily
- Paul Wight as Ham Hand
- Catherine Taber as Lori
- Chester Rushing as:
  - Owen
  - Guard #1
- Jaeden White as Clyde
- Sarah Niles as X
- Nika Futterman as Luna
- Dan Fogler as Rufus Dufus (Note: Listed as "Dr. Dufus" in the credits.)
- Cristina Pucelli as Luan
- Liliana Mumy as Leni
- Khary Payton as Harold

Additional voices by Griffen Campbell, Ryan W. Garcia, Jake Green, J. P. Karliak, Keston John, Sunil Malhotra, Kamali Minter, Arnie Pantoja, Isaac Robinson-Smith, Alejandro Saab, Carla Tassara, Fred Tatasciore, and Trisha Vo.

== Production ==
=== Announcement ===
In late April 2024, Nickelodeon released a teaser promo for a new animated film based on The Loud House, titled No Time to Spy: A Loud House Movie. In late May 2024, further details on the film were disclosed including the cast, crew, and release date. Series regulars Bentley Griffin, Alex Cazares, Piotr Michael, Jill Talley, Brian Stepanek, Catherine Taber, Liliana Mumy, Nika Futterman, Cristina Pucelli, Jessica DiCicco, Grey DeLisle, and Lara Jill Miller lead the voice cast. The film was directed by series supervising director and co-executive producer Kyle Marshall, and written by Whitney Wetta and Jeffrey Sayers. The film is produced by Nickelodeon Animation Studio, and Jam Filled Entertainment provided animation. Michael Rubiner, who is an executive producer on the series, also executive produced the film.

=== Development ===
The basis for the film's story was set up in the season 6 episode "Pop Pop the Question". The idea bounced back and forth in the writers room, but no plans were made until Nickelodeon said that they wanted to do another film based on the series. The writers knew they wanted the story to center around a destination wedding between Pop Pop and Myrtle. This, in tandem with Myrtle's spy background that they set up in the series, led to them making a spy genre film. In the series, they had introduced the character David Steele as Lincoln's new fan sensation, so they felt making a spy film felt natural. The crew were inspired by several James Bond films during production, and tried to reflect the pacing and structure of them. The villain Ham Hand was inspired by Jaws who first appeared in The Spy Who Loved Me (1977).

In regards to the out-there nature of the film in comparison to the early days of the series, Marshall made a comparison to the long-running animated sitcom The Simpsons and said, "It's kind of natural that we start to find some fresh territory to mine that we haven't done before". He added, "But all the while, I would say that no matter how we expand the world or how crazy it gets, we do try to always have some kind of grounded character story that lies beneath it that's still kid-related." To balance the film's large ensemble of characters, the filmmakers had them all ultimately work towards the same goal, regardless of side plots that had been set up.

=== Music ===
No Time to Spy: A Loud House Movie (Official Soundtrack)

Soundtrack album
- Released: June 21, 2024
- Genre: Soundtrack
- Length: 45:19
- Label: Republic Records Kids & Family

Jonathan Hylander took heavy influence from John Barry's work in Thunderball (1965) when composing the film's score. Hylander also wrote the opening song in the film, after which Marshall and head of story, Ari Castleton, told board artist Toby Parry the direction they wanted for the opening visual sequence that it was paired with. David Vasquez edited the first cut, and Tony Molina, lead picture editor, finished it off. For the sequence, Jam Filled tried to push the look and movement of the characters in a more cinematic direction, while still fitting the tone of the series. A soundtrack album was released by Republic Records Kids & Family label on June 21, 2024, the same day as the film.

Track listing

No.	Title	Writer(s)	Performer(s)	Length
1.	"No Time To Spy"	Jonathan Hylander	The Loud House	00:40
2.	"The Plane Case"	Jonathan Hylander	Jonathan Hylander; The Loud House	02:15
3.	"Dufus' Layer"	Jonathan Hylander	Jonathan Hylander; The Loud House	02:59
4.	"Around The Loud House"	Jonathan Hylander	Jonathan Hylander; The Loud House	01:23
5.	"One Little Palm Tree"	Jonathan Hylander	Jonathan Hylander; The Loud House	01:40
6.	"Myrtle Refuses the Call"	Jonathan Hylander	Jonathan Hylander; The Loud House	02:02
7.	"Oooh Girl (If I Could)"	Jonathan Hylander	Jonathan Hylander; The Loud House	00:41
8.	"Rubiner's"	Jonathan Hylander	Jonathan Hylander; The Loud House	01:52
9.	"Cafe Fight"	Jonathan Hylander	Jonathan Hylander; The Loud House	01:20
10.	"Moped Chase"	Jonathan Hylander	Jonathan Hylander; The Loud House	02:15
11.	"Ham Hands"	Jonathan Hylander	Jonathan Hylander; The Loud House	01:04
12.	"What Would David Steele Do"	Jonathan Hylander	Jonathan Hylander; The Loud House	01:28
13.	"The Right Equipment"	Jonathan Hylander	Jonathan Hylander; The Loud House	01:28
14.	"Dune Buggy Chase"	Jonathan Hylander	Jonathan Hylander; The Loud House	02:48
15.	"Caught on a Catwalk"	Jonathan Hylander	Jonathan Hylander; The Loud House	01:34
16.	"Myrtle Rights Ham Hand"	Jonathan Hylander	Jonathan Hylander; The Loud House	02:28
17.	"Fifi's Reveal"	Jonathan Hylander	Jonathan Hylander; The Loud House	02:41
18.	"Fifi's Revenge"	Jonathan Hylander	Jonathan Hylander; The Loud House	03:14
19.	"All My Fault"	Jonathan Hylander	Jonathan Hylander; The Loud House	03:15
20.	"Back to Earth"	Jonathan Hylander	Jonathan Hylander; The Loud House	02:28
21.	"Lincoln's Safe (quotes "The Loud House Theme Song" by Doug Rockwell and Michelle Lewis)"	Jonathan Hylander	Jonathan Hylander; The Loud House	01:23
22.	"What A Hero Is"	Jonathan Hylander	Jonathan Hylander; The Loud House	00:51
23.	"Island Weedding"	Jonathan Hylander	Jonathan Hylander; The Loud House	00:36
24.	"Loud House Family"	Demitri Lerios; Hope Bartimioli Thal	The Loud House	02:48
Total length:				45:19

== Release ==
No Time to Spy: A Loud House Movie was released on Paramount+ on June 21, 2024, and was followed by a premiere on Nickelodeon later the same day.

== Reception ==
=== Ratings ===
On its Nickelodeon premiere, the film received 179,000 viewers, earning a 0.06 P2+ rating. In the 18–49 age demographic, it received 79,500 viewers, and another 0.06 rating.

=== Critical reception ===
Fernanda Camargo of Common Sense Media gave the film a 3 out of 5 star rating, and called it "a fun but flawed addition to the series, best enjoyed by those already familiar with the Loud family's tricks". David Kaldor of Bubbleblabber gave the film a 7 out of 10 rating. He commended it for its accessibility to new viewers and said, "Overall, it's just a fun time for everyone and a fine enough way to spent [sic] seventy five to ninety minutes."

=== Accolades ===
Year	Award	Category	Nominee(s)	Result	Ref.
2025	Kidscreen Awards	Best One-Off, Special or TV Movie - Kids	No Time to Spy: A Loud House Movie	Nominated	

== Sequel ==
The sequel, A Loud House Christmas Movie: Naughty or Nice, was released on November 21, 2025 in the U.S. on Nickelodeon.
