= Tide Lines =

Scottish folk music group

- Origin: Scottish Highlands and Islands
- Genres: Folk pop
- Years active: 2016–present
- Members: Robert Robertson; Ross Wilson; Alasdair Turner; Fergus Munro
- Website: www.tidelinesband.com

Tide Lines are a four-piece folk pop band from the Highlands of Scotland. Cited in 2023 as one of the leading folk rock groups in Scotland, their musical style has been described as "anthemic, indie-folk".

== History ==
The band's first studio album Dreams We Never Lost was released in June 2017 following the release of their first single Far Side Of The World some months earlier. The album is a mix of English and Gaelic songs as well as the Piob Mhor Pipe set. Two further singles Fortunes of the Fearless and The Young and The Restless were also released as singles from this album.

In October 2018 the band released a six track EP entitled Lets Make Tonight. Two singles, Heroes and Running at the Dark were released prior to the EP. Heroes won Video of the Year at the 2018 Na Trad Awards. The EP also contained a live version of Far Side of the World recorded at the HebCelt Music Festival in 2018. In November, the band sold out the Scottish music venue Barrowland in Glasgow.

Their second album, Eye of the Storm, was released in May 2020 and debuted at #12 in the Official UK Album Charts. Eye of the Storm also topped both the Scottish and independent album charts on the week of its release.

In December 2020, the band issued a small scale release through their own website called the Lockdown Mix Tape consisting of three cover songs and the song This Christmas Time which was re-released as a single in 2022 as a duet with musician NatiDreddd. They performed the song "My Way Back Home", written by Christopher Lennertz and Philip White, which was included on the soundtrack album of the Netflix film The Loud House Movie (2021).

Rivers in the Light was released in July 2022 as new material from the planned third studio album, again self-produced and recorded at the group's own studio. Written in the Scars was released in September 2022.

In March 2023, the band released their third studio album An Ocean Full of Islands and announced a tour of the United Kingdom and Ireland.

Their fourth studio album Glasgow Love Story was released on the 25th of April 2025, and followed up with a tour later in 2025 to venues in Scotland and England, with Rose Betts as a supporting act.

== Members ==
- Robert Robertson – vocals and guitar
- Alasdair Turner – electric guitar and bagpipes
- Ross Wilson – keyboard
- Fergus Munro – drums

== Discography ==
Albums

- Dreams We Never Lost (2017)
- Eye of the Storm (2020)
- An Ocean Full of Islands (2023)
- Glasgow Love Story (2025)

EPs

- Let's Make Tonight EP (2018)
- Lockdown Mixtape (2020)
- Elements Limited Edition EP (2023)

Singles and songs

- "Far Side of the World" (2016)
- "The Young and the Restless" (2017)
- "Fortunes of the Fearless" (2017)
- "Streets of Dreamers" (2018)
- "Let's Make Tonight" (2018)
- "Running at the Dark" (2019)
- "Heroes" (2019)
- "Shadow to the Light" (2020)
- "Innocent and Beautiful" (2020)
- "Eye of the Storm" (2021)
- "Rivers in the Light" (2022)
- "Written in the Scars" (2022)
- "These Days" (2023)
- "Hardly Surprising" (2023)
- "Homeward Bound" (2024)
- "Cherry Blossom Sunset" (2024)
