= Cristina Pucelli =

American voice actress

- Born: June 11, 1969 (age 57); Orange County, California, U.S.
- Occupation: Voice actress
- Years active: 1997–present
- Website: cristinapucelli.com

Cristina Pucelli (/puːˈtʃɛliː/, born June 11, 1969) is an American voice actress. She is best known for her voices in animated series and video games, including Joe's girlfriend, Silvia, in the Viewtiful Joe game, Luan Loud on Nickelodeon's television series The Loud House and Shadow on Nick Jr's television series Baby Shark's Big Show!.

== Early life and education ==
Pucelli was born to a family of second-generation Italian immigrants. She studied voice-over under the guidance of Ginny McSwain, Bob Bergen, Louise Chamis and Mary Lynn Wissner.

== Career ==
Her most-known role was that of Joe's girlfriend, Silvia, in the Viewtiful Joe games. She then went on to do voice work in Xenosaga Episode II and Xenosaga Episode III as MOMO and in Psychonauts, as Elton Fir. She also voiced Patrick on the television series Allen Gregory. In video games, she voiced Luka in Lost Planet: Extreme Condition, Sunny in Metal Gear Solid 4: Guns of the Patriots and Metal Gear Rising: Revengeance. She also voices Luan Loud on Nickelodeon's television series The Loud House and Shadow on Nick Jr's television series Baby Shark's Big Show!. In radio, she voices the character of Emily Jones in Adventures in Odyssey.

== Filmography ==
=== Film ===
| Year | Title | Role | Notes |
|---|---|---|---|
| 2005 | Leo the Lion | Nanou, Baby Monkey #2 | Direct-to-video |
| 2010 | Santa's Apprentice | Felix | |
| 2011 | Small Fry | Additional voices | Short |
| 2013 | Monsters University | Additional voices | |
| 2013 | Scooby-Doo! Stage Fright | Colette | Direct-to-video |
| 2014 | Party Central | Timmy | Short |
| 2014 | Yellowbird | Young Yellowbird | |
| 2014 | Ava & Lala | Additional voices | |
| 2016 | The Guardian Brothers | Bloom | |
| 2016 | DC Super Hero Girls: Hero of the Year | Miss Martian, Amethyst | |
| 2018 | Lego DC Super Hero Girls: Super-Villain High | Selina Kyle, Catwoman | |
| 2021 | The Loud House Movie | Luan Loud | |
| 2024 | No Time to Spy: A Loud House Movie | Luan Loud | |
| 2025 | A Loud House Christmas Movie: Naughty or Nice | Luan Loud, Child #1 | |

=== Television ===
| Year | Title | Role | Notes |
|---|---|---|---|
| 2004 | As Told by Ginger | Vanessa | Episode: "Heat Lightning" |
| 2007 | All Grown Up! | Anita | Episode: "All Broke Up" |
| 2007 | Finley the Fire Engine | DJ, Jesse, Polly | 1 episode |
| 2011 | Allen Gregory | Patrick Vanderweel | 7 episodes |
| 2013 | The Haunted Hathaways | Clamby | Episode: "Haunted Dog" |
| 2014 | The Boondocks | Various voices | 3 episodes |
| 2014 | We Wish You a Merry Walrus | Lorna | Television special |
| 2014–2017 | Doc McStuffins | Hazel | 4 episodes |
| 2015 | Uncle Grandpa | Phillip's Mom, Kim, additional voices | 2 episodes |
| 2015 | Club Penguin: Monster Beach Party | Lorna | Television special |
| 2015–2018 | DC Super Hero Girls | Miss Martian, Catwoman, Star Sapphire Ring | 21 episodes |
| 2016–present | The Loud House | Luan Loud, Mr. Coconuts, Dante, Burnt Bean Manager, additional voices | 96 episodes |
| 2016–2017 | Adam Ruins Everything | Lady Green Giant, Spoiled Milk, Barbie 1 | 3 episodes |
| 2017 | Be Cool, Scooby-Doo! | Newscaster | Episode: "Vote Velma" |
| 2017 | The Tom and Jerry Show | Matilda | Episode: "Stolen Heart" |
| 2018 | Spy Kids: Mission Critical | A. Hwang, Computer | Episode: "Mission Critical" |
| 2019–2022 | The Casagrandes | Miranda, Luan Loud, Subway Baby | 5 episodes |
| 2021 | Adventures in Odyssey | Emily Jones | Episode: "Let's Call the Whole Thing Off" |
| 2021 | Baby Shark's Big Show! | Shadow, Minnow, Audience | 4 episodes |
| 2024 | Kite Man: Hell Yeah! | Luthor-A/Kenneth | Episode: "Grand Reopening, Hell Yeah!" |

=== Video games ===
| Year | Title | Voice role | Notes |
|---|---|---|---|
| 2003 | Viewtiful Joe | Silvia | |
| 2004 | Xenosaga Episode II | MOMO Mizrahi | |
| 2004 | Viewtiful Joe 2 | Silvia | |
| 2005 | Psychonauts | Elton Fir | |
| 2005 | Viewtiful Joe: Red Hot Rumble | Silvia | |
| 2006 | Tokobot Plus: Mysteries of the Karakuri | Bolt | |
| 2006 | Lost Planet: Extreme Condition | Luka | |
| 2006 | Xenosaga Episode III | MOMO Mizrahi | |
| 2007 | Hannah Montana: Spotlight World Tour | Cairo Shopkeeper | |
| 2008 | Lost Planet: Colonies | Luka | |
| 2008 | Metal Gear Solid 4: Guns of the Patriots | Sunny | |
| 2010 | Mafia II | Civilians | |
| 2010 | Fallout: New Vegas | Additional voices | |
| 2011 | The Sims Medieval | Baby Sim | |
| 2011 | Infamous 2 | Female pedestrians | |
| 2011 | Dungeon Siege III | Radiant Youth, additional voices | |
| 2011 | Ratchet & Clank: All 4 One | Susie Skeebow | |
| 2011 | Kinect: Disneyland Adventures | Shopkeeper | |
| 2013 | Metal Gear Rising: Revengeance | Sunny | |
| 2013 | The Wonderful 101 | Additional voices | |
| 2013 | Lightning Returns: Final Fantasy XIII | Additional voices | |
| 2021 | Cookie Run: Kingdom | Moon Rabbit Cookie | |
| 2021 | Lost Judgment | Minato Todo | |
