= A Loud House Christmas Movie: Naughty or Nice =

2025 American animated television film

- Promotional poster
- Genre: Adventure; Comedy; Christmas films
- Based on: The Loud House by Chris Savino
- Written by: Tony Gama-Lobo; Rebecca May
- Directed by: Darin McGowan
- Starring: Sawyer Cole; Jill Talley; Brian Stepanek; Cristina Pucelli; Jessica DiCicco; Catherine Taber; Nika Futterman; Liliana Mumy; Grey DeLisle; Lara Jill Miller; Jaeden White; Piotr Michael; Harvey Guillén; Chris Parnell
- Composer: Jonathan Hylander
- Country of origin: United States
- Original language: English

Production
- Executive producers: Michael Rubiner; April Lawrence
- Editor: Kendra Juul
- Running time: 81 minutes
- Production company: Nickelodeon Movies

Original release
- Network: Nickelodeon
- Release: November 21, 2025

Related
- The Loud House Movie (2021); A Loud House Christmas (2021); A Really Haunted Loud House (2023); No Time to Spy: A Loud House Movie (2024)

A Loud House Christmas Movie: Naughty or Nice is a 2025 American animated Christmas comedy adventure television film based on The Loud House television series. It is the fourth animated film in the franchise following The Loud House Movie (2021), The Casagrandes Movie (2024), and No Time to Spy (2024), and the sixth overall. The principal voice actors from the TV series reprise their roles and are joined by Piotr Michael, Harvey Guillén, and Chris Parnell. The film was produced by Nickelodeon Movies and animated by Jam Filled Entertainment and Nickelodeon Animation Studio. It premiered on November 21, 2025, on Nickelodeon. The film received mixed reviews.

== Plot ==
Duncan is a Christmas elf who is stationed in Santa Claus' headquarters at the North Pole. One day, he and Santa are alerted to an alarm from the Technical Integrated Naughty/Nice Santa List (T.I.N.N.S.L.) that identifies Lincoln Loud as a "Flipper", someone who flips between naughty and nice, as its final analysis cannot determine if he should be put on the naughty or nice list. Despite his insistence that he is not ready, Duncan is sent to Royal Woods to spy on Lincoln, who wishes for a Rip Hardcore multi-tool.

The Louds and Lincoln's best friend Clyde visit Gingerhausen, where Lincoln realizes that someone is spying on him. He and Clyde chase and catch Duncan - who Lincoln mistakes for an actual elf - who tells him that he is a "Flipper" due to a series of pranks and minor misdeeds he committed throughout the year. While being interrogated by the duo, Duncan adds more infractions to Lincoln's list that eventually pushes him down to the naughty list before escaping and returning to the North Pole.

Now on the naughty list, Lincoln attempts to hack into T.I.N.N.S.L. through a Gingerpad that Duncan left behind. However, his plan backfires and he ends up accidentally reversing the entire world's naughty and nice lists. On Christmas Day, the other Louds get coal while Lincoln manages to get the multi-tool. They then find out that the Christmas wishes of Scoots, Chandler, and Flip has come true. With his family mad at him, Lincoln realizes his mistake as he should be grounded and the potential consequences, and he asks his family to travel to the North Pole on a mission to set things right, to which they forgive him and accept. Meanwhile, the North Pole and Santa himself has turned "naughty" except for Duncan.

Returning to Gingerhausen, the Louds follow Lily's map to a portal which takes them to the North Pole, where they are attacked by corrupted Christmas elves, reindeer, snowmen, holly bushes, nutcracker guards, and evil rabbits. After reuniting with Duncan, the family sneak into Santa's headquarters and manage to swap back the lists, but are confronted by Naughty Santa. Lincoln tries to convince his family he isn't naughty, but Santa shows the family footage of the ramifications that the swap introduced. Lincoln only agrees to cooperate with Santa under the condition that his family is released, but Santa secretly has Gerald take them to the coal mines where Duncan is imprisoned.

Lincoln escapes Santa's office, frees his family from the coal mines, and finds out that the secret ingredient Lynn Sr. obtained earlier is actually a sample of Christmas magic. Lincoln passes some multi-tools he stole from Santa's office to his family as Lincoln and Duncan head for the top of Mount Christmas to pour the vial, while the other Louds use the multi-tools to fight off Santa's minions. However, Naughty Santa soon emerges with a flying reindeer/motorcycle gingerbread cookie which turns anything into gingerbread cookies with its beam.

The Louds follow Santa, who is pursuing Lincoln and Duncan, on a sleigh. After Santa destroys the vial, Lincoln jumps in front of Duncan as Santa fires a beam from his reindeer despite Lily knocking him off, turning himself into a gingerbread cookie, devastating his family. As Duncan mourns Lincoln, Christmas magic emerges from Lincoln's heart and restores the North Pole, globally turning everything back to normal to resurrect. With the niceness restored and Lincoln revived, the Louds reconcile with him before meeting the restored Santa, who offers Lincoln to restart the day so the Louds can have the Christmas morning they deserved, to which he accepts.

Santa restarts the day, therefore erasing the events from everyone's memories except for Lincoln's. While his siblings open their presents, Lincoln, finally earning his spot on the Nice List, receives a self-titled multi-tool as a reward for his good deed. Watching from the monitors, Santa is proud with the turnout and Duncan's actions. Duncan plans to continue working on T.I.N.N.S.L.

During the credits in the style of Christmas card drawings, the Loud family celebrates Christmas with Albert and Myrtle; Lincoln, Clyde, Howard, and Harold McBride go sledding where they see Santa Claus and Duncan; Lori delivers her Bobby ice sculpture to him with the Casagrandes present; Lucy finally gets an autograph from Krampus; Cheryl and Meryl have their Christmas feast; Gerald delivers towels to Santa's reindeer in their gym; Santa hangs his Naughty Santa suit in his hall of suits; and Duncan oversees T.I.N.N.S.L.'s upgrades.

== Cast ==
- Sawyer Cole as Lincoln Loud
- Piotr Michael as:
  - Santa Claus / Naughty Santa Claus
  - Mysterious Shopkeeper
  - Nutcracker Seller
- Harvey Guillén as Duncan the Christmas Elf
- Grey DeLisle as:
  - Lola Loud
  - Lana Loud
  - Lily Loud
  - Scoots
  - Cheryl Farrell
  - Meryl Farrell
- Lara Jill Miller as Lisa Loud
- Jessica DiCicco as:
  - Lynn Loud Jr.
  - Lucy Loud
- Brian Stepanek as:
  - Lynn Loud Sr.
  - Todd
  - Astronaut #1
- Jaeden White as Clyde McBride
- Jill Talley as:
  - Rita Loud
  - Astronaut #2
- Cristina Pucelli as
  - Luan Loud
  - Child #1
- Chris Parnell as Gerald the Christmas Elf
- Catherine Taber as:
  - Lori Loud
  - Katherine Mulligan
- Liliana Mumy as Leni Loud
- Nika Futterman as Luna Loud
- John DiMaggio as:
  - Bud Grouse
  - Flip
  - Patchy Drizzle
- Daniel DiVenere as Chandler McCann
- Andrew Morgado as Rip Hardcore
- Vargus Mason as Travis the Christmas Elf
- Nick Kishiyama as Richie
- Leigh Joel Scott as Cuckoo Clock Guy
- Archer Vattano as Trent

Additional voices by Caitlyn Connelly, Miguel Gonzalez, Kendra Juul, April M. Lawrence, John Mathot, Darin McGowan, Scott O'Brien, Akemi Okamura, Benjamin Shiff, Erik Steinman, and Trisha Vo

== Production ==
On October 29, 2025, a trailer for the film was released on Nickelodeon's YouTube channel in an unlisted video. In early November, more details on the film were disclosed, including the film being directed by Darin McGowan, and written by Tony Gama-Lobo and Rebecca May. A five-minute clip from the movie was uploaded on The Loud House's official YouTube channel on November 18, 2025.

=== Music ===
A Loud House Christmas Movie: Naughty or Nice (Original Motion Picture Soundtrack)

Cast recording by Republic Records Kids & Family
- Released: November 21, 2025
- Genre: Soundtrack
- Length: 47:40
- Label: Republic Kids & Family

A soundtrack album was released by Republic Records Kids & Family on November 21, 2025, the same day as the film.

No.	Title	Length
1.	"Naughty or Nice"	0:30
2.	"Mission Control"	1:53
3.	"The Loudest Christmas"	1:30
4.	"Ho Ho Ho, It's Time to Go"	1:06
5.	"Off to Gingerhausen"	2:08
6.	"Luan Goes Cuckoo"	0:41
7.	"We're Being Followed"	1:00
8.	"Carol of the Bells"	1:27
9.	"Deck the Halls"	0:41
10.	"Hacking the List"	1:41
11.	"Christmas Morning"	0:36
12.	"Coal"	1:31
13.	"I Beefed It"	1:51
14.	"Back to Gingerhausen"	0:25
15.	"Opening the Portal"	1:33
16.	"The North Poll"	1:05
17.	"The Naughty North"	2:07
18.	"A Plan in Action"	2:32
19.	"New St. Nick"	3:12
20.	"Christmas Rebrand"	1:08
21.	"Santa Clause Is Naughty This Year"	2:30
22.	"The Coal Mines"	1:02
23.	"The Snowball Fight"	2:34
24.	"The Mountain"	1:51
25.	"Hail Santa"	1:20
26.	"Not All Naughty"	1:28
27.	"Santa Returns"	2:36
28.	"Christmas Magic"	1:34
29.	"Lincoln's Christmas Wish"	1:01
30.	"Christmas Morning (Reprise)"	2:25
31.	"Christmas in The Loud House"	1:42
Total length:		47:40

== Release ==
The film premiered in the U.S. on Nickelodeon on November 21, 2025. The film also released in the United Kingdom on December 5, 2025, and elsewhere on December 13.

== Reception ==
=== Critical response ===
Christie Cronan of Common Sense Media rated the film a three-out-of-five stars, stating, "A Loud House Christmas Movie: Naughty or Nice reconnects fans with colorful animation, familiar chaos, and holiday vibes. With a quick pace, easy-to-digest story, and zany energy, the Loud House thankfully has returned to what this 10-year cartoon cult does best—controlled cartoon chaos."

=== Viewership ===
A Loud House Christmas Movie: Naughty or Nice drew a moderate audience upon its premiere, attracting approximately 87,000 viewers aged two and older, according to SpoilerTV+ ratings data.

=== Accolades ===
Award	Date of ceremony	Category	Recipient(s)	Result	Ref.
Annie Awards	February 21, 2026	Best Special Production	A Loud House Christmas Movie: Naughty or Nice	Nominated	

== Continuation ==
Another movie based on The Loud House will also be released. Unlike the previous movies, the film will have a theatrical release by Paramount Pictures under the Paramount Animation label.
