= The Loud House Movie =

2021 American animated film by Dave Needham

- Official release poster
- Directed by: Dave Needham
- Screenplay by: Kevin Sullivan; Chris Viscardi
- Based on: Characters by Chris Savino
- Produced by: Chris Viscardi
- Starring: Asher Bishop; David Tennant; Michelle Gomez; Jill Talley; Brian Stepanek; Catherine Taber; Liliana Mumy; Nika Futterman; Cristina Pucelli; Jessica DiCicco; Grey Griffin; Lara Jill Miller; Katy Townsend; Andre Robinson
- Edited by: Peter Ettinger
- Music by: Philip White (score); Christopher Lennertz (themes)
- Production company: Nickelodeon Movies (Note: Animation outsourced to Top Draw Animation.)
- Distributed by: Netflix
- Release date: August 20, 2021
- Running time: 83 minutes
- Country: United States
- Language: English

The Loud House Movie is a 2021 American animated musical fantasy comedy film based on the Nickelodeon series The Loud House. Produced by Nickelodeon Movies, it was directed by Dave Needham in his directorial debut, from a screenplay by Kevin Sullivan and Chris Viscardi, and starring the voices of David Tennant, Michelle Gomez, Katy Townsend, and the regular voice cast of the series; consisting of Asher Bishop, Jill Talley, Brian Stepanek, Catherine Taber, Liliana Mumy, Nika Futterman, Cristina Pucelli, Jessica DiCicco, Grey Griffin, Lara Jill Miller, and Andre Robinson, who reprise their respective roles.

The first film in the franchise, it is set between the fourth and fifth seasons of The Loud House. The story follows the Loud family as they go to Scotland, where they learn that they are descendants from royalty and own a castle while getting entangled in a plot to drive them away from the island. Originally slated for a 2020 theatrical release by Paramount Pictures, it instead had a digital release on Netflix on August 20, 2021. It received mixed reviews from critics.

== Plot ==
One hectic morning, Lincoln Loud helps his sisters - Lori, Leni, Luna, Luan, Lynn Jr, Lucy, Lana, Lola and Lisa - go through their activities, while also teaching his youngest sister, Lily, how to cope with living in a large family. After a particularly successful day in which the sisters all win awards, they celebrate at the family restaurant, Lynn's Table. There, the Loud sisters are praised by fans while Lincoln is pushed to the side and ignored. Feeling that he is living in their shadows, he consults his best friend, Clyde McBride, who tells him about the time he learnt his grandmother's side of the family was from Paris. Inspired, Lincoln asks his parents, Lynn Sr. and Rita, the same question; Lisa manages to trace Lynn Sr.'s heritage to Scotland.

The family heads to Scotland for a week-long vacation. Shortly after arriving, Lori calls her boyfriend, Bobby, but the signal goes bad. Bobby is led to believe Lori is breaking up with him, going to Scotland himself to find her. The Louds arrive at Loch Loud, where they learn from the citizens that they are descendants of Scottish royalty. They are led to a castle ran by groundskeeper Angus and the disgruntled property caretaker Morag.

Angus shows the family a painting of their ancestors that bears a striking resemblance to them, revealing that they ruled Loch Loud for many years before leaving; Lincoln then learns from Angus that his ancestor, the Duke, ruled Loch Loud and was the most special member of his family. Meanwhile, Lynn and Lana, travelling on the castle grounds, discover an egg belonging to a baby dragon named Lela. Lincoln, donning the Duke suit, joins the family and Lela, who grows quickly when she eats, at dinner. Meanwhile, Morag expresses her frustrations with the Loud family with Angus, who tells her they would only be in Scotland for a week. Later that night, the family meets Lucille Loud, the ghost of one of their ancestors. The following day, Lincoln goes around town to help the villagers, much to Angus' chagrin. Lincoln presents a slideshow that successfully convinces his family to move to Scotland, and afterwards is invested as the Duke of Loch Loud, which deeply frustrates Morag.

Lucille tells Lucy that the Louds' ancestors were driven away by Morag's ancestor, Old Aggie; Morag intends to drive the Louds away once more by using a magical gemstone known as the Dragon Stone that can hypnotize dragons when inserted into the royal scepter. Morag ropes the sisters into performing in the village, and convinces Lincoln to outdo their performance by riding on Lela. Mid-ride, Morag uses the gemstone to hypnotize Lela, sending her out of control and destroying the town. With the villagers turned against him, a heartbroken Lincoln and his family leave Loch Loud. Her mission complete, Morag deliberately feeds Lela so she can grow even more, burns Aggie's journal, and with no Duke leading Loch Loud, crowns herself Duchess.

Lucille catches up with the Louds and tells them that Morag is planning to use Lela to drive away everyone else from Loch Loud. Lincoln and his sisters, determined, sail back to Loch Loud to save the town. His sisters are able to distract Morag and Lela while Lincoln sneaks in to take the scepter back from her. Their fight brings them to the castle grounds, where Morag corners the Louds. She is about to burn them all, but Lincoln distracts her with the crown before she could. Lily joins him as he and Morag face off; he distracts Morag by showing off his magic skills, allowing Lily to swap the scepter with a burrito and for Lela to destroy the Dragon Stone. Not intent on losing, Morag pushes him and Lily off a cliffedge, but all three are saved by Lela.

Lela returns safely with the Louds, who are celebrated for saving the town. Lincoln refuses the crown, deciding to give it, and the title of Duke - with the Louds' ancestors' blessings - to Angus. Lela drops Morag on an island filled with noisy seals, ending her reign of terror. After helping repair the village, the Loud family says goodbye to Angus and the villagers and sets sail back home to Royal Woods. Just as the Louds leave Loch Loud, Bobby arrives to reunite with Lori, only to find out that she left. Clyde welcomes Lincoln back to Royal Woods with some duke-themed cream puffs.

During the credits, still images are shown that include but are not limited to the Duke's ghost riding Lela, Bobby reuniting with Lori, Leni contacting Scott online, Lincoln winning a 3rd place trophy at a magic show, Lela having laid three eggs, and Angus and the ghosts deciding to rescue Morag, who now works as the groundskeeper with Lela keeping her in line.

== Voice cast ==
- Asher Bishop as:
  - Lincoln Loud
  - The Duke
- David Tennant as Angus
- Michelle Gomez as Morag
- Jill Talley as:
  - Rita Loud
  - Rita look-alike 1600s ancestor
- Brian Stepanek as:
  - Lynn Loud Sr.
  - Lynn Sr. look-alike 1600s ancestor
- Catherine Taber as Lori Loud
- Liliana Mumy as:
  - Leni Loud
  - Leni look-alike 1600s ancestor
- Nika Futterman as Luna Loud
- Cristina Pucelli as Luan Loud
- Jessica DiCicco as:
  - Lynn Loud Jr.
  - Lucy Loud
- Grey Griffin as:
  - Lola Loud
  - Lana Loud
  - Lily Loud
  - Scoots
- Lara Jill Miller as:
  - Lisa Loud
  - Lisa look-alike 1600s ancestor
- Katy Townsend as:
  - Lucille Loud
  - Mrs. Scroggins
  - Old Aggie
- Andre Robinson as Clyde McBride
- Carlos PenaVega as Bobby Santiago
- Izabella Alvarez as Ronnie Anne Santiago
- Billy Boyd as:
  - Scott
  - Fisherman
- Jan Johns as:
  - Lela the Dragon
  - Lolo the Dragon
- Candi Milo as Submarine Captain
- Carlos Alazraqui as Bell Ringer
- Debra Wilson as:
  - Nana May
  - Nana Collette
  - Nana Helene
  - Mrs. Turnberry
- Ruth Connell as:
  - Chip Shoppe Owner
  - Cab Driver
- Tru Valentino as Fish Shoppe Owner
- Peter Ettinger as Uncle Jack's Nephew

== Production ==
=== Development ===
On March 28, 2017, Paramount Pictures' president Marc Evans announced a film based on the series originally set for a theatrical release on February 7, 2020. However, in January 2019, Paramount removed the film from their schedule. On February 5, 2019, it was announced that the film would instead be produced for release on Netflix.

Paramount president Marc Evans announced that, during San Diego Comic-Con, the studio will work closely with Viacom's TV brands, most notably Nickelodeon, which includes this movie. When the film was first announced at Comic-Con 2017, series creator Chris Savino stated that the film would be non-canon to the show. Dave Needham later contradicted Savino's claim stating that it is canon since Lily is still in her diaper appearance. In a later interview on the Nerds Social Club Podcast, Needham states that this film takes place during the summer somewhere between "Coupe Dreams" and "Schooled!"

Savino had no involvement on the film after being fired from the show due to sexual harassment allegations back in October 2017. In January 2021, it was announced that the film would be part of Netflix's 2021 film lineup. The film's cast and crew were revealed in April 2021, confirming the entire main cast will be reprising their roles from the show, including new members such as David Tennant, Billy Boyd, and Michelle Gomez. Michael Rubiner, Brian Robbins and Ramsey Naito serve as executive producers.

=== Animation ===
Unlike the series, The Loud House Movie was animated in Flash animation with Toon Boom Harmony produced by Top Draw Animation, an animation studio based in Manila, Philippines. Jam Filled Entertainment, the series' original animation service provider, was not available to produce the animation for the film due to being fully booked with projects outside of The Loud House, which included Thomas & Friends. Animators at Top Draw used reference images from the show to accurately animate the characters.

== Music ==
=== Soundtrack ===
The Loud House Movie (Original Motion Picture Soundtrack)

Soundtrack album by various artists
- Released: August 20, 2021
- Genres: Pop; rock; folk
- Length: 26:27
- Label: Republic Kids & Family
- Producers: Doug Rockwell; Oh, Hush!; Distant Cousins; Music Box; Mattrik; Christopher Lennertz; Philip White

The songs for the film were performed by Oh, Hush!, Grayson DeWolfe, Tide Lines, and Distant Cousins. Christopher Lennertz and Philip White wrote the song "My Way Back Home", and the soundtrack contains three pieces of the film's score by Lennertz and White. The soundtrack was released by Republic Records' Kids & Family imprint on August 20, 2021, coinciding with the film's release, and is available on Spotify and other popular MOD-providers.

==== Track listing ====
No.	Title	Writer(s)	Performer(s)	Length
1.	"Life Is Better Loud"	Doug Rockwell; Michelle Lewis	Rockwell; Lewis	2:29
2.	"Ordinary Me"	Christopher Sernel; Grayson DeWolfe	Asher Bishop; (feat. Oh, Hush! and DeWolfe)	1:26
3.	"This Town Is Named For You"	Ami Kozak; Duvid Swirsky; Dov Rosenblatt	David Tennant; Cast; (feat. Distant Cousins)	1:42
4.	"Loud Castle"	Rockwell; Lewis	Rockwell	1:23
5.	"The Duchess I Will Be"	Jason Gleed; Jordan Yaeger; Julia Piker; Stef Fink	Michelle Gomez	1:59
6.	"I'm Gonna Be The Duke"	Sernel; DeWolfe; Matt Richert	Bishop; Tennant; (feat. Oh, Hush! and DeWolfe)	2:04
7.	"Now or Never"	Sernel; DeWolfe	Oh, Hush!; DeWolfe	1:18
8.	"My Way Back Home"	Christopher Lennertz; Philip White	Tide Lines	2:43
9.	"Let's Get Lost Together"	Kozak; Swirsky; Rosenblatt	Distant Cousins	1:17
10.	"Welcome to Scotland!"	Lennertz; White		2:23
11.	"Lincoln Rides The Dragon"	Lennertz; White		3:44
12.	"Morag's Last Stand"	Lennertz; White		3:52
Total length:				26:27

=== Original score ===
The Loud House Movie (Original Motion Picture Score)

Film score by Philip White and Christopher Lennertz
- Released: September 24, 2021
- Genres: Film score; rock
- Length: 40:09
- Label: Republic Kids & Family
- Producers: Christopher Lennertz; Philip White

Christopher Lennertz chronology
Barb and Star Go to Vista Del Mar (2021)	The Loud House Movie (2021)	13: The Musical (2022)

The score for the film was composed by Philip White, with Christopher Lennertz providing the themes. The album was released by Republic Records' Kids & Family imprint on September 24, 2021 and, like the soundtrack album, is available on Spotify and other popular MOD-providers.

==== Track listing ====
All tracks are written by Philip White and Christopher Lennertz.

No.	Title	Length
1.	"How to Survive in a Big Family"	1:07
2.	"Activity Panic"	0:59
3.	"Where to First?"	1:53
4.	"Lincoln and Clyde"	1:16
5.	"Needles Are for Amateurs"	0:59
6.	"Welcome to Scotland!"	0:47
7.	"What the Sheep?"	1:29
8.	"Your Ancestral Home"	0:39
9.	"Old Timey Us"	1:00
10.	"Our Own Rooms!"	0:58
11.	"The Duke's Room"	1:03
12.	"The Dragon's Egg"	1:00
13.	"Duke-ing"	0:34
14.	"Lucy's Seance"	1:24
15.	"Let's Fulfill Our Destiny"	0:43
16.	"We're Moving to Scotland"	0:39
17.	"Morag's Scream"	0:40
18.	"The Real Story of the Louds of Yore"	2:56
19.	"Snackin' What You're Packin'"	0:34
20.	"I Could Ride the Dragon"	1:38
21.	"Lela Under the Spell"	1:17
22.	"We Trusted You"	1:18
23.	"Abdication"	1:34
24.	"The Mad Queen Morag"	1:08
25.	"Lucille Brings News"	2:06
26.	"Operation Save the Village"	0:51
27.	"Morag Rides Lela"	1:36
28.	"Loud No More"	1:31
29.	"Fifth Best Junior Magician"	0:46
30.	"Lincoln Rides Again"	1:41
31.	"A Simple Groundskeeper"	1:11
32.	"Warm Feelings"	1:41
33.	"The Louds Head Home"	0:57
Total length:		40:09

== Release ==
The Loud House Movie was originally scheduled for a theatrical release of February 7, 2020, however, in January 2019, Paramount Pictures removed it off their release calendar. On February 5, 2019, Viacom's CEO Bob Bakish announced that instead of the theatrical release by Paramount Pictures, the film would instead be released on the streaming service Netflix. This news was later confirmed by an official statement by Netflix announcing a "multi-year deal between Netflix and Nickelodeon" in November 2019. In April 2021, Netflix announced via teaser trailer that the movie would be released during the summer of 2021. In July 2021, Netflix announced via a trailer that the final release date for the film had been set for August 20, 2021.

== Reception ==
The Loud House Movie was met with mixed to positive reviews from critics. Bob Hoose from Focus on the Family's pluggedin.com gave a positive review for the movie saying that "The Loud House Movie is a nicely balanced musical that somehow gives all of the kids—with their distinctive personalities and quirks—a moment to shine. All the while, it also delivers a rollicking, giggle-packed tale of castles, dragons and backstabbing caretakers". Common Sense Media's review published on The Washington Post noted that parents should "expect some name-calling like 'loser' and 'stinkin' Lincoln'," but noted that, "overall this is a funny, heartwarming story that the whole family can enjoy".

=== Accolades ===
Year	Award	Category	Nominee(s)	Result	Ref.
2021	12th Hollywood Music in Media Awards	Original Score — Animated Film	Philip White	Nominated	

== Future ==
The Loud House Movie is the first of four feature-length animated films in the franchise. In March 2024, a feature-length film serving as the series finale to The Loud House spinoff, titled The Casagrandes Movie, was released on Netflix. In April 2024, Nickelodeon announced that a sequel to The Loud House Movie, titled No Time to Spy: A Loud House Movie, was scheduled to premiere in the summer of 2024 on both Paramount+ and Nickelodeon in the USA and internationally. A first teaser trailer was posted on the network's social media and attached to the series' episodes on Paramount+. The movie's poster was also unveiled. On May 10, Nickelodeon announced that the movie would be released on June 21. A fourth animated feature-length film, A Loud House Christmas Movie: Naughty or Nice, was released in November 2025.
