= Really Loud Music =

- The Loud House episode
- Title card
- Episode no.: Season 3 Episode 32
- Directed by: Kyle Marshall
- Written by: Karla Sakas Shropshire; Kevin Sullivan
- Production code: 317
- Original air date: November 23, 2018
- Running time: 22 minutes

Episode chronology
← Previous "The Loudest Thanksgiving"	Next → "Predict Ability"

"Really Loud Music" is the thirty-second episode of the third season of the American animated television series The Loud House. A double length television special, it originally aired on November 23, 2018, on Nickelodeon and was directed by Kyle Marshall and written by Karla Sakas Shropshire and Kevin Sullivan. In this episode, Luna Loud wants to enter the musical contest America's Next Hitmaker but contemplates the type of song she should make that would appeal worldwide.

== Plot ==
Luna Loud prepares to enter her original rock song, "Play It Loud," into a songwriting competition called America's Next Hitmaker, which promises a record deal to the winner. However, after learning that the competition is looking for a song that will appeal to audiences worldwide, Luna begins questioning whether her musical style is popular enough. As she considers different musical genres, she hallucinates her siblings performing songs that reflect their individual personalities, including Lana's toilet jam, Lola's show tune, Lisa's scientific rap, Lori and Leni's slow jam, Luan's comedy song, Lucy's gothic ballad, Lynn's energetic anthem, her parents' country duet, and Lincoln and Clyde's friendship song.

Overwhelmed by the variety of musical styles, Luna struggles to decide what kind of song to submit. Her uncertainty eventually disappears when she hears a catchy pop song playing on the radio. She watches as her family, their friends, the pets, and people around the world enthusiastically dance to it. Convinced that bubblegum pop is the genre everyone enjoys, Luna writes a new song called "What Everybody Wants" and submits it to the competition.

Sometime later, Luna discovers that her song has been selected as one of the five finalists, earning her an opportunity to perform on the show. However, upon arriving at the venue, she meets the competition's judges, Michelle and Doug, who believe she needs to change her appearance and musical identity to appeal to a wider audience. They give her a makeover, rename her "Lulu," and insist that she abandon her original style. Feeling uncomfortable with the changes, Luna realizes that she has compromised her individuality in pursuit of fame.

During the competition, Luna surprises the audience by refusing to perform as Lulu. Instead, she reveals her original appearance and performs "Play It Loud," returning to the rock music that represents her true personality. When Michelle and Doug attempt to interrupt her performance, Lynn and Lana stop them using the stage's special effects. Luna successfully finishes her song to the audience's excitement. Although she may have sacrificed her opportunity for worldwide fame, she is satisfied knowing that she has remained true to herself.

== Voice cast ==
- Nika Futterman as Luna Loud
- Collin Dean as Lincoln Loud
  - Jackson Petty as Lincoln's singing voice
- Catherine Taber as Lori Loud
- Liliana Mumy as Leni Loud
- Cristina Pucelli as Luan Loud
- Jessica DiCicco as:
  - Lynn Loud Jr.
  - Lucy Loud
- Grey Griffin as:
  - Lana Loud
  - Lola Loud
  - Lily Loud
- Lara Jill Miller as Lisa Loud
- Andre Robinson as Clyde McBride
- Brian Stepanek as Lynn Loud Sr.
- Jill Talley as Rita Loud
- John DiMaggio as Mr. Grouse
- Jeff Bennett as Mick Swagger
- Rachel Butera as Michelle
  - Michelle Lewis as Michelle's singing voice
- Doug Rockwell as Doug
- Tova Litvin as Pop Singer

== Production ==
"Really Loud Music" is a special episode that was written by frequent series writers Karla Sakas Shropshire and Kevin Sullivan and directed by head director Kyle Marshall. The episode began development when Nickelodeon producers approached songwriters Michelle Lewis and Doug Rockwell, who had previously collaborated on The Loud House's theme song, to create a musical special centered on Luna Loud. The show's writers initially developed the concept around a singing competition inspired by American Idol, with Lewis and Rockwell composing more than a dozen original pop songs. The songwriting process was collaborative, with the composers involved in developing the story and deciding where songs would fit naturally into the episode. Some songs were originally two to three minutes long before being shortened to fit the episode's 22-minute runtime, while an opening medley featuring the Loud family proved particularly challenging to arrange.

== Release and reception ==
"Really Loud Music" was originally broadcast on Nickelodeon on November 23, 2018. The episode was watched by 1.25 million viewers on its initial premiere, a slight drop from the 1.47 million viewers the previous episode, "The Loudest Thanksgiving", garnered on its initial airing. Bubbleblabber's John Schwarz rated it a 6.5 out of 10, praising "Play It Loud" and its accompanying music video while criticizing the otherwise forgettable songs, excessive buildup to the competition, and lack of focus on the other contestants and Loud family members. In an interview, series executive producer Michael Rubiner and series producer Karen Malach both considered it to be their favorite episode, Malach stating it was "awesome and so much fun".

== Home media ==
The episode was first released as one of the episodes included in the Intégrale de la saison 3 DVD in France in 2020. The episode would later be featured in the Cooked DVD in 2021, which features the second half of the third season. Afterwards, the episode would be featured as part of The Complete Third Season DVD in 2022, which houses the entire third season of the series, as well as The Complete Seasons 1, 2 & 3 DVD in 2024.

== Soundtrack ==
Really Loud Music

Cast recording by The Loud House
- Released: April 10, 2020
- Genre: Soundtrack
- Length: 14:10

The soundtrack album for "Really Loud Music" was released on April 10, 2020, under the same title, featuring all fifteen songs from the special.

No.	Title	Performer(s)	Length
1.	"Play It Loud"	Nika Futterman	0:54
2.	"Best Thing Ever"	Tova Litvin	1:38
3.	"Toilet Jam"	Grey Griffin	0:26
4.	"Glam Song"	Griffin	0:46
5.	"Song of Silence"	Jessica DiCicco	0:30
6.	"Get Pumped"	DiCicco	0:32
7.	"Periodic Table Rap"	Lara Jill Miller	0:22
8.	"Lori2Leni"	Liliana Mumy • Catherine Taber	1:11
9.	"Luan's Laugh Parade"	Cristina Pucelli	0:25
10.	"That's Our Kinda Song"	Brian Stepanek • Jill Talley	0:43
11.	"Best Buds"	Jackson Petty • Andre Robinson	0:29
12.	"Changing Luna"	Doug Rockwell • Michelle Lewis	1:02
13.	"What Everybody Wants"	Futterman	1:00
14.	"What Have I Done?"	Futterman	2:36
15.	"Play It Loud (Reprise)"	Futterman	1:36
Total length:			14:10
