= Wolfgang Schaeffer =

American actor (born 2009)

- Born: Wolfgang Cecil Schaeffer; August 31, 2009 (age 17); Lynchburg, Virginia, United States
- Occupation: Actor
- Years active: 2020–present

Wolfgang Schaeffer (born August 31, 2009) is an American actor. He is best known for playing the main character Lincoln Loud in the Nickelodeon comedy television series The Really Loud House as well as its two films A Loud House Christmas and A Really Haunted Loud House.

== Early life ==
Wolfgang was born on August 31, 2009, in Lynchburg, Virginia to Brian Schaeffer and Catherine Schaeffer.

== Career ==
Schaeffer's first appearance on TV came in Criminal Minds. He plays the younger version of Will Tranfo's character Shelby Mattison.

Schaeffer landed the main role in the live-action television film of The Loud House titled A Loud House Christmas where he portrayed Lincoln Loud. Schaeffer reprised his role in the spin-off television series The Really Loud House and the second television movie A Really Haunted Loud House. In 2023, Schaeffer was nominated for favorite Male TV star at the 2023 Kids' Choice Awards but lost out to Joshua Bassett. He was nominated for the same award again at the 2024 Kids' Choice Awards. This time, he lost to Walker Scobell.

== Personal life ==
Schaeffer has an older sister named Summer who is also an actress.

== Filmography ==
=== Film ===
Year	Title	Role	Notes
2021	A Loud House Christmas	Lincoln Loud	
2023	A Really Haunted Loud House	Lincoln Loud	

=== Television ===
Year	Title	Role	Notes
2020	Criminal Minds	Young Shelby Mattson	Episode: "Spectator Slowing"
2022	Pivoting	Evan	Episode: "2 episodes"
2022–2024	The Really Loud House	Lincoln Loud	Main cast; 39 episodes
2024	The Tiny Chef Show	Himself	Episode: "Potato Jackets"
