= Loud (surname) =

Loud is an English and Scottish surname.

== Persons ==
Notable people with this surname include:

- Eugene F. Loud (1847–1908), U.S. Representative from California
- George A. Loud (1852–1925), American politician
- Graham Loud (born 1953), British historian
- Hulda Barker Loud (1844–1911), American newspaper editor
- John J. Loud (1844–1916), American inventor
- Lance Loud (1951–2001), American television personality, magazine columnist, and performer
- Marguerite St. Leon Loud (1812–1889), American poet and writer
- May Hallowell Loud (1860–1916), American painter

== Pseudonyms ==
- Lorraine Crosby (born 1960), British singer whose stagename is "Mrs. Loud"

== Fictional ==
The following main characters from The Loud House who were major supporting characters in its spinoff, The Casagrandes:

- Lincoln Loud
- Lori Loud
- Leni Loud
- Luna Loud
- Luan Loud
- Lynn Loud
- Lucy Loud
- Lana Loud
- Lola Loud
- Lisa Loud
- Lily Loud
- Lynn Loud Sr.
- Rita Loud

The following characters from An American Family:

- Bill Loud
- Pat Loud
- Lance Loud
- Kevin Robert Loud
- Grant Loud
- Delilah Ann Loud
- Michele Loud

== See also ==
- The Loud Family
- The Loud House
