= Annaka Fourneret =

American actress (born 2008)

Annaka Felix Fourneret
- Occupation: Actress
- Years active: 2018–present

Annaka Felix Fourneret (born February 13, 2008) is an American actress. She is best known for playing Lynn Loud Jr. in the Nickelodeon comedy television series The Really Loud House as well as the franchise's second live-action film A Really Haunted Loud House.

== Early life ==
Fourneret grew up as an only child with her mother and cat. Her favorite actress is Anya Taylor Joy.

== Career ==
Fourneret revealed her career started when she was just 9 months old. Her father was chased around by a casting director for GAP while they were shopping at The Grove at Farmers Market. Fourneret's first appearance on the big screen came in the comedy drama series Lethal Weapon. Fourneret made an appearance in the comedy series Loot starring Maya Rudolph. Fourneret later portrayed Lynn Loud Jr. in The Really Loud House where the character was previously portrayed by Morgan McGill in A Loud House Christmas. Fourneret returned with the rest of the cast for season 2.

== Personal life ==
Fourneret enjoys surfing, rock climbing, ziplining, and skiing.

== Filmography ==
=== Film ===
Year	Title	Role	Notes
2020	Tell Her	Georgia	
2023	A Really Haunted Loud House	Lynn Loud	

=== Television ===
Year	Title	Role	Notes
2018	Legion	10 Year old girl	Episode: "Chapter 15"
2021	Danger Force	Sydney	Episode: "A Cyborg Among Us"
2022	The Fairly OddParents: Fairly Odder	Courtney	Episode: "Codzillard!"
2022	Loot	Alex	Episode: "Excitement Park"
2022–2024	The Really Loud House	Lynn Loud	Main cast; 39 episodes
