= Lexi DiBenedetto =

American actress

- Born: Lexi Capriana DiBenedetto; Carolina Beach, North Carolina, United States
- Occupation: Actress
- Years active: 2007–present

Lexi Capriana DiBenedetto is an American actress. She is best known for playing Prudence in Knight Squad and Lori Loud in the Nickelodeon comedy television series The Really Loud House as well as its two films A Loud House Christmas and A Really Haunted Loud House.

== Early life ==
DiBenedetto got into the business very young when she appeared in a commercial and from there in short films. When she was 5 she knew she wanted to be an actor. She begged her parents to let her go into an adult acting class, the only acting class in her area

== Career ==
DiBenedetto won the 2014 Young Artist Award for Best Young Actress, Guest Starring Performance in a TV Drama Series for her role in Grey's Anatomy. DiBenedetto was again nominated for the award the next year for Martyrs but this time lost out to Karlee Roberts.

DiBenedetto's first major role in a TV series was as Prudence in Knight Squad where the character is a "one-quarter giant".

In 2021, DiBenedetto worked in the live-action television film of The Loud House titled A Loud House Christmas where she portrayed Lori Loud. DiBenedetto reprised her role in the spin-off television series The Really Loud House and the second television movie A Really Haunted Loud House.

== Filmography ==
=== Film ===
Year	Title	Role	Notes
2007	Fall Down Dead	Zoe Wallace	Short
2008	Whispers	Young Shayna	Short
2008	The Jaunt		Short
2010	Eye Wide Open	Mia	Short
2010	Regular Kids		Short
2011	Harleys Hill	Chloe	
2011	The Brightest Sunday	Luna	
2012	Love Is All You Need?	Ashley	Short
2015	Martyrs	Daughter	
2015	Memoria	Kelly	
2016	Love Is All You Need?	Ashley Curtis	
2016	The Red Cape	Daughter in Audience	Short
2021	A Loud House Christmas	Lori Loud	
2023	A Really Haunted Loud House	Lori Loud	

=== Television ===
Year	Title	Role	Notes
2011	Criminal Minds	Sarah	Episode; With Friends Like These
2011	RCVR	Charlene	Recurring role
2013	Grey's Anatomy	Simmi Johnson	Episode: "Bad Blood"
2015	Modern Family	Kylie	Episode: "Crying Out Loud"
2015	Instant Mom	Bianca Vonwright	2 episodes
2017	Guidance	Jessica	Episode: "Dead Ball"
2017	Lux in Effect	Kylie	Episode: "Pilot"
2018-2019	Knight Squad	Prudence	Main role
2022–2024	The Really Loud House	Lori Loud	Recurring role
