= Jolie Jenkins =

American actress (born 1974)

- Born: March 7, 1974 (age 52)
- Occupation: Actress
- Years active: 1998–present

Jolie Jenkins (born March 7, 1974) is an American actress. She is best known for portraying the live-action version of Rita Loud in the comedy television series The Really Loud House as well as the film A Really Haunted Loud House.

== Early life ==
Jenkins was born on March 7, 1974, in the United States. She attended Torrey Pines High School and graduated with a bachelor's degree in theater from Occidental College.

== Career ==
She had starring roles in the television shows Alexa and Katie and Shasta McNasty. Additionally, she has appeared on shows like The West Wing, Becker, The X-Files, JAG, Las Vegas, The Game, and 2 Broke Girls.

From 2022 to 2024, Jenkins portrayed Loud family matriarch Rita Loud in The Really Loud House, replacing Muretta Moss from A Loud House Christmas.

== Filmography ==
=== Film ===
Year	Title	Role	Notes
2000	Psycho Beach Party	Angie	
2001	Net Worth	Unknown	
2002	Buying The Cow	Amber	
2002	Simone	Premier Audience Member	
2007	Spellbound	Jackie	
2009	Best Thing Ever	Tess	
2011	Blind	Erin	Short film
2015	Hopefully Romantic	The Best Friend	Short film
2023	Jesus Revolution	Pilar	
2023	A Really Haunted Loud House	Rita Loud	

=== Television ===
Year	Title	Role	Notes
1998	USA High	Nadia	Episode: "From Russia With Love"
1999	Two of a Kind	Antoinette	Episode: "Welcome Matt"
1999	Party of Five	Melanie	2 episodes
1999	Horse Sense	Gina	Television film
2000	Time of Your Life	Molly	2 episodes
1999–2000	Shasta McNasty	Diana	21 episodes
2001	The West Wing	Stephanie Gault	Episode: "Somebody's Going to Emergency, Somebody's Going to Jail"
2001	Becker	Lisa	Episode: "Small Wonder"
2001–2002	The X-Files	Leyla Harrison	
2003	JAG	Kylie	Episode: "Each of Us Angels"
2004	Good Morning, Miami	Cheryl	Episode: "The Wait Problem"
2004	Las Vegas	Lisa Lundquist	Episode: "The Count of Montecito"
2004	Medical Investigation	Lillith	Episode: "Mutation"
2005	Desperate Housewives	Deirdre Taylor	2 episodes
2005	CSI: Miami	Gina Rankin	Episode: "48 Hours to Life"
2006	Four Kings	Jessica	Episode: "Take of The Tape"
2006	Modern Men	Jennifer	2 episodes
2007	Psych	Sandra Panitch	Episode: "Cloudy...With A Chance of Murder"
2007	The Game	Camille	Episode: "You Say You Want a Revolution"
1999–2007	Xyber 9: New Dawn	Princess Roselyn (voice)	Main role
2007	How I Met Your Mother	Alexa	Episode: "How I Met Everyone Else"
2008	Novel Adventures	Amy Pierson	8 episodes
2009	The Mentalist	Mandy Riljek	Episode: "Scarlett Fever"
2009	Ghost Whisperer	Casey Sullivan	Episode: "Till Death Do Us Start"
2011	Criminal Minds: Suspect Behavior	Molly Weller	Episode: "Two of a Kind"
2012	Body of Proof	Julie Tompkins	2 episodes
2012	Body of Proof: Outbreak	Julie Tompkins	5 episodes
2012	The Exes	Susan	Episode: "What Women Want"
2012	Private Practice	Producer	Episode: "The Next Episode"
2013	Devious Maids	Julie	Episode: "Walking the Dog"
2014	Mixology	Nina	Episode: "Bruce & Fab"
2016	House of Lies	Cpt Megan Dunleavy	Episode: "Above Board Metrics"
2017	2 Broke Girls	Janice	Episode: "And the Emergency Contractor"
2016–2017	Liv and Maddie	Aunt Dena	Recurring role
2017–2019	One Day at a Time	Nikki	4 episodes
2020	Carol's Second Act	Malinda	Episode: "Plus Ones"
2018–2020	Alexa and Katie	Jennifer Cooper	Main role
2021	Sydney to the Max	Gemma	Episode: "A Crush of Their Own"
2022–2024	The Really Loud House	Rita Loud	Main role
