= Sophia Woodward =

American actress

- Born: 26 March 2004 (age 22); Oklahoma City, Oklahoma, United States
- Occupation: Actress
- Years active: 2017–present

Sophia Woodward is an American actress. She is best known for playing Luna Loud in the Nickelodeon comedy television series The Really Loud House as well as its two films A Loud House Christmas and A Really Haunted Loud House.

== Early life ==
Sophia Woodward has two siblings, a younger sister and a younger brother. She was born in Oklahoma, but has also lived in Virginia, Montana, California, and New Mexico. Her first experience acting was in musical theatre at the age of 9. Her favorite film is The Silence of the Lambs.

== Career ==
Woodward's first appearance on the big screen came in the comedy drama series Lethal Weapon. She plays the younger version of Kristen Gutoskie's character Molly. She then made an appearance in both the short and television series versions of a Sunny Family Cult.

In 2021, Woodward worked in the live-action television film of The Loud House titled A Loud House Christmas, where she portrayed Luna Loud. For the role, she cut her hair to match Luna's near pixie cut length. Woodward reprised her role in the spin-off television series The Really Loud House and the second television movie A Really Haunted Loud House.

Woodward is currently scheduled to appear in the 2026 BRG short film Oceanless Beach.

== Personal life ==
Woodward has named Ben Platt, Sarah Paulson, and Jenna Ortega as her biggest influences. She admires Ben Platt for his ability to jump between mediums, Sarah Paulson for her longevity, and Jenna Ortega for what she has accomplished at her young age.

== Filmography ==
=== Film ===
Year	Title	Role	Notes
2017	Sunny Family Cult	Teen Taylor	Short
2021	A Loud House Christmas	Luna Loud	Television film
2023	A Really Haunted Loud House	Luna Loud	Television film
2026	Oceanless Beach	Beth	Short

=== Television ===
Year	Title	Role	Notes
2017	Sunny Family Cult	Taylor	Episode: "Copycat"
2017-2018	Lethal Weapon	Young Molly	Episodes: "Gold Rush"; "Jesse's Girl"
2018	See Plum Run	Little Girl	Episodes: "The Rumor Mill"; "Dirty Talk"
2019	Game Shakers	Cassie	Episode: "Hungry Hungry Hypno"
2022–2024	The Really Loud House	Luna Loud	Main cast; 28 episodes
