= Lexi Janicek =

American actress (born 2011)

- Born: August 19, 2011 (age 15); Brentwood, Tennessee, US
- Occupation: Actress
- Years active: 2018–present

Lexi Janicek (born August 19, 2011) is an American actress. She is best known for playing Lisa Loud in the Nickelodeon comedy television series The Really Loud House as well as its two films A Loud House Christmas and A Really Haunted Loud House.

== Early life ==
Janicek was born in Brentwood, Tennessee. She is the youngest of 4 children, having 3 older brothers.

== Career ==
Janicek became interested in acting when one of her friends was working on a web series and she decided to see if acting was something she could do. She contacted an agency in Nashville kicking off her acting career. Janicek made her on screen debut in the awarding winning short Potters Ground.

In 2021, Janicek portrayed Lisa Loud in the live-action television film of The Loud House, A Loud House Christmas, where she wore fake glasses and a short brown-haired wig over her natural blonde hair for the role. She reprised the role in the spin-off television series The Really Loud House and the second television movie A Really Haunted Loud House. Janicek has also had a recurring role in Echo 3 where she plays the younger version of Jessie Collins character Amber.

== Personal life ==
Janicek competes with her local gymnastics team and is a big fan of video games. Her favorite television show is Stranger Things while her favorite film series is Harry Potter.

== Filmography ==
=== Film ===
Year	Title	Role
2021	Potter's Ground	Goldie
2021	A Loud House Christmas	Lisa Loud
2022	The People We Hate at the Wedding	Young Alice
2023	A Really Haunted Loud House	Lisa Loud
2024	The Legend of Lake Hollow	Lake Girl

=== Television ===
Year	Title	Role	Notes
2018	Potter's Ground	Goldie Potter	Short
2020	Darker Colors	Amber	Short film
2021	Pikwik Pack	JJ Giraffe	Episode: "Fuzzly Little Buddy/Point of Light"
2021	Ordinary Joe	10 year old Ginnie	Episode: "Happy Birthday Ginnie"
2022	Action Pack	Little Girl	Episode: "Chores Galore/Play Time"
2021-2022	T.O.T.S.	Faye, Darcy	2 episodes
2022	Duck & Goose	Bunny, Rabbit	2 episodes
2022–2024	The Really Loud House	Lisa Loud	Main cast; 27 episodes
2023	Echo 3	Young Amber	3 episodes
