= Eva Carlton =

American actress

- Born: Atlanta, Georgia, United States
- Occupation: Actress
- Years active: 2019–present

Eva Carlton is an American actress. She is best known for playing Odludu in a voice role in Where's Waldo?, and Leni Loud in the Nickelodeon comedy television series The Really Loud House as well as its second film A Really Haunted Loud House.

== Early life ==
Carlton was born in Atlanta, Georgia. Her first experience of acting was when she auditioned for Zorro at her regional theatre. She sang One Direction's "What Makes You Beautiful". Despite not getting the part the director called her parents and told her she was really talented. She has said that Selena Gomez and Ariana Grande were her idols growing up.

== Career ==
Carlton's made her on screen debut playing two minor roles in the fantasy comedy Little. Carlton's first main role was voicing Odlulu in the cartoon Where's Waldo?. During filming, someone got her a signed headshot of Ian Somerhalder, her celebrity crush at the time.

Carlton joined the cast of The Really Loud House as Leni Loud replacing Dora Dolphin from A Loud House Christmas while wearing a blonde wig over her natural brown hair. Carlton was worried with the backlash of Dolphin not returning, but said she was made feel at home by the rest of the cast. Carlton reprised her role in the second television movie A Really Haunted Loud House.

== Personal life ==
Carlton has a younger sister named Chloe and a chocolate Labrador named Charlie.

== Filmography ==
=== Film ===
Year	Title	Role	Notes
2019	Little	Caren Greene, Jasmine	
2023	A Really Haunted Loud House	Leni Loud	

=== Television ===
Year	Title	Role	Notes
2019-2021	Where's Waldo?	Odlulu (voice)	Main role
2022–2024	The Really Loud House	Leni Loud	Main role
