= Dora Dolphin =

American actress

- Born: Minneapolis, Minnesota, United States
- Occupation: Actress, Dancer
- Years active: 2019–present

Dora Dolphin is an American actress and dancer. She is best known for playing Leni Loud in the Nickelodeon comedy movie A Loud House Christmas.

== Early life ==
Dolphin was born in Minneapolis to Gregory and Joanie Dolphin. Dolphin started dancing at 2 and a half years old. She was called a great dancer from a very young age. She has won at regional and national dance competitions from Florida to California to Chicago. Dolphin was the first child ever to get nominated for a SAGE Award.

== Career ==
After lending her voice in the 2019 video games The Blackout Club and Gylt, Dolphin made her on screen debut as Leni Loud in the 2021 television film A Loud House Christmas. When it came to The Really Loud House, the role of Leni was recast to Eva Carlton.

In 2025, Dolphin played Karen Childress in the play Stranger Things: The First Shadow.

== Personal life ==
In 2016, Dolphin's father Gregory was diagnosed with Frontotemporal dementia and eventually succumbed to the disease in 2024.

== Filmography ==
=== Film ===
Year	Title	Role	Notes
2021	A Loud House Christmas	Leni Loud	Television film

=== Television ===
Year	Title	Role	Notes
2023	Stillwater	Maddy	Episode: The Catch/Missing Out
2023	The Villains of Valley View	Shadow	3 episodes

=== Video Games ===
Year	Title	Role	Notes
2019	The Blackout Club	Gwen	
2019	Gylt	Sally	

== Theatre ==
Year	Title	Role	Notes
2025	Stranger Things: The First Shadow	Karen Childress	
