= Xyber 9: New Dawn =

- Promotion Image
- Also known as: Saban's Xyber 9: New Dawn
- Genre: Animation; Science-fiction
- Developed by: Eric Luke
- Directed by: Phillip Norwood
- Voices of: René Auberjonois; Tim Curry; Quinton Flynn; Nika Futterman; Tony Jay; Jolie Jenkins; Dominique Jennings; Tom Kane; Jason Marsden; Christopher Marquette; Rodney Saulsberry; Frank Welker
- Composer: David Ari Leon
- Country of origin: United States
- Original language: English
- No. of seasons: 1
- No. of episodes: 22

Production
- Executive producers: Eric Luke; Phillip Norwood; Nilo Rodis-Jamero; Eric S. Rollman
- Producer: Joe Barruso
- Running time: 22 minutes
- Production companies: Bokabi Productions; Saban Entertainment

Original release
- Network: Fox Kids
- Release: September 25 – December 4, 1999; February 24 – April 8, 2007

Saban's Xyber 9: New Dawn is an American animated television series produced by Bokabi and Saban Entertainment. It originally debuted on the Fox Kids network on September 25, 1999. Only 10 episodes aired before it was cancelled on December 4, 1999. Soon after, it was aired in its entirety on Irish television network RTÉ Two from 2 July to August 2001. Six years later, it appeared on Toon Disney as part of the channel's Jetix line up. In addition to re-airing the first 10 episodes, the remaining 12 episodes aired from February 24, 2007, through April 8, 2007, although these episodes were made in 2000.

Ownership of the series passed to Disney in 2001 when Disney acquired Fox Kids Worldwide, which also includes Saban Entertainment.

== Synopsis ==
A glorious world... falls. From the ashes rise... good, and evil. The times call for a hero! A hero to master the greatest power the world has ever known: Xyber 9!

Jack, a precocious, blonde fifteen-year-old who is an orphan, is given the title of the Chosen One. The people of Terrana, a futuristic realm that is amidst a war, rely upon him as the last hope to save their civilization. If Jack can achieve the Herculean task of destroying Machestro, the evil ruler of the underworld, he will be named king.

Jack's greatest weapon against Machestro is the sophisticated computer Xyber 9 that is in the form of a staff. With Xyber 9's power, Jack journeys through Machestro's underworld and to other futuristic lands, fighting intergalactic evil with an ever-increasing band of allies. In order to enfeeble the Chosen One, Machestro tries desperately to snare Xyber 9 for without the powerful computer, Jack would be defenseless. And with it, Machestro could spread his disease of evil throughout Terrana and beyond, conquering other worlds and ruling in his tyranny. He even does his plots with the aid of King Renard.

At the end of the original run, Jack finds the protected valley, a location left by Terrana's advanced ancestors and a protected valley with genetically-altered crops that could grow in two days time, and need very little water and nutrients, which Jack shows to the people to help return Terrana back into its previous state. It is also revealed that Machestro rules over the Machina by giving them hope that they will be able to reclaim the surface by turning it dark. This is because the Machina have a virus that causes them to be in great pain when traveling into the sunlight believing it will kill them due to a curse. Ikira, a former Machina learned that even though the sunlight causes great pain, it is the cure to the infection after which they would be able to walk on the surface. Machestro knows this, but does not let the Machina know out of fear of them removing him as leader.

== Characters ==
=== Heroes ===
- Jack (voiced by Jason Marsden) - A 15-year-old orphan who becomes the Chosen one for the people of Terrana after he discovers Xyber 9. He hates to be called "boy" and insists to be called by his name. He is not afraid to stand up and fight, though they lead him to be impulsive at times.
- Xyber 9 (voiced by René Auberjonois) - The last known Xyber, or thinking machine, who was given the ability to have independent thought that acts as Jack's weapon against Machestro and other threats to Terrana. He often talks with sarcasm or a high society view on the poor world but is often the voice of reason to Jack. Xyber 9 does not appreciate it when Jack uses him as a tool of any kind especially when it involves being used to whack enemies or as a pick to dig.
- Anakonda (voiced by Nika Futterman) - Also known as Ana, Anakonda is a mysterious red-haired girl from the Dark Lands. Raised by snakes, Ana's name is actually a nickname from Jack as her real name was too long. She is in tune with nature and can hear things that others cannot and sense things due to honed senses. She has obvious feelings for Jack as she kissed him after she thought he had died. However, she is a fearsome warrior who is not afraid to give a smart remark. Also, she is jealous of Roselyn's affections for Jack and often comments about her pampered ways which are a sharp contrast to her own jungle background.
- Ikira (voiced by Christopher Marquette) - A legendary swordsman who joins Jack on his quest as a teacher and is a former Machina. Cured when as a punishment the Machina tied him to a rock of the surface to be killed by the sunlight, but ended up being cured of the Machina infection instead.
- Mick (voiced by Quinton Flynn) - A confident young man and is not afraid to jump in a situation if it means a chance for a reward such as jewels or money. He is cocky, somewhat selfish, and has more than once gotten into a tight spot due to this. He is also extremely prejudiced and distrustful of the Ikira, and belittling and mocking of Anakonda and her traditions. Despite his inherent self serving nature, he has more than once come to the aid of one of his teammates even if it means putting himself at risk.
- Willy (voiced by Rodney Saulsberry) - Teammate of Mick, Willy is a tall strong black man who is an excellent cook. However, he knows his way in a fight and can handle various types of weaponry. He is the most silent one in the group but when he talks it is usually with sense and he is the one who can best put a lid on Mick's remarks often telling him "Mick... you're a foo'" or simply telling his friend to shut up.
- Queen Tatania (voiced by Dominique Jennings) - A courageous dark-skinned woman who leads her soldiers without fear against King Renard and offers an alliance with Jack after he saves her life. Despite the fact Jack gets into much trouble and she initially doesn't believe his tales of the Machina, she maintains faith in him.
- Princess Roselyn (voiced by Jolie Jenkins) - The daughter of King Renard who seems to have feelings for Jack as he does for her. She was ignorant of her father's evil actions but learned first hand about the other side to her father. She then realized that she had to grow up to save the kingdom from her father's tyrant ways. She and Ana are somewhat jealous of each other for being affiliated with Jack, seeing the other as a threat, even sizing one another up in more than one episode by picking on their differences due to their backgrounds.

=== Villains ===
- Machina - The Machina are a race of people who live underground and wear full body suits with masks. They are the people led by Machestro and fear the sunlight as it causes them to experience excruciating pain when it hits their skin. Therefore, they never go above ground without clothing that fully covers their bodies and features even then a strong blast of sunlight will still cause them pain. Prior to the series, Ikira discovered that after several hours of direct exposure to sunlight, Machina will not die, but be cured if they can endure the considerable pain.
  - Machestro (voiced by Tony Jay) - An evil Machina who rules the underworld of Machina and wishes to take over Terrana. Like all Machina, he too is sensitive to sunlight as seen in episode 1 when his face begins to burn, resulting in him wearing a darkened face helmet to protect himself.
  - Tekada - A short Machina who is a form of adviser to Machestro. He is often the brunt of Machestro's displays of anger though he tries his best to appease his lord and give advice.
  - Tunnel Rats - The name of the grunts used by Machestro.
- King Renard (voiced by Tim Curry) - Beloved by his followers, he is secretly in allegiance with Machestro in his attempts to steal Xyber 9 so they can take over other worlds. He follows Machestro without question in hoping of being his ruling right-hand man.

=== Other characters ===
- Honk (vocal effects provided by Frank Welker) - A strange pig/bulldog mix creature with horns, he befriended Jack after Jack saved his life and he tags along as his companion. He tries his best to defend his master, but is often reduced to simply doing his name sake: honk.
- Captain Montand (voiced by Tom Kane) - The leader of Queen Tatiana's cavalry. He is the one who voices the most doubt about Jack being on their side but eventually learns to trust him despite not agreeing with his methods. He does things by the book and is constantly telling Jack not to act solo and put himself at risk so much. However he recognizes Jack's courage and heroism and finally accepts him after Jack saves his life and almost sacrifices his own to save everyone else.
- Miss Thorpe - The teacher and escort for Princess Roselyn. She is somewhat strict with her but obviously has the princess' best interests at heart and will even tease her, letting the princess have a free rein. In reality she is a form of freedom fighter in King Renard's kingdom who hides in the shadows but she holds priority over guarding Roselyn. Mick has a crush on her to which she brushes off or acts coy.
- Slick - An old friend of Mick's who now works for King Renard because of good pay but admits he plunders on the side. He previously stole Mick's diamonds as well as his girl, leaving Mick all but happy as he took the rap. He is as his name implies: slick and untrustworthy.

== Episodes ==
No.	Title	Directed by	Written by	Original release date	Prod. code
1	"Origins"	Phill Norwood	Eric Luke	September 25, 1999	101
2	"Origins"	Phill Norwood	Eric Luke	September 25, 1999	102
3	"Origins"	Phill Norwood	Eric Luke	October 2, 1999	103
Part 1 (New Acquaintances): A 15 year old young man named Jack is caught up between the fight between two kingdoms while trying to make his way around the world in hopes of finding a Weapons Master to teach him. While tagging along with a convoy King Renard's forces, a man foretells of "a ray of hope, a young boy king" who will save the kingdom. After an incident occurs and he is chased by the soldiers, Jack ends up in the feared Dark Lands. There he unknowingly ruins the evil Machestro's plans by taking the mysterious artifact known as Xyber 9 that appears to have a mind of its own. Part 2 (Enter Ikira): Jack continues his search for a Weapons Master to learn from and comes to a town plagued with a monster that has caused its river to run dry. However things look grim as Jack and Xyber 9 quickly learn that many men have died from facing this monster. He then meets an old man, Ikira, who he finds out to be one of the best swordsmen around before he fell to ruin to be a mere beggar, losing his swords and uniform. Placing his hopes in Ikira, Jack helps him regain his warrior's pride before going off to face the monster in hopes to free the town and gain the reward. It is here that Jack meets King Renard's beautiful daughter and both show interest in one another. Part 3 (First Impressions): With the water supply restored to the town, Jack and his companions, Ikira, Mick, Willy and the mysterious person from the wilderness receive their reward: a deed to the right of ownership of the valley above the dam. Despite the dismal looking reward, the group soon realize thanks to Xyber 9's input that a vault of some sort is located there. However when they try to get in, they find themselves in need of a passcode. Just as Princess Roselyn gives the group her word they will not be attacked, her father comes in pursuit of Xyber 9. However the enemy fleet led by Queen Tatania appears and fighting breaks out. When Tatania's plane is shot down, Jack rescues her and the two establish an alliance against Renard.
4	"Queen Tatania"	Phill Norwood	Eric Luke	October 16, 1999	104
While aboard Queen Tatania's battle ship, HMS Independence, to fight King Renard's forces, Jack faces some skepticism from crew members that he is on their side. As he encounters accusations of being a spy due to his hazy connections with Renard's daughter, sabotage becomes apparent on the ship as a bomb goes off. Unfortunately it went off right when Jack was about to insert Xyber 9 into the ship and so he is blamed for the incident. Jack is then locked away due to Queen Tatania fearing the moral of her soldiers going down thanks to the current incidents revolving around Jack. However both Jack and Xyber 9 know that the real spy and saboteur is running loose on the ship undetected.
5	"Heart of the Ancients"	Phill Norwood	Eric Luke	October 9, 1999	105
Using the cover of a battle between Tatania and Renard's forces, Jack and his band enter an old railway system in hopes of discovering answers for the vault by relying on data from the Independence. However they discover an old place known as the Heart of the Ancients that is a secret underground garden flourishing with plant life. With the newly found crops, there is hope for the upper world to thrive on their once desolate fields with these new plants' seeds. Unfortunately Mick's greediness for a gem sets off a booby trap and the group is forced to run away from a giant robot while trying to fend off attacks from Renard and his forces to keep them from getting Xyber 9.
6	"Renard's Daughter"	Phill Norwood	Martha Moran	October 23, 1999	106
The search for information on how to open the vault leads Jack, Ana, Ikira and Xyber 9 deep into King Renard's domain. However the data bank they are in search of is on the giant commandship that King Renard and his daughter, Roselyn, are currently in due to it being her birthday and her wanting to be with her father for the day. The princess notices Jack nearby and is instantly annoyed by Ana's presence so she follows them as they secretly enter the ship. She then confronts them about their presence and Jack tells her that her father is evil. Ana and Roselyn proceed to get into a small verbal battle but troops alerted by Xyber 9's access into the database arrive to arrest Jack's group. However Roselyn believes in Jack's intentions and promises to hide Xyper 9 to prevent her father from getting him but bits of the truth about her father spur her into wanting to know more, to know if once and for all if it is true.
7	"Trio"	Phill Norwood	Martha Moran	October 30, 1999	107
Jack and his allies investigate something that King Renard has been working on that Princess Roselyn noticed. Xyber 9 and Ikira identify what they find to be as The Ring of Thunder, a destructive weapon of electricity that must not form a complete ring and fall into Machestro's hands. Jack with Xyber 9, Anakonda, and Roselyn are given the task to infiltrate the area and destroy the weapon's focus lens. However Ana and Roselyn's dislike for one another cause them to argue none stop and refuse to work together, driving Jack crazy with their bickering and snide remarks.
8	"The Golden Masquerade"	Phill Norwood	Larry Brody	November 6, 1999	108
While looking for a code key in a fortress belonging to King Renard's fortress Jack, Mick and Willy find an old plane wreck where Mick discovers a treasure map to the golden idol of Tereus. While Xyber 9 protests a hunt for the treasure, Mick and Jack ignore him and go anyway, with Willy silently tagging along. However they run into an old friend of Mick's named Slick who works for Renard but does plundering on the side. He learns of the treasure map and the two sides join forces to search but Xyber 9 does not trust Slick. Eventually they find the cave of the Golden Masquerade but things are not going to be easy.
9	"The New Kingdom"	Phill Norwood	Martha Moran	November 13, 1999	109
Jack recovers an artifact known as the Seed of Light however the team starts to fall apart as everyone begins to fight due to not having one common goal. Mick is tired of being shot at and not getting a reward while Ikira tries to act as the peacemaker but ends up butting heads with Anakonda who insults everyone, causing Jack to retreat with Xyber 9 to think of a plan to unite everyone. Together everyone heads to the New Valley in hopes of recharging the Seed of Light and reuniting under a single goal. It is there they manage to resurrect an anti-Machina technology barrier, a force field that does not allow anything Machina made in.
10	"Ikira's Secret"	Phill Norwood	Mark Hoffmeier	December 4, 1999	110
During a mission into the Machina tunnels to obtain a key that will allow Jack and his band access to any of the tunnels without alerting the enemy, Jack opens a door that expose some Machina tunnel rats to the sunlight, causing them extreme pain. Upon closer inspection by Xyber 9, he reveals a viral disease within their bodies that literally burns its way out when its host has been exposed to sunlight. Ikira seems troubled and upset about judgmental remarks about the Machina being monsters. During the night, Ikira steals the key from Jack and takes off for the Machina tunnels, leading the others to take off after him, fearing he has turned against them. However Ikira returns to the Machina to reveal the truth Xyber 9 discovered, that they are not cursed but infected with a virus but Machestro captures Ikira and reveals he knows of the sunlight cure. The truth then comes out that Ikira is Machina.
11	"Ground Zero"	Phill Norwood	Eric Luke	February 24, 2007	111
Queen Tatania's forces are caught in a pincer attack due to a false message Jack intercepted. Anxious to make things right and save them, Jack goes on a solo mission into King Renard's camp to locate where the device for the jamming signal is coming from in order to allow Captain Montand to contact HMS Independence. However Renard's rail cannon is now complete, making the Independence the perfect target practice as it attempts a rescue mission for Captain Montand's men. Renard is not concerned with the loss of his own men who are caught in the line of fire at the Independence and Xyber 9 realizes that everyone in range of the blast is on ground zero. It is now a race to counter the attack.
12	"The Astral Hand"	Phill Norwood	Martha Moran and Eric Luke	February 25, 2007	112
13	"The Astral Hand"	Phill Norwood	Martha Moran	March 3, 2007	113
Part 1: With King Renard's rail cannon completed, he uses various places as target practice but finds out he has run out of Strontite explosive for the missiles. Word has it that crypts in the kingdom of Eldera has the needed substance. Fortunately Princess Roselyn overhears and relays the news to Jack whose group goes off to defend Eldera. Once there they meet a boy named Christopher whose grandfather, Albion, is the King of Eldera but find out the kingdom has fallen to very simple means, unable to put up much of a fight against Renard's forces. But the myth of the Astral Hand brings hope to save the kingdom, if Jack and the others can solve the riddle to find it first. Part 2: Trapped on the bottom of the sea with the Astral Hand, Jack with Xyber 9, Ana and Ikira try to reach the surface while elsewhere Mick and Willy do their best to defend Eldera. When cornered by Renard's troops, a disguised Miss Thorpe and Roselyn come to the duos rescue, much to Mick's delight. Unfortunately Christopher gets captured by Renard's General boasts about the Astral Hand to the enemy. To buy them time, Willy sacrifices himself to take down the enemy and Jack manages to unleash a sky island while fighting King Renard but holds back due to a pact he made with Roselyn to not kill her father. In the end Willy is revealed to be alive and Jack and Xyper 9 have gained the final code to open the Vault but Machestro manages to channel the remaining energy he needs into the Chamber of Hunters, awakening a new force at his command.
14	"Balance of Power"	Boyd Kirkland	Eric Luke	March 4, 2007	114
The Hunters have been unleashed! But Machestro and Renard aren't the only ones with new toys; Jack and his friends finally opened the vault at the New Valley, too. Jack's slowly gathering the people and weapons for a kingdom of his own, but what happens when Renard decides to attack?
15	"Anakonda's Choice"	Phill Norwood	Martha Moran	March 10, 2007	115
Anakonda starts acting strangely during a raid on one of Renard's convoys; it seems there's trouble in her homeland and even at this distance she can sense it. Not only that, but another member of her tribe shows up, looking for help. And what does Jack think of this newcomer? Let's just say it's not pretty....
16	"Infestation"	Joe Barruso	Larry Brody	March 11, 2007	116
While hunting for a magnetic disruptor in the ruins of an Ancient city, the gang finds something else entirely, something surprising. However, Machestro is plotting as per usual, so this find may have dire consequences . . .
17	"Ghost of the Ancients"	Boyd Kirkland	Martha Moran	March 17, 2007	117
While on the run from Renard, Jack and company discover an old fortress belonging to the legendary King Dragar. Looking for something to chase Renard off, Jack finds a strange and powerful suit of armor. But putting it on is one thing, controlling it is something else entirely. Maybe he should have listened to Xyber 9 this time?
18	"Marooned"	Phill Norwood	Martha Moran	March 18, 2007	118
Renard attacks the New Valley again, and this time he's brought along something special, a new Machina fighter plane with enough power to face off against Jack's Spider Fighter. But when their weapons cross, the Spider Fighter reveals a new power, sending it and the Machina plane spinning through space and time. Now, Jack, Xyber, Ikira, and the Machina pilots are stuck who knows where . . . and the only way back is to work together.
19	"The Rail Cannon"	Boyd Kirkland	Martha Moran	March 24, 2007	119
With Renard destroying Tatania's kingdom city by city, a raid on the Rail Cannon is in order. Can our heroes sabotage the giant weapon, even while Mick flirts with Ms. Thorpe through the whole trip?
20	"Eye of Darkness"	Phill Norwood	Eric Luke	March 25, 2007	120
21	"Eye of Darkness"	Joe Barruso	Eric Luke and Martha Moran	April 7, 2007	121
22	"Eye of Darkness"	Boyd Kirkland	Eric Luke	April 8, 2007	122
Part 1 (Machestro's Plan): After being constantly outmaneuvered by Jack and company, Renard finally discovers he has a spy. But why try and capture the spy when you can use them to your advantage instead? Things are about to go south for our heroes rather quickly; how will they get out of this one? Part 2 (Without Xyber 9): Xyber 9's fallen into enemy hands, but he's not exactly being cooperative. Machestro's lackey can fix that, though. Xyber's not the only one in trouble, however: Roselyn's been captured too. Can Jack still manage to save the day, even without the Xyber's help? Part 3 (The Duel): Renard is gone and now there's one final battle to be won before the world knows peace. But can Jack take on Machestro and still come back alive? You'll have to watch to find out!

== Cast ==
=== Principal voice actors ===
- René Auberjonois - Xyber 9
- Tim Curry - King Renaud
- Quinton Flynn - Mick
- Nika Futterman - Anakonda
- Tony Jay - Machestro
- Jolie Jenkins - Princess Roselyn
- Dominique Jennings - Queen Tatiana
- Tom Kane - Captain Montand
- Jason Marsden - Jack
- Christopher Marquette - Ikira
- Rodney Saulsberry - Willy
- Frank Welker - Honk

=== Additional voices ===
- Obba Babatundé
- Gregg Berger
- Victor Brandt
- Phil Buckman
- Brian George
- Jennifer Hale
- David Jeremiah
- Heidi Lenhart
- Kerrigan Mahan
- Tony Pope
- Bumper Robinson
- Neil Ross
- Kim Strauss
- Keith Szarabajka
- Jim Ward
- Tom Wyner

== Crew ==
- Jamie Simone - Casting and voice director
