= Jahzir Bruno =

American actor (born 2009)

- Born: Jahzir Kadeem Bruno; July 18, 2009 (age 17); Atlanta, Georgia, U.S.
- Occupation: Actor
- Years active: 2018–present

Jahzir Kadeem Bruno (born July 18, 2009) is an American actor. He is known for his roles in the 2020 films The Witches and The Christmas Chronicles 2 and his depiction of Clyde McBride in The Really Loud House.

== Life and career ==
Jahzir Kadeem Bruno was born on July 18, 2009, in Atlanta, Georgia. In 2020, he had his breakout role as Hero Boy in The Witches, a remake of Roald Dahl's 1983 eponymous novel. The New York Times described him as "sweetly sensitive"; the BBC thought he was "lively" and that he and co-star Octavia Spencer "were a watchable screen odd couple", but were overshadowed by Anne Hathaway, who portrays the Grand High Witch. Bruno's performance received a nomination for the NAACP Image Award for Outstanding Breakthrough Performance. That same year, Bruno played Jack in Netflix's The Christmas Chronicles 2. Deadline Hollywood stated that he "adds the required cuteness" to the film.

In 2021, Bruno was cast as Clyde McBride in the live-action movie adaption of The Loud House called A Loud House Christmas. He would later reprise the role in the live-action television spinoff titled The Really Loud House and the first half of The Loud House season six (before the voice role was recast to Jaeden White due to Bruno's commitment to the live-action series).

== Filmography ==
=== Film ===
Year	Title	Role	Notes
2020	The Witches	Hero Boy / Charlie Hansen	
2020	The Christmas Chronicles 2	Jack	

=== Television ===
Year	Title	Role	Notes
2018	Atlanta	Omari	Episode: "Barbershop"
2019	The Oath	Tommy	3 episodes
2021	A Loud House Christmas	Clyde McBride	Television film
2022	The Casagrandes	Clyde McBride (voice)	Episode: "Phantom Freakout"
2022	The Loud House	Clyde McBride (voice)	Main role (season 6)
2022–2024	The Really Loud House	Clyde McBride	Main role; 39 episodes
2023	A Really Haunted Loud House	Clyde McBride	Television film
