= Morgan McGill =

American actress

- Born: Atlanta, Georgia, United States
- Occupation: Actress
- Years active: 2017–present

Morgan Lovett McGill is an American actress and athlete. She is best known for playing Lynn Loud Jr. in the Nickelodeon comedy movie A Loud House Christmas.

== Early life ==
McGill was born in Atlanta to former Indianapolis Colts and New York Jets player Curt McGill and NCAA tennis champion Kelly Baskin McGill. She revealed it was Indiana Jones that got her inspired to be an actress. She is an avid athlete herself excelling at tennis and volleyball playing regional and national level in both. McGill also takes part in comedy with an improv groupe based throughout the southeast.

== Career ==
McGill made her on screen debut as Lynn Loud Jr. in A Loud House Christmas. Her role was later recast in The Really Loud House to Annaka Fourneret. News online was spread that a cast member of A Loud House Christmas had been the subject of being bullied online which was later revealed to be McGill. The online bullies criticized McGill's appearance and call her a fake athlete. McGill has also appeared in the television shows Lovecraft Country and The Kitty Kelley Files.

== Personal life ==
While McGill hopes to continues her acting career, she said she hopes to play tennis at her future university. She has also mentioned her interest in working in the medical field as a doctor or veterinarian.

== Filmography ==
=== Film ===
Year	Title	Role	Notes
2017	Spoiled Girl	Vivian	Short
2018	Cowforya	Savannah Haralson	Short
2018	Camera Shy	Samantha Plymouth	
2021	A Loud House Christmas	Lynn Loud Jr.	
2026	Masters of the Universe	Princess Adora / She-Ra	

=== Television ===
Year	Title	Role	Notes
2017	The Kitty Kelley Files	Young Drew Barrymore	Episode: "Drew Barrymore"
2020	Lovecraft Country	Young Girl	Episode: "Jig-a-bobo"
