= Ella and Mia Allan =

American actresses (born 2010)

- Born: Ella Sophia Allan; Mia Isabella Allan; November 14, 2010 (age 16); California, United States
- Occupation: Actresses
- Years active: 2011 - present

Ella Sophia Allan and Mia Isabella Allan (born November 14, 2010), also known as the Allan twins, are American actresses. They began acting playing the same role in several series including Sons of Anarchy (2011) and Parenthood (2012–2015). They later played the recurring roles of Ellie (also known as Elsa) and Anna Solano in Jane the Virgin (2016–2018) and the starring roles of Amy and Emma Forgerty in Single Parents (2018–2020) and Lola and Lana Loud in The Loud House's live-action adaptations of television films and series.

== Early life ==
The twins were born in Southern California on November 14, 2010. They have one younger brother, who is also an actor.

== Career ==
The Allans began acting at 6 months old playing Baby Thomas Teller in Sons of Anarchy (2011). They shared the role of Nora Braverman in Parenthood (2012–2015) and a young Marilyn Monroe in the biographical miniseries, The Secret Life of Marilyn Monroe (2015). They also appeared in several TV movies.

The Allans played Anna and Elsa "Ellie" Solano in Jane the Virgin (2016–2019). They also appeared in Young Sheldon (2018) as Bobbi Sparks. They made their debut in Single Parents (2018–2020) playing Amy and Emma Forgerty. They also voiced Ginger and Lavender Flour in Amphibia (2021).

The Allans played the roles of Lola and Lana Loud in the real-life adaptation of the animated series, The Loud House, in the Christmas television film A Loud House Christmas (2021). They reprised the roles in the series The Really Loud House (2022–2024) and in the Halloween television film A Really Haunted Loud House (2023).

== Filmography ==
=== Film ===
Year	Title	Ella's role	Mia's role	Notes
2015	How We Live	Abby Harris	Leila Harris	Television film
2017	Raised by Wolves	Beebee Gable (shared role)		Television film
2018	Most Likely To	Uncredited		Television film
2021	A Loud House Christmas	Lola Loud	Lana Loud	Television film
2023	A Really Haunted Loud House	Lola Loud	Lana Loud	Television film

=== Television ===
Year	Title	Ella's role	Mia's role	Notes
2011	Sons of Anarchy	Baby Thomas Teller (shared role)		8 episodes, uncredited
2012–2015	Parenthood	Nora Braverman (shared role)		Recurring role (season 4-6)
2015	The Secret Life of Marilyn Monroe	Young Norma Jean (shared role)		2 episodes
2016–2019	Jane the Virgin	Ellie Solano	Anna Solano	Recurring roles (season 3-5)
2018	Young Sheldon	Bobbi Sparks (shared role)		Episode: "Jiu-Jitsu, Bubble Wrap, and Yoo-Hoo"
2018	Living Biblically		Girl	Episode: "It Is Better to Give than to Receive"
2018	The Cool Kids		Avery	Episode: "Hank the Cradle Robber"
2018–2020	Single Parents	Amy Forgerty	Emma Forgerty	Main roles
2021	Amphibia	Ginger Flour (voice)	Lavender Flour (voice)	2 episodes
2022–2024	The Really Loud House	Lola Loud	Lana Loud	Main roles
