= Knight Squad =

American comedy television series

- Genre: Comedy
- Created by: Sean Cunningham & Marc Dworkin
- Starring: Owen Joyner; Daniella Perkins; Lilimar; Lexi DiBenedetto; Amarr M. Wooten; Savannah May; Kelly Perine
- Composer: Chris Alan Lee
- Country of origin: United States
- Original language: English
- No. of seasons: 2
- No. of episodes: 29

Production
- Executive producers: Sean Cunningham & Marc Dworkin; Dan Cross & David Hoge; John Beck & Ron Hart; Gigi McCreery & Perry Rein
- Producer: Patty Gary-Cox
- Camera setup: Multi-camera
- Running time: 24 minutes
- Production companies: Dworkingham Productions; Nickelodeon Productions

Original release
- Network: Nickelodeon
- Release: February 19, 2018 – April 20, 2019

Knight Squad is an American comedy television series created by Sean Cunningham and Marc Dworkin that premiered on Nickelodeon on February 19, 2018. The series, which ran for two seasons and concluded on April 20, 2019, stars Owen Joyner, Daniella Perkins, Lilimar, Lexi DiBenedetto, Amarr M. Wooten, Savannah May, and Kelly Perine.

== Premise ==
At a "magical school for knights in training" in the kingdom of Astoria, two very different students, Arc and Ciara, form a pact to keep each other's secrets and to follow their dreams of knighthood.

Arc and Ciara train with their classmates Prudence and Warwick as well as their rivals Sage and Buttercup so that they would one day be knights and defend Astoria from various threats like its ex-king Ryker and his army.

== Cast and characters ==
=== Main ===
- Owen Joyner as Arc, a drifter from Seagate who cheats and steals his way into the knight school and on to the Phoenix Squad so that he can one day liberate his homeland of Seagate from Ryker.
- Daniella Perkins as Ciara, a student who is secretly the princess of Astoria who wears a special ring given to her by pixies at Eliza's suggestion to disguise herself so that she can secretly attend knight school and be a part of Phoenix Squad
- Lilimar as Sage, a student at the school who is Ciara's rival and a member of Kraken Squad. In "Closing Knight," Sage's motivation for becoming a knight was when she at a young age was unable to do anything when the Queen of Astoria was taken by tree goblins.
- Lexi DiBenedetto as Prudence, a student who is "one-quarter giant" that is in Phoenix Squad with Arc, Ciara and Warwick. Between the end of season one and the beginning of season two, Prudence learns the secrets of Arc and the Princess as she agrees to keep quiet to keep both of them from being in trouble with the King and Sir Gareth.
- Amarr M. Wooten as Warwick, a student who is in Phoenix Squad with Arc, Ciara and Prudence, and who is considered to be the worst knight student in the school, but who later discovers that he can do magic; he is the older brother of Fizzwick; In "Love at First Knight," Warwick learns the secrets of Arc and the Princess.
- Savannah May as Buttercup, a sweet and foolish student at the school who is Sage's minion and a member of Kraken Squad
- Kelly Perine as Sir Gareth, a veteran knight and a teacher at the knight school with an eye patch, a metal left arm, and a metal left rear end cheek

=== Recurring ===
- Jason Sims-Prewitt as The King, the unnamed ruler of Astoria the very protective father of the Princess and Princess Eliza
- Seth Carr as Fizzwick, Warwick's younger brother who does odd jobs around knight school
- Fred Grandy as Wizard Hogancross, the greatest wizard in the land who serves the King, has a poor relationship with Sir Gareth, and was the creator of the force field that keeps Ryker out of Astoria

Todd Tucker also voices Slobwick, a furry creature who first appears in "A Thief in the Knight".

=== Notable guest stars ===
- Mary Passeri as Sorceress Spitzalot, the headmistress of Astoria's magic school who is willing to accept anyone with magical abilities.
- Tenzing Norgay Trainor as Jimbo, a former Phoenix Squad member
- Maria Canals-Barrera as Saffron, a potion maker and Sage's mother
- Jaheem Toombs as Sebastian, a student at Sorcery School
- Maya Le Clark as Brea, a girl who is educated by Sage
- Kira Kosarin as Kiki, a genie
- Jack Griffo as Sir Swayze, a knight and ex-student of Sir Gareth who became a knight in the kingdom of Inwood since anyone who lives in Inwood can become a knight
- Garrett Morris as Old Fizzwick, the elderly form of Fizzwick
- Geno Segers as Ryker, the former king of Astoria who was exiled for his corruption and leads an army with the intention to reclaim it while destroying some villages along the way
- Lizzy Greene as Shadow Ghost, a ghost who targeted the Princess
- Sydney Park as Princess Eliza, the older sister of the Princess who procured a special ring for her sister and led her father's army in fighting Ryker until she fell under the control of the Mark of Ryker spell
- Chris Tallman as The Wiper
- Raini Rodriguez as The Witch Doctor

== Production ==
Knight Squad received a 20-episode order from Nickelodeon in May 2017. Production on the series began in October 2017, and it premiered in February 2018. On July 27, 2018, the series was renewed for a second season of 10 episodes.

== Episodes ==
=== Series overview ===
Season	Episodes	Originally released	
Season	Episodes	First released	Last released
1	19	February 19, 2018	January 26, 2019
2	10	February 2, 2019	April 20, 2019

=== Season 1 (2018–19) ===
No. overall	No. in season	Title	Directed by	Written by	Original release date	Prod. code	U.S. viewers (millions)
1	1	"Opening Knight"	Trevor Kirschner	Sean Cunningham & Marc Dworkin	February 19, 2018	101	1.14
Arc lies his way into knight school in Astoria, by saying he is of knight blood, a requirement to attend; after stealing the Princess' tiara to pay school fees, he joins the school as a member of the Phoenix Squad, led by Ciara. Ciara is the secret identity used by the Princess of Astoria to attend knight school. She uses a magical pixie ring to transform between the Princess and Ciara. After becoming suspicious of each other, Arc and Ciara agree to help keep each other's secret so that they can pursue their shared dreams of becoming knights. Meanwhile, Sage and Buttercup try to sabotage Phoenix Squad's first quest, hoping to get them kicked out of knight school, but they fail. Guest star: Jason Sims-Prewitt
2	2	"A Knight at the Roxbury"	Trevor Kirschner	Sean Cunningham & Marc Dworkin	February 24, 2018	102	0.94
Arc and Ciara cannot agree on who should compete for the annual Roxbury Cup on behalf of the Phoenix Squad. After Arc finally gets nominated through a coin flip, Ciara nominates herself at the last minute. Arc tries to make Ciara quit by inviting the Princess; however, since quitting the competition would get Ciara kicked out of knight school, Arc and Ciara must figure out how to make it look like the Princess is there while Ciara is competing. When the King demands to speak to the Princess, Ciara must leave mid-competition to save Arc, which means that Sage later manages to win the cup for the Kraken Squad. Guest stars: Jason Sims-Prewitt, Seth Carr
3	3	"Knight in Shining Armor Day"	Trevor Kirschner	John D. Beck & Ron Hart	March 3, 2018	103	0.95
It is Armor Day in Astoria and Phoenix Squad is hosting the festivities in knight school. To avoid anyone suspecting that Arc is not from Astoria, Ciara teaches him all the Armor Day traditions; however, when Arc messes up by hiding the symbolic chocolate armor in the wrong place, Ciara and Arc must battle an angry pack rat to get the armor back in time. Meanwhile, Buttercup gives Sage a thoughtful Armor Day gift of a diorama representing how they first met, but Sage gives her nothing. After being tricked by Fizzwick, Sage risks her life to get a unicorn blossom for Buttercup, only to realize that she is allergic. Guest stars: Fred Grandy, Seth Carr
4	4	"One Magical Knight"	Trevor Kirschner	Lisa Muse Bryant	March 10, 2018	104	0.85
Sorceress Spitzalot (Mary Passeri) from the sorcery school comes to test any knight school students that may have magical powers so that she can transfer them to her magic school. Warwick tells Arc that he failed the magic spell test on purpose because if anyone found out that he had magical powers, he would be kicked out of school. However, his powers are exposed when he accidentally brings a villain to life from a painting. Prudy, who had been convinced by Sage to quit knight school, returns to help Ciara save the day. The Princess convinces the King to change the rules to let magical students like Warwick remain in knight school. Guest stars: Jason Sims-Prewitt, Mary Passeri
5	5	"The Dork Knight Returns"	Jonathan Judge	Wesley Jermaine Johnson & Scott Taylor	March 17, 2018	106	0.85
Jimbo (Tenzing Norgay Trainor), a former member of Phoenix Squad, returns to knight school after being trapped in a cave for months. He takes back his position, forcing Arc out. Later, while Ciara, Prudence, and Warwick are trying to trick Jimbo to quit knight school, Sage recruits Arc to join Kraken Squad. Arc finds out that Jimbo is plotting revenge on Phoenix Squad, and he tries to stop him, but Jimbo renders him unconscious and carries him to the cave. The rest of the Phoenix Squad comes to rescue Arc, but Jimbo traps them there as well. After escaping, they report Jimbo and he is arrested, while Arc rejoins Phoenix Squad. Guest stars: Seth Carr, Tenzing Norgay Trainor
6	6	"Tonight, Two Knight"	Trevor Kirschner	Chris Atwood	March 24, 2018	105	0.97
To make Arc and Ciara learn to get along, Sir Gareth binds them together in a magical friendship bracelet; they must work together for the bracelet to fall off. This complicates things because Ciara's older sister Princess Eliza is returning home with the Astorian army. However, Eliza does not return and instead sends a scroll saying she has left and is never returning. Ciara works with Arc to find a secret message from Princess Eliza in the scroll saying that she is actually undercover on a mission to recover the lost Armor of Astoria, and because Arc and Ciara were able to work together, the bracelet falls off. Guest stars: Jason Sims-Prewitt, Seth Carr
7	7	"A Knight's Tail"	Eric Dean Seaton	Chris Tallman	March 31, 2018	108	0.94
When Ciara asks Arc to hold her pixie ring, Arc uses it without her permission, and it transforms him into a hideous beast and stops working. Arc and Ciara visit the Pixie Queen (Brittany Ross) to ask her for help with fixing the ring, but she refuses because she has a grudge on Arc for refusing to keep his promise to save the pixie village. Arc offers to do it now and in return the Pixie Queen fixes the ring. Meanwhile, Sage wants to weaken the Phoenix Squad by manipulating Prudence and Warwick to fight over combat cards. Later, Prudence and Warwick make a pact to never let combat cards ruin their friendship again. Guest stars: Jason Sims-Prewitt, Brittany Ross
8	8	"Parent Teacher Knight"	Jody Margolin Hahn	Jennifer Keene	April 7, 2018	109	0.91
Tired of Sage pranking them all the time, Phoenix Squad reports her to Sir Gareth, who decides to expel Sage. Sir Gareth calls in Sage's mother Saffron (Maria Canals-Barrera), but Saffron casts an evil love spell on him and makes him favor Sage over the other students. After being reminded that he cannot date students' parents, Sir Gareth decides to make Sage a knight; however, Sage wants to earn knighthood on her own. Before her knighting ceremony, Sage teams up with Phoenix Squad to save Sir Gareth from Saffron's evil spell. Later, Phoenix Squad defends Sage since she did help save Sir Gareth, who decides not to expel her. Guest stars: Maria Canals-Barrera, Seth Carr
9	9	"Do the Knight Thing"	Robbie Countryman	Michael J.S Murphy & Frank O. Wolff	April 14, 2018	112	0.80
Following a magical mishap at the sorcery school, Spitzalot brings her brightest students Team Hex to stay in knight school temporarily, but Team Hex insults Phoenix Squad on arrival. The rivalry escalates when Phoenix Squad is forced to share their squad room with them. When the King orders the two groups to compete for who should remain in the school, Team Hex uses magic to cheat their way to victory; however, they are exposed by Warwick's truth spell. Meanwhile, when Sage makes fun of teaching, Sir Gareth forces her to train a group of little children aspiring to become knights; however, it goes wrong when the children use Sage's lesson against her by pranking her and Buttercup as Sir Gareth gets a good laugh out of it. Guest stars: Jason Sims-Prewitt, Mary Passeri, Jaheem Toombs, Maya Le Clark, Emma Meisel
10	10	"Wish I May, Wish I Knight"	Jody Margolin Hahn	Jennifer Keene	May 25, 2018	115	0.98
The Princess has to help her father, which means that Ciara is unable to join the treasure hunt. Later, Arc finds a genie lamp during the treasure hunt which contains a genie named Kiki (Kira Kosarin) who helps the Princess out; however, things go wrong when the genie lamp gets into Sage's hands, who wishes to be the Princess of Astoria. Special guest star: Kira Kosarin Guest star: Jason Sims-Prewitt
11	11	"Working on the Knight Moves"	Wendy Faraone	Wesley Jermaine Johnson & Scott Taylor	June 9, 2018	116	0.71
Hot shot knight Sir Swayze of Inwood (Jack Griffo) shows up in Astoria and opens up his own academy, which Sir Gareth is against as he had expelled Sir Swayze for his shortcuts and the fact that Inwood will make anyone a knight. Due to Sir Swayze's talents, Arc, Ciara, Sage, and Buttercup want to learn some of his moves, but they cannot let Sir Gareth find out. However, things go wrong when the Phoenix Squad and Sir Swayze reanimate a magical mummy. Sir Gareth shows up and saves them, while at the same time finding out what has been going on. Special guest star: Jack Griffo Guest stars: Garrett Morris, Jason Sims-Prewitt, Seth Carr
12	12	"A Thief in the Knight"	Trevor Kirschner	Sean W. Cunningham & Marc Dworkin and John D. Beck & Ron Hart	June 16, 2018	110–111	0.84
After Sir Gareth and Hogancross (Fred Grandy) express disappointment in the students being unprepared for a Ryker drill where Sir Gareth posed as Ryker's minion Commander Amballa (Jessie Graff), Ciara tells Arc about how Ryker (Geno Segers) was the king of Astoria until he was overthrown and banished, with Hogancross setting up the dragon crystals which put up a barrier so that Ryker and his forces cannot get in. Arc convinces Ciara to show him the crystals; however, when a crystal goes missing, Arc is suspected of taking it as the barrier starts to weaken, enabling Ryker's forces to invade the knight school. Later, it is discovered that Slobwick, Fizzwick's pet, had snatched the crystal. Arc and Ciara recover the crystal and reactivate the barrier. After the King thanks the students for repelling Ryker's forces, Arc expresses disappointment that his father has not responded to his victory messages; however, Arc's father Zander (Jamie Kaler) shows up and wants to take Arc home. Guest stars: Fred Grandy, Jessie Graff, Jason Sims-Prewitt, Seth Carr, Geno Segers, Jamie Kaler
13	13	"Take Me Home to Knight"	Robbie Countryman	Lisa Muse Bryant	September 22, 2018	113	0.77
While wanting to bring his son Arc home so that he can stop pretending to be a knight, Zander ropes him in a scheme that would involve ransoming the king. Guest stars: Jamie Kaler, Jason Sims-Prewitt, Cooper Mothersbaugh
14	14	"A Total Knightmare"	Jean Sagal	Chris Atwood	September 29, 2018	114	0.67
Knight School begins its quest assignments. Worried that his fears will hinder the Phoenix Squad, Warwick uses Fearless Fairies to get rid of his fears which also affects the Phoenix Squad's mission. Guest star: Seth Carr
15	15	"Fight for Your Knight to Party"	Robbie Countryman	Chris Tallman	October 6, 2018	117	0.69
Ciara wants to make a cake so that her Princess form can give it to her father the King. In order to make the cake, Phoenix Squad enlists the help of the incarcerated Jimbo who secretly has a recipe for revenge. Guest stars: Jason Sims-Prewitt, Seth Carr, Tenzing Norgay Trainor
16	16	"Fright Knight"	Jonathan Judge	Nora Sullivan	October 20, 2018	107	0.68
The Princess defies her father by going to a Party of Darkness. The Shadow Ghost (Lizzy Greene) appears and plans to possess the Princess. Now the Phoenix Squad must work to defend the Princess from the Shadow Ghost Guest stars: Lizzy Greene, Jimmy Bellinger, Seth Carr, Jason Sims-Prewitt
17	17	"Little Knight Lies"	Eric Dean Seaton	Nora Sullivan	January 12, 2019	118	0.62
Guest stars: Jason Sims-Prewitt, Nikki Tomlinson
18	18	"End of the Knight – Part 1"	Trevor Kirschner	Sean W. Cunningham & Marc Dworkin	January 19, 2019	119	0.49
A wounded Princess Eliza returns to Astoria to inform her father that Ryker is after the Armor of Astoria. As Hogancross and Sir Gareth want the students to find a way to disable the Armor of Astoria before it can be used by Ryker to cross the forcefield protecting Astoria. While Ciara and Arc go on a secret quest to get the Armor of Astoria before Ryker's forces can find it, Prudence and Warwick compete against Sage and Buttercup with comical results. When Ciara and Arc find the Armor of Astoria, they work to defend it from Ryker's men. When Eliza shows up during the battle, Ciara is shocked when she discovers that her sister had secretly defected to Ryker's side where she considers Ryker a better ruler as Ryker comes into view to claim victory. Guest stars: Sydney Park, Fred Grandy, Jason Sims-Prewitt, Seth Carr, Geno Segers
19	19	"End of the Knight – Part 2"	Trevor Kirschner	Sean W. Cunningham & Marc Dworkin	January 26, 2019	120	0.63
After making a retreat to Astoria, Ciara doubts that she can help defeat Ryker after seeing Eliza on his side and discards her pixie ring. When Ryker attacks, he takes control of Hogancross, Sir Gareth, and the rest of the knights using the Mark of Ryker spell. The Princess notices the Mark of Ryker on Eliza's hand as the King provides the Princess and Arc with a distraction to get away. Meanwhile, Fizzwick persuades Prudence, Warwick, Sage, and Buttercup to work together to find a spell to defeat the Armor of Astoria. After some persuasion from Arc, the Princess becomes Ciara again and fights Eliza. The rest of the students show up with weapons enchanted by a spell-removal enchantment cast by Warwick as they free Eliza, Hogancross, Sir Gareth, and the other knights from the Mark of Ryker. After Arc knocks Ryker to the ground, the others remove the spell from the Armor of Astoria as Hogancross teleports Ryker away. After the King is freed from the dungeon, Sir Gareth thanks his students and gives them a day off....which isn't really going to give them as there are other threats to Astoria out there. In the final scene, Prudence finds the secret passage to the Princess' bedroom and runs into Ciara there. Guest stars: Sydney Park, Fred Grandy, Jason Sims-Prewitt, Seth Carr, Geno Segers

=== Season 2 (2019) ===
No. overall	No. in season	Title	Directed by	Written by	Original release date	Prod. code	U.S. viewers (millions)
20	1	"A Knight to Remember"	Trevor Kirschner	Sean W. Cunningham & Marc Dworkin	February 2, 2019	201	0.81
When Prudence finds out about Ciara being the Princess and Arc not being of dragonblood, they use a memory stick on her that also forgets that they are friends. Now Arc and Ciara must work to regain Prudence's memories and make sure she doesn't blow their secret. Meanwhile, Sage gets jealous that Sir Gareth pairs up Warwick and Buttercup on an egg-caring assignment and accidentally loses Buttercup's egg. Guest stars: Jason Sims Prewitt, Seth Carr, Chris Tallman
21	2	"Love at First Knight"	Trevor Kirschner	Gigi McCreery & Perry Rein	February 16, 2019	202	0.63
Guest star: Paris Smith
22	3	"Mid-Knight in the Garden of Good and Evil"	Wendy Faraone	Angela Yarbrough	February 23, 2019	203	0.59
Guest stars: Jason Sims-Prewitt, Seth Carr, Maya Le Clark
23	4	"In the Gill of the Knight"	Lynn McCracken	Jennifer Keene	March 2, 2019	204	0.58
Guest star: Seth Carr
24	5	"The Knight Stuff"	Robbie Countryman	Chris Atwood	March 9, 2019	205	0.54
When Sir Gareth falls ill, Warwick's father Sir Johnwick becomes the substitute teacher. Wanting to impress his father and make him proud, Warwick decides to use his magic during training; however, much to Warwick's dismay, his father fails him and tells him that knights never use magic and that he is an embarrassment for the family name. Later, Warwick tries to trick his father by using magic on everyone else to mess with their coordination so it looks like he is doing very well in the training without magic. However, his father becomes suspicious and uses a crystal to scan for active magic, revealing that everyone except Warwick has a magical aura, further making him disappointed in him. Warwick decides it is best to get rid of his magic and visits the Witch Doctor. As he is about to lose his magic, Arc, Ciara, and Prudence arrive and attempt to rescue him, but the Witch Doctor uses her magic to place them in chairs they cannot get out of. Sir Johnwick arrives shortly after to rescue Warwick and they both use magic to defeat the Witch Doctor. Sir Johnwick reveals to Warwick that when he was in knight school, there was no magic allowed and he had to keep his powers a secret. Meanwhile, Sage and Buttercup try to nurse Sir Gareth back to full health, but they end up figuring out that he is faking sick in order to get a day off due to fatigue since there is a no days off policy. The King later agrees to give everyone except his guards two days off at the end of each week. Special guest star: Raini Rodriguez Guest stars: Jason Sims-Prewitt, Seth Carr, Regi Davis, Michael Carbonaro
25	6	"Knight of the Living Dead"	Jody Margolin Hahn	Chris Tallman	March 16, 2019	207	0.56
Guest stars: Thomas Lennon, Fred Grandy
26	7	"Knight Glider"	Jonathan Judge	Wesley Jermaine Johnson & Scott Taylor	March 30, 2019	206	0.42
Guest stars: Jason Sims-Prewitt, Seth Carr, Greg Perrow
27	8	"Two Wrongs Don't Make a Knight"	Wendy Faraone	Nora Sullivan	April 6, 2019	208	0.59
Guest stars: Jason Sims-Prewitt, Seth Carr
28	9	"Election Knight"	David Kendall	Michael J.S. Murphy & Frank O. Wolff	April 13, 2019	209	0.49
Prudence’s quirky ideas while running for Class Ruler has her friends in the Phoenix Squad worried that she will embarrass herself, so they secretly take over the campaign. Meanwhile, Buttercup makes Sage payback for her pranks so she can become class ruler instead of Selwyn or Prudy. Guest stars: Jason Sims-Prewitt, Seth Carr
29	10	"Closing Knight"	Trevor Kirschner	Sean W. Cunningham & Marc Dworkin	April 20, 2019	210	0.52
An unexpected attack nearly harms the King and the students' personal weapons have gone missing causing Sir Gareth to do the final exams where Phoenix Squad, Kraken Squad, and Unicorn Squad must find the hidden shields and line them up in order to pass. If anyone gets knocked down, they are eliminated. This competition is fierce until only Ciara and Sage are left where it was revealed that they have had a mutual experience of the day when the Queen was taken by tree goblins. Ciara was able to defeat Sage and find the final shield to score victory for Phoenix Squad. Meanwhile, Fizzwick wants to resign working as Knight School's janitor and become a student much to the dismay of Sir Gareth. After some unexpected janitor moves that Fizzwick uses, Sir Gareth stated that he learned some abilities on the job. On the day of the knighting, Sage and Buttercup have gotten jobs as meat vendors. Sage is the first to see the attacker and alerts Phoenix Squad as Sage incapacitates the attacker. In order to prove that everyone deserves a chance to be a knight, Ciara reveals her true identity as the Princess to everyone which the King figured out sometime before. Arc also comes clean about his background which the King accepts. By the final scene, Sage and Buttercup join Arc, Ciara, Prudence, and Warwick into being knighted. Guest stars: Jason Sims-Prewitt, Seth Carr

== Ratings ==
Viewership and ratings per season of Knight Squad
Season	Episodes	First aired		Last aired		Avg. viewers (millions)
Season	Episodes	Date	Viewers (millions)	Date	Viewers (millions)	Avg. viewers (millions)
1	19	February 19, 2018	1.14	January 26, 2019	0.63	0.81
2	10	February 2, 2019	0.81	April 20, 2019	0.52	0.57
