= Jonathan Judge =

American director and television producer

- Occupations: Director; television producer
- Years active: 1996–present

Jonathan Judge is an American director and television producer. He has directed episodes for a number of children's television series namely Blue's Clues, LazyTown, Ned's Declassified School Survival Guide, Big Time Rush, The Naked Brothers Band, Imagination Movers, The Fresh Beat Band, Zeke and Luther, and The Really Loud House. His few credits outside the children's television field include directing the pilot episode of the Comedy Central series Tosh.0 and the Current TV series Bar Karma. As a producer, he has worked on Nickelodeon's U-Pick Live and the pre-shows for the 2009 and 2010 Nickelodeon Kids' Choice Awards.

== Filmography ==
=== Director ===
- Blue's Clues – 2003–2004 – 2 episodes
- Blue's Room – 2004 – 1 episode
- Ned's Declassified School Survival Guide – 2006 – 1 episode
- LazyTown – 2005–2007 – 12 episodes
- Out of Jimmy's Head – 2007 – 1 episode
- Johnny and the Sprites – 2008 – 3 episodes
- Imagination Movers – 2008 – 4 episodes
- The Naked Brothers Band – 2008–2009 – 11 episodes
- Tosh.0 – 2009 – 1 episode
- The Fresh Beat Band – 2009–2011 – 13 episodes
- Big Time Rush – 2010–2013 – 16 episodes
- Zeke and Luther – 2011 – 2 episodes
- Bar Karma – 2012 – 5 episodes
- Supah Ninjas – 2011–2012 – 4 episodes
- Level Up – 2012 – 1 episode
- Fred 3: Camp Fred – 2012 – TV movie
- See Dad Run – 2012–2014 – 6 episodes
- Fred: The Show – 2012 – 11 episodes
- Marvin Marvin – 2013 – 1 episode
- Instant Mom – 2013–2015 – 9 episodes
- Swindle – 2013 – TV movie
- The Thundermans – 2013–2018 – 23 episodes
- The Haunted Hathaways – 2014 – 2 episodes
- Nicky, Ricky, Dicky & Dawn – 2014–2015 – 5 episodes
- 100 Things to Do Before High School – 2014–2016 – 7 episodes
- Bella and the Bulldogs – 2015–2016 – 4 episodes
- Dog with a Blog – 2015 – 2 episodes
- Sigmund and the Sea Monsters – 2016 – 1 episode
- Gortimer Gibbon's Life on Normal Street – 2016 – 1 episode
- School of Rock – 2016–2018 – 10 episodes
- Life in Pieces – 2017–2019 – 5 episodes
- Young Sheldon – 2018 – 1 episode
- Knight Squad – 2018–2019 – 3 episodes
- The Cool Kids – 2018–2019 – 3 episodes
- Cousins for Life – 2018–2019 – 5 episodes
- Prince of Peoria – 2018–2019 – 2 episodes
- All That – 2019 – 8 episodes
- The Expanding Universe of Ashley Garcia – 2020 – 1 episode
- Outmatched – 2020 – 2 episodes
- Mr. Iglesias – 2020 – 3 episodes
- Punky Brewster – 2021 – 3 episodes
- A Loud House Christmas – 2021 – TV Movie
- Warped! – 2022 – 4 episodes
- The Really Loud House – 2022–2024 – 20 episodes
- A Really Haunted Loud House – 2023 – TV Movie
- Hollywood Arts – 2026 – 3 episodes

=== Producer ===
- Sigmund and the Sea Monsters – 2016–2017 – co-executive producer
- Punky Brewster – 2021 – executive producer
- A Loud House Christmas - executive producer
- Warped! – 2022 – executive producer
- The Really Loud House – 2022–2024 – executive producer
- A Really Haunted Loud House – 2023 – executive producer
- Hollywood Arts – 2026 – executive producer
