= A Really Haunted Loud House =

2023 American television film

- Paramount+ release poster
- Based on: The characters by Chris Savino
- Teleplay by: Tony Gama-Lobo & Rebecca May and Tim Hobert
- Story by: Tony Gama-Lobo & Rebecca May
- Directed by: Jonathan Judge
- Starring: Wolfgang Schaeffer; Jahzir Bruno; Lexi DiBenedetto; Eva Carlton; Sophia Woodward; Catherine Ashmore Bradley; Annaka Fourneret; Aubin Bradley; Lexi Janicek; Mia Allan; Ella Allan; August Michael Peterson; Jolie Jenkins; Brian Stepanek
- Composer: Nick Urata
- Country of origin: United States
- Original language: English

Production
- Executive producers: Jonathan Judge; Michael Rubiner
- Producers: Don Dunn; Melanie Kirk
- Production locations: Albuquerque, New Mexico
- Cinematography: Brandon Mastrippolito
- Editor: Jeff Wright
- Running time: 72 minutes
- Production company: Nickelodeon Movies

Original release
- Network: Nickelodeon; Paramount+
- Release: September 28, 2023

Related
- The Really Loud House; A Loud House Christmas (2021)

A Really Haunted Loud House is a 2023 American Halloween television film based on the television series The Really Loud House. It is the second live-action work and third film in the overall franchise, following The Loud House Movie (2021) and A Loud House Christmas (2021). The film was directed by Jonathan Judge (co-executive producer and primary director of The Really Loud House) from a teleplay written by Tony Gama-Lobo, Rebecca May, and The Really Loud House developer and co-executive producer Tim Hobert, based on a story conceived by Gama-Lobo and May. Judge additionally serves as an executive producer of the film alongside Michael Rubiner, while Don Dunn and Melanie Kirk serve as producers. The film stars Wolfgang Schaeffer, Jahzir Bruno, Lexi DiBenedetto, Eva Carlton, Sophia Woodward, Catherine Ashmore Bradley, Annaka Fourneret, Aubin Bradley, Mia Allan, Ella Allan, Lexi Janicek, August Michael Peterson, Jolie Jenkins, and Brian Stepanek, reprising their roles from the live-action series, with Gavin Maddox Bergman, Trinity Jo-Li Bliss, Mateo Castel, Nolan Maddox, and Kevin Chamberlin in supporting roles. It was announced on April 4, 2023, alongside the second season of The Really Loud House and The Casagrandes Movie.

The film was originally planned to premiere on October 6, 2023 on Nickelodeon and Paramount+, but was later rescheduled to September 28, 2023. The events of the film take place between the first and second seasons of The Really Loud House.

== Plot ==
On Halloween, Lincoln Loud and his best friend Clyde McBride find themselves conflicted as they decide between trick-or-treating and the signature Loud Family Spooktacular or attending a Halloween party hosted by Xander Coddington, the cool new kid at school and social media influencer. Lincoln and Clyde make the final decision to skip the Spooktacular and head to Xander's Halloween party, which disappoints his family. Though things get complicated when Rita decides to serve toothbrushes due to her worries about her family's teeth problems instead of candy, inciting the wrath of some children in light of her children's cavities. However, Xander and his friends have some tricks up their sleeves and soon decide to terrorize The Loud House. Lincoln, his family, and Clyde must work together to defend their house and rescue Halloween.

== Cast ==
- Wolfgang Schaeffer as Lincoln Loud
- Jahzir Bruno as Clyde McBride
- Lexi DiBenedetto as Lori Loud
- Eva Carlton as Leni Loud
- Sophia Woodward as Luna Loud
- Catherine Ashmore Bradley as Luan Loud
- Annaka Fourneret as Lynn Loud Jr.
- Aubin Bradley as Lucy Loud
- Mia Allan as Lana Loud
- Ella Allan as Lola Loud
- Lexi Janicek as Lisa Loud
- August Michael Peterson as Lily Loud
- Jolie Jenkins as Rita Loud
- Brian Stepanek as:
  - Lynn Loud Sr.
  - Voice of Todd (uncredited)
- Gavin Maddox Bergman as Liam Hunnicutt
- Trinity Jo-Li Bliss as Stella Zhau
- Mateo Castel as Zach Gurdle
- Nolan Maddox as Rusty Spokes
- Kevin Chamberlin as Phillip "Flip" Fillipini
- Martín Fajardo as Xander Coddington
- Shylo Molina as Johnny
- Anthony Hord as Paul Coddington
- Samantha Sandoval as Student
- Leah Hopkins as Little Red Riding Mom
- Jeff Pride as Dr. Miller
- Sreedevi Mina as Barbara
- Wes Martinez as Mailman Bob
- Mason Ugarte as Neighborhood Kid 2
- Summer Schaeffer as Jenna
- Lissette Nichols as Xander's Mom

== Production ==
The film was officially announced on April 4, 2023. The cast of the film was later announced. Filming began on February 13, 2023 under the working title A Very Loud Halloween. Production on the film completed on April 11, 2023 in Albuquerque, New Mexico.

== Soundtrack ==
No.	Title	Artist(s)	Length
1.	"Spooky Night"	Sophia Woodward, Lexi DiBenedetto, Eva Carlton, Catherine Ashmore Bradley, Annaka Fourneret, Aubin Bradley, Mia Allan, Ella Allan, Lexi Janicek, and Jolie Jenkins	2:44
2.	"I Want Candy"	Sophia Woodward, Wolfgang Schaeffer, Jahzir Bruno, Lexi DiBenedetto, Eva Carlton, Catherine Ashmore Bradley, Annaka Fourneret, Aubin Bradley, Mia Allan, Ella Allan, Lexi Janicek	1:51

== Release ==
A Really Haunted Loud House was originally planned to premiere on October 6, 2023 on Nickelodeon and Paramount+, but was later rescheduled to September 28, 2023.

== Reception ==
=== Critical ===
Jennifer Green of Common Sense Media gave the film a 3-out-of-5 star rating, stating that the Loud family and Lincoln's friends "fulfill stereotypes", but the humor "will likely hit home for the film's target audience".

=== Ratings ===
On its cable television debut, the special received 131,000 viewers, earning a 0.04 P2+ rating. In the 18–49 age demographic, it received 52,800 viewers, and another 0.04 rating. The film has a score of 5.1 on IMDb based on 260 reviews.
