= Lincoln Loud =

Fictional character from The Loud House

- The Loud House character
- First appearance: "Bathroom Break!!" (2014)
- Created by: Chris Savino
- Based on: Chris Savino's childhood
- Designed by: Chris Savino
- Voiced by: Sean Ryan Fox (2014); Grant Palmer (2016); Collin Dean (2016–2018); Jackson Petty (Singing voice in "Really Loud Music", 2018); Tex Hammond (2018–2020); Asher Bishop (2020–2022); Bentley Griffin (2022–2024); Sawyer Cole (2023–2026); Nick A. Fisher (2025-present)
- Portrayed by: Wolfgang Schaeffer (A Loud House Christmas, The Really Loud House, and A Really Haunted Loud House); Justin Allan (young, "Heart and Soul")

In-universe information
- Full name: Lincoln Albert Loud
- Alias: The Man with the Plan
- Nickname: Linc
- Species: Human
- Gender: Male
- Family: Lynn Loud Sr. (father); Rita Loud (mother); Lori Loud (oldest sister); Leni Loud (older sister); Luna Loud (older sister); Luan Loud (older sister); Lynn Loud Jr. (older sister); Lucy Loud (younger sister); Lana Loud (younger sister); Lola Loud (younger sister); Lisa Loud (younger sister); Lily Loud (youngest sister)
- Relatives: Leonard Loud (paternal grandfather); Albert Reynolds (maternal grandfather); Myrtle Reynolds (maternal step-grandmother); Ruth (maternal great-aunt); Lance Loud (paternal uncle); Sharon Loud (paternal aunt by marriage); Shane Loud (older paternal cousin); Shelby Loud (paternal cousin); Shiloh Loud (younger paternal cousin); Duke of Loch Loud (paternal ancestor); Lucille Loud (paternal ancestor)
- Home: 1216 Franklin Ave, Royal Woods, Michigan
- Nationality: American

Lincoln Albert Loud is a fictional character and the main protagonist of Nickelodeon's The Loud House franchise. Loosely based on series creator Chris Savino's childhood, Lincoln is the middle-aged sixth child and only son of the eponymous Loud family. The character has been voiced by numerous child actors throughout the series' run due to them aging out of the role, notably Grant Palmer, Collin Dean, and Asher Bishop. Lincoln was portrayed by Wolfgang Schaeffer in the live action media.

Lincoln first appeared in the series' pilot created by Savino and released by Nickelodeon, which was later picked up for a 13-episode series. Lincoln is the focus of the series, which revolves around his chaotic everyday life as the 6th child and only son in a large family of eleven children, in the fictional town of Royal Woods in Michigan, US.

The character has received universally positive reception, with multiple actors who played him having been nominated for awards as a result of the character's popularity. Though, there have been criticisms of punching-bag treatment of the character in both old and new seasons through the series.

== Role ==
Lincoln is an 11-year-old (12-year-old from season 5 onward and in The Really Loud House) boy with white hair who is the middle child and the only son in the Loud family. Lincoln has a passion for comic books, especially his favorite superhero, Ace Savvy, who has a playing card theme, as well as secret agent David Steele. Lincoln is also the family nerd along with Lisa. He is also, however, the primary leader of his ten sisters, as he typically plans schemes, strategies, and "operations" for better convenience, as well as to help others, that the girls more often than not follow. Lincoln has other talents, including cooking, playing video games, performing magic tricks, and coaching his younger sister Lola to prepare her for her pageants. Lincoln wears an orange polo shirt, blue jeans, gray socks, and white sneakers with three red stripes on each pair.

Lincoln often breaks the fourth wall by talking to the audience about living with all of his sisters and considers himself the "man with a plan." He tries to give helpful advice concerning sibling relationships. For the first four seasons, Lincoln attended Royal Woods Elementary School with his younger sisters Lucy, Lana, Lola, and Lisa and was a 5th grader there.

In "The Loudest Thanksgiving", it is revealed that Lincoln is vulnerable to tryptophan which causes him to fall asleep before Thanksgiving dessert is served.

In "Schooled!", Lincoln starts attending Royal Woods Middle School and transitions to 6th grade. As of that episode, Lincoln attends school with his older sister Lynn.

== Development ==
=== Conception and creation ===
Chris Savino grew up fascinated by newspaper comic strips and cartoons, with notable examples including Peanuts, Polly and Her Pals, Krazy Kat, Pogo, (Note: The creators of said comic strips, Charles M. Schulz, Cliff Sterrett, Geo Herriman, and Walt Kelly, respectively, served as the points of inspiration for the names of the Loud family's pets.) Dennis the Menace, MAD Magazine, The Adventures of Rocky and Bullwinkle and Friends, Underdog, Popeye, Looney Tunes, and the works of Jay Ward. By his senior year of high school, Savino learned about the animation industry and immersed himself in every animation book he could find at his local libraries before encountering the 1990 cartoon Big House Blues at an animation festival. Upon learning that Big House Blues had spawned a series in the form of The Ren & Stimpy Show, Savino mailed a letter to the series' creator, John Kricfalusi, which secured him an opportunity to join the series' staff.

After spending twenty-two years of his career at various animation studios, including Spümcø, Nickelodeon Animation Studio, Cartoon Network Studios, and Disney Television Animation, Savino was introduced to the Nickelodeon Animated Shorts Program by executive Jenna Boyd in 2013. His contract stated that he had the opportunity to pitch three ideas as a 2 1/2-minute short for the program, out of which one would be picked. The selected idea ended up being the one involving a big family— this pitch specifically involved an anthropomorphic humanoid rabbit with 25 sisters (a reference to how rabbits give birth to large litters) dealing with the chaos of an extensively large immediate family. The original premise of the short involved the protagonist (at the time named Warren, a reference to rabbit warrens) trying to escape the house without encountering his sisters, who would inevitably intend to interfere with the outfit he had chosen for the day. Upon realizing that the premise would not be relatable for children who don't have siblings, Savino changed the premise so it would be about Warren trying to reach the bathroom after holding it until the last minute. Savino had proposed making the characters rabbits because he had come fresh off the production of the human-focused Kick Buttowski: Suburban Daredevil and because "standards and practices is [sic] typically stricter with human characters", but Boyd instead suggested for him to make them human, considering that to make it more likely to get his pitch sold. Initially, Savino disagreed and also considered making the characters mice, with Lincoln's prototype name in this concept being Milton Fields. He ultimately followed Boyd's advice of making them humans after connecting the idea of the story he was trying to tell with his own experiences growing up in a large family. The original concept would later go on to be revisited in the Season 3 episode "White Hare" as a dream that Lincoln has upon encountering a family of rabbits in the forest.

After retooling his concept art of the short's protagonist so it depicted a human, Savino took inspiration from his own life to make the core aspects of the family fall into place. After Savino had narrowed Warren's twenty-five sisters down to ten (reflective of how he grew up as the ninth of ten children), which he deemed to be much more manageable, he gave them all names beginning with L, taken from various parts of his life. Lincoln was the last of the main cast to receive his name, earning it from E Lincoln Avenue in Royal Oak, Michigan, the street that Savino grew up on as a child. While the short had always been titled "The Loud House," the name was initially only in reference to the chaotic nature of a family of that size. A Nickelodeon employee named Scott Kreamer suggested that the family's name be "Loud," which Savino caught onto, noting how it would give the siblings alliterative names. The Loud family having an alliterative naming theme was further inspired by writer Karla Sakas Shropshire, who grew up with three siblings, all having names starting with K. Lincoln's prototype, Warren, later went on to become the design inspiration for his stuffed rabbit, Bun-Bun.

Savino's initial pitch was approved for pilot production on January 30, 2014. On June 6, 2014, the initial pilot of The Loud House was picked up for a thirteen-episode series. Savino loosely based Lincoln on himself and his own experiences growing up in a large family, using his personal life experiences as the foundation of the series' core elements. While the series was not intended to be autobiographical on Savino's part, many of the writers (particularly those who had siblings themselves) gave input on things that happened to them as kids, which often sprouted into episodes with Lincoln as the central focus where he would figure out ways to resolve his sisters' issues. During the development of the series, the writing staff took heavy inspiration from The Brady Bunch, primarily due to its similar focus on the chaos held by a large family and the heart shared by all of its members.

=== Characterization ===
Taking inspiration from the Peanuts cast, Savino opted to make Lincoln adopt the maturity necessary to solve his problems on his own, leaving him primarily independent of his parents. His initial idea was to have Lincoln speak down to the audience, teaching viewers how to survive in a big family like his own; upon realizing that not everybody has siblings (let alone as many as Lincoln), Savino retooled Lincoln's primary gimmick into inviting the audience into his world, showing what his life is like with ten sisters. Savino has described Lincoln's character as the polar opposite of his personality, referring to him as "the type of kid who always has a plan", elaborating on such by saying that "if there's something that he wants, and he knows that he has 10 siblings who are basically obstacles, then he's going to do what it takes to get what he wants." The first season had Lincoln as the primary focus to lay the groundwork for the series' basic concept of Lincoln being crammed into a small house with his large family. Beginning as early as the second season, the series gradually shifted its focus more onto Lincoln's sisters than specifically onto Lincoln himself to delve deeper into their personalities and expand the series' universe. As this change came into effect, Savino made it so that audiences would not fear that Lincoln would be missed; citing the episode "For Bros About to Rock" as an example of an early episode that brought one of his sisters into the spotlight, Savino described the process of making the sisters more complex and multi-faceted as having the effect of making Lincoln a complex and relatable hero.

Lincoln's fourth voice actor, Asher Bishop, has described the character as "energetic, enthusiastic, and [having] an ever-optimistic outlook on life". Bishop also highlighted how Lincoln is always trying to negotiate his relationship with his sisters, and although he frequently messes up, he ultimately learns from his mistakes. He has also gone on to say that the central theme of The Loud House Movie, which is that being special is not necessary to grab people's attention, has resonated with him the longest due to Lincoln's highly relatable character arc in the film, where he goes from feeling highly insecure about his largely unrecognized and quasi-black sheep status to accepting his hidden talent of always keeping his family together, no matter the circumstances.

Fox News has described Lincoln's lifelong predicament of being the middle child between five older sisters and five younger sisters as the foundation of him learning to always stay a step ahead in order to survive his household. They have also acknowledged that Lincoln "sometimes gets a little too much attention from his sisters" in various ways, but ultimately loves them and is always willing to help them. Variety has stated that Lincoln always plans ahead to stay one step ahead of the chaos of his family, though his adventures always begin with the question of whether or not his plans will be effective.

=== Casting ===
All of Lincoln's voice actors have been coached by Tony Gonzales. Lincoln was voiced by Sean Ryan Fox in the series' television pilot "Bathroom Break!!". For the series proper, Grant Palmer voiced the character for the first 22 episodes of the first season. Collin Dean took up the role from the episodes "One of the Boys" until "House of Lies", (Note: Dean is listed as the voice of Lincoln in the credits for the episode "Game Boys", but his successor, Tex Hammond, confirmed that he had voiced Lincoln in that episode instead.) with Jackson Petty providing Lincoln's singing voice briefly in Dean's penultimate episode, "Really Loud Music". On September 20, 2018, Tex Hammond, son of regular series voice actress Grey Griffin, announced that he would be taking up the role of Lincoln, with his first episode being "Game Boys". On October 24, 2019, Griffin announced on Facebook that Hammond had finished his tenure voicing Lincoln, with his final episode playing the character, "Room and Hoard", airing the following year. Two months later, another regular voice actor on the series, Andre Robinson, announced on an Instagram Q&A that Asher Bishop would succeed Hammond as the voice of Lincoln, which he would do from the episodes "Wheel and Deal" until "Flip This Flip", in addition to voicing him in the franchise's first feature-length film, The Loud House Movie. Bentley Griffin began voicing Lincoln in the video game Nickelodeon All-Star Brawl and would later go on to voice him in the series, succeeding Bishop, from the episodes "Save Royal Woods!" until "Can't Lynn Them All", although he would go on to voice Lincoln one last time in the 2024 film No Time to Spy. Sawyer Cole then took up the role of Lincoln from the episodes "One in a Million" until "Stage Combat" and also voiced him in the film A Loud House Christmas Movie: Naughty or Nice. Since the episode "Summer Camp: Ticked Off", Lincoln has been voiced by Nick A. Fisher.

Wolfgang Schaeffer portrayed Lincoln in the 2021 live-action television film A Loud House Christmas, the 2022 television series The Really Loud House and the 2023 television film A Really Haunted Loud House. In the episode "Heart and Soul", a young Lincoln was portrayed by Justin Allan (brother of regular series cast members Ella and Mia Allan) in a flashback. Upon being cast as Lincoln in A Loud House Christmas, Schaeffer opted to portray the character as similarly to a cartoon character as he could, while also trying to innovate his own characterization to differentiate his Lincoln from the animated version. For the film, Schaeffer dyed his hair to give Lincoln his signature albinism; however, the hair dye caused him to go partially bald, so when The Really Loud House began production, he wore a wig for the role instead.

== Reception ==
The character of Lincoln Loud has received a universally positive critical reception, with several actors who have played him receiving nominations for awards because of their role as the character. Grant Palmer won a Young Artist Award and one Behind the Voice Actors Award (along with being nominated for two more) and was nominated for a Young Entertainer Award for the role in 2017, Collin Dean was nominated for a Behind the Voice Actors Award in 2018, Asher Bishop was nominated for an Emmy in 2022, and Wolfgang Schaeffer was nominated for a Kids' Choice Award twice; once in 2023, and once in 2024.

A 2017 study by the University of Turku centered on the formation of adult fandoms around animated series aimed at children and adolescents (with The Loud House as the test subject) concluded that based on questionnaires handed out to six adult men at the average age of 21.2 years, Lincoln was the second-most-popular character among the periphery demographic (tied with his sister, Luan), as well as the series' most relatable character by a small margin. On May 17, 2022, Nickelodeon declared June 5 as National Lincoln Loud Day to celebrate the character's popularity, as well as to commemorate the initial airing of the series' pilot on that date in 2014. Lincoln's popularity among audiences caused him to become the first animated character to appear as a mystery celebrity on Nickelodeon's Unfiltered. Lincoln was also featured as the answer to a question on the September 20, 2022, episode of Želite li da postanete milioner?, the Serbian version of Who Wants to Be a Millionaire?, as well as part of a clue for a question featuring The Loud House as the answer on the April 28, 2023, episode of Jeopardy!. In May 2017, Lincoln Loud (along with his best friend, Clyde McBride) was featured on the front cover of Variety as an example of diverse characters in children's television.

Comics Beat praised Lincoln's role as a protagonist in depicting "the lone middle boy adrift in a sea of ten sisters, [to] show the realities of coming of age in [modern] America," as he "subtly explores and subverts standard tropes of animated sitcoms". The A.V. Club noted that in the show's early seasons, Lincoln lacked definition in the same manner as his sisters, who were all portrayed as specific archetypes denoted by one-note traits, with him fitting the template of the average preadolescent boy (with his primary interests, such as comics and television, being keen supporting evidence); however, their analysis determined that Lincoln's personality is most easily conveyed via his monologuing fourth wall breaks, similarly to Malcolm of Malcolm in the Middle. While comparing Lincoln to SpongeBob SquarePants, praising how "like the underwater fry-cook, Lincoln Loud quickly grabbed the attention and viewership of young audiences", Comic Book Resources negatively described the character and his family as "one-note stock characters". In the early seasons, The Dot and Line praised Lincoln for the effectiveness of his formula of learning the rewarding aspects of his family dynamic, despite the frustration it tends to build on him whenever his plans backfire, but criticized him for being much more developed compared to his sisters, citing them as "ten missed opportunities" due to Lincoln's massive focus in the spotlight. Animated Views considered Lincoln to be less interesting of a character than his sisters in the early seasons, describing him as "a typical straight man as opposed to a leading character", criticizing the hyperfixation of his personal attempts to endure a day with his ten sisters into the plots of most episodes, although they considered the series' premise to not be detrimental, but rather in need of improvement of its presentation at the time. They also noted that Lincoln's sisters were not portrayed as obstacles to him, but rather the series utilized Lincoln as a vessel for focusing on "trying to get through the day as peacefully as one can with so many siblings". While the later seasons shifted the primary focus away from Lincoln and more onto his family, the shift in focus has been acknowledged as not being a factor in alienating audiences. Emily Ashby of Common Sense Media considered Lincoln a positive role model due to his tendency to make peace during conflicts and openly communicate with his sisters to solve problems (barring his jealousy-driven schemes), further elaborating that parents should communicate with their children about the importance of communicating their feelings with family and friends and feeling emphatic for others to follow his example. Lincoln's (and his sisters') prominent maturity in the early seasons was heavily praised for its ability to resonate with adult audiences as well as children because Lincoln's struggles of being the middle child of his large family present an omnipresent message that tension between siblings and with their parents will usually not disappear as people grow older. One episode in particular that dealt with the mature topic of parenthood, "Shell Shock", has been regarded as an example of how the coming-of-age theme is important to keep the narrative moving in the series, as it highlighted how Lincoln himself felt responsible enough to take care of an egg, while he thought his classmate, Ronnie Anne, was reckless and paranoidly forbade her to care for the egg. The Loud House as a series has been praised for enabling its characters to grow in subtle but meaningful ways, with Lincoln in particular being noted as a person who "matures in his problem-solving skills and understanding of his siblings". The character's significance has been highlighted as being "the relatable narrator and central character who navigates life as the only boy among ten sisters[, whose] perspective helps viewers understand family dynamics and the show's themes" and noting the series' portrayal of sibling relationships, especially that of Lincoln with his sisters, as complex but loving through bonds and conflicts alike.

With the launch of The Casagrandes as a spin-off to The Loud House, it has become common for fans of the franchise to wonder whether or not Lincoln and Ronnie Anne, the protagonist of the spin-off, would ever become a couple, which showrunner Michael Rubiner has acknowledged. Although Rubiner has not explicitly mentioned the circling "couple" aspect of the two (simply acknowledging that viewers are "really invested in the characters,") viewers have still accepted the characters explicitly mentioning that they do not express romantic interest in each other and have praised how they are effective as friends and little more.

Following the release of The Loud House Movie, many fans reached out to Lincoln's voice actor, Asher Bishop, on social media and "said that Lincoln's journey was a helpful reminder of their own self-worth." One fan in particular who suffered from Tourette syndrome and severe anxiety mentioned that Lincoln's "I Want" song in the film, "Ordinary Me", resonated with her and helped comfort her. Bob Hoose of PluggedIn praised Lincoln for his wise choices that he makes towards the end of the film, indirectly highlighting his character growth as a light foil to the film's antagonist, Morag, who foolishly deceives and harms people when she selfishly seeks power. Tannavi Sharma of Leisure Byte considered Lincoln's character in the film to be relatable in several moments, but stated that the film "fails to leave an impact on viewers in terms of its message or characters." The Best Darn Girls referred to Lincoln's character growth in A Loud House Christmas Movie: Naughty or Nice as something "that no one will see coming," highlighting how the lesson he learns about giving from the heart is a true sign of niceness, unlike his earlier acts in the film where he pretends to be nice for self-serving purposes, is a positive message for children, and how Lincoln also sets an example for Duncan to learn his lesson about the multiple layers of human personalities and how nobody is ever completely perfect.

Lincoln's character in A Loud House Christmas has been met with divisive response. Scott Sandler of Culture Slate described Lincoln's scheming actions in the film as "cruel and out of character" because he carried out his plans in ways that crossed several lines because they would leave lasting damage, stated that Lincoln's conspicuous avoidance to hide his involvement in his scemes comes off as "incredibly obnoxious", and considered that Lincoln being easily forgiven despite the damage he caused "just didn't sit right" since the difficulties he faced with his family growing up and changing that sparked his entire motivation in the first place were "not an excuse", although he also praised Lincoln for not getting "completely absolved" due to him being sentenced to 300 hours of community service at the end of the film. Diondra K. Brown of Common Sense Media marked the film off as having very few positive role models because of the chaos and mischief that Lincoln causes in the film, but ultimately stated that "[Lincoln's] motivation makes him a positive role model because it displays his love for and commitment to his family." Tessa Smith of Mama's Geeky acknowledged that Lincoln's scheme to unite his family in the film "ends up making a mess of things", but ultimately stated that Lincoln's actions serve as a catalyst for the film's ultimate message about how a family's hearts will always be connected, even in the absence of some. Stephanie Snyder (also from Common Sense Media) praised the casting of Wolfgang Schaeffer as Lincoln Loud and that of his siblings in The Really Loud House as "sure to capture the hearts of young viewers who already loved The Loud House as they see the characters come to life." Ed Sum of Otaku no Culture praised the series for its greater focus on the Loud family as an ensemble, while noting that Lincoln's exploits are still prevalent throughout the series and far from "forgotten". Kennedy Unthank (also from PluggedIn) described the series as "relatable to anyone who grew up with siblings" and noted that several elements from the animated series— notably Lincoln's constant journey of learning to get along with his family and friends— had been carried over. Particularly, he praised the moral that Lincoln learns in the series' first episode, "The Macho Man with the Plan", that a real man will love his family and always do the right thing for them. The Best Darn Girls praised Lincoln for his maturity in A Really Haunted Loud House, noting that "he realizes the error of his ways [by prioritizing Xander ahead of his own family] and works hard to fix them later", and that "the movie shows the consequences [of the pursuit of one's own fame through the use of social media influencers] and lets [the] kids figure it out." Jennifer Green from Common Sense Media praised Lincoln for ultimately prioritizing his family in the film after learning the downsides of attempting to boost his own self-image by attending Xander's Halloween party and following him, as well as for his loving friendship with Clyde, making them stand out from Xander and his cronies, who "act in self-interested and unkind ways."

=== Accolades ===
Year	Presenter	Award/Category	Nominee	Status	Ref.
2017	Young Artist Award	Best Performance in a Voice-Over Role – Teen Actor	Grant Palmer	Won	
2017	6th Behind the Voice Actors Awards	Breakthrough Voice Actor of the Year	Grant Palmer	Nominated	
2017	6th Behind the Voice Actors Awards	Best Male Lead Vocal Performance in a Television Series	Grant Palmer	Nominated	
2017	6th Behind the Voice Actors Awards	Best Vocal Ensemble in a New Television Series (Note: Award shared with Catherine Taber, Liliana Mumy, Nika Futterman, Cristina Pucelli, Jessica DiCicco, Grey DeLisle, Lara Jill Miller, Jill Talley, Brian Stepanek, Caleel Harris, John DiMaggio, Susanne Blakeslee, Carlos PenaVega and Jeff Bennett)	Grant Palmer	Won	
2017	Young Entertainer Awards	Best Young Actor 12 – Voice-Over Role	Grant Palmer	Nominated	
2018	7th Behind the Voice Actors Awards	Best Vocal Ensemble in a Television Series	Collin Dean (Note: Award shared with Catherine Taber, Liliana Mumy, Nika Futterman, Cristina Pucelli, Jessica DiCicco, Grey DeLisle, Lara Jill Miller, Jill Talley and Brian Stepanek)	Nominated	
2022	1st Children's and Family Emmy Awards	Outstanding Younger Voice Performer in an Animated or Preschool Animated Program	Asher Bishop	Nominated	
2023	2023 Kids' Choice Awards	Favorite Male TV Star – Kids	Wolfgang Schaeffer	Nominated	
2024	2024 Kids' Choice Awards	Favorite Male TV Star – Kids	Wolfgang Schaeffer	Nominated	
