= Luna Loud =

Fictional character from The Loud House

- The Loud House character
- First appearance: "Bathroom Break!!" (2014)
- Created by: Chris Savino
- Voiced by: Nika Futterman
- Portrayed by: Sophia Woodward (A Loud House Christmas, The Really Loud House and A Really Haunted Loud House); Ava Torres (young, "Heart and Soul")

In-universe information
- Nickname: Lunes
- Species: Human
- Gender: Female
- Family: Lynn Loud Sr. (father); Rita Loud (mother); Lori Loud (oldest sister); Leni Loud (older sister); Luan Loud (younger sister); Lynn Loud Jr. (younger sister); Lincoln Loud (younger brother); Lucy Loud (younger sister); Lana Loud (younger sister); Lola Loud (younger sister); Lisa Loud (younger sister); Lily Loud (youngest sister)
- Significant other: Sam Sharp
- Relatives: Leonard Loud (paternal grandfather); Albert Reynolds (maternal grandfather); Myrtle Reynolds (maternal step-grandmother); Ruth (maternal great-aunt); Lance Loud (paternal uncle); Sharon Loud (paternal aunt by marriage); Shane Loud (paternal cousin); Shelby Loud (younger paternal cousin); Shiloh Loud (youngest paternal cousin); Duke of Loch Loud (paternal ancestor); Lucille Loud (paternal ancestor)
- Nationality: American

Luna Loud is a fictional character in the American animated television series The Loud House and its resulting multimedia franchise. Voiced by Nika Futterman in animation and portrayed by Sophia Woodward in live action, she is the third child of the Loud family and a musician who owns and plays several instruments, including a purple Dean ML electric guitar, her signature instrument.

In the episode "L Is for Love", Luna is revealed to be attracted to her female classmate and friend Sam Sharp, which establishes Luna as bisexual. Description of this in the show has been met with praise from critics and fans for being a positive representation of LGBTQ people.

== Role and development ==
Luna is a 15-year-old (16-year-old season 5 onward and The Really Loud House) girl, and third child of the Loud family. She is the roommate of her younger sister Luan. She is a musician who owns and plays various instruments, including her signature instrument, a purple Dean ML electric guitar. She was described as a loud, boisterous and freewheeling sister. Luna was named after a pet dachshund Chris Savino's mother-in-law owned. Early in development, Luna alongside her family was going to be depicted as a humanoid rabbits, but this was terminated when an executive, Jenna Boyd, suggested Savino to make them human. According to an interview, she was Savino's favorite character in the series. The episode "White Hare" revisited the abandoned concept of the Loud family being rabbits, with Luna going on to influence two characters; her love of music became the defining personality trait of Barbara (also voiced by Futterman), while her love of British culture became the defining personality trait of Bippa (voiced by Cristina Pucelli).

Sophia Woodward as Luna Loud in The Really Loud House

Luna was voiced by Nika Futterman in animated media, and portrayed by Sophia Woodward in A Loud House Christmas, The Really Loud House, and A Really Haunted Loud House. When auditions for A Loud House Christmas opened, actress Sophia Woodward was not very familiar with The Loud House since she was seventeen years old at the time and therefore outside the series' target demographic, but had heard about it prior, so she heavily researched the series to develop her own characterization of Luna. She also took inspiration from singer Joan Jett to pour human inspiration into the character, and even sang her hit single "Bad Reputation" at her audition. Woodward has considered Luna's love for music as a perk that appealed to her, with it along with her non-conformist personality being the traits that inspired her to play the character. She has gone on to say that Luna has a unique layer study possessed by no other character in the series due to her musicality, which makes her stand out as a more complex character compared to the rest of the main cast. For the role, Woodward was asked to cut her hair so she could sport Luna's signature pixie cut, which she bravely did for the first time in her life. The haircut ultimately inspired her to change the way she viewed femininity in accordance with the diverse types of women that Lincoln's sisters (particularly Luna) represent. She also learned how to play guitar for the role, which further inspired her to begin writing her own music. Woodward was open to reprising her role as Luna when The Really Loud House was green lit due to the relationships she had developed with the cast and crew of the film, describing it as "more than [she] could ever ask for." As an innovation relative to the film, The Really Loud House had Luna explore other music genres besides her general rock, including rap (which was also a new genre to the actress), commercial jingles, and country, but ultimately kept her "true to her classic rock roots", according to Woodward.

=== Sexual orientation ===
Following the introduction of the series' first LGBTQ couple, Howard and Harold McBride, the writing staff discussed the possibility of establishing one of Lincoln's sisters as LGBTQ. Kevin Sullivan, who had previously written the McBride fathers' debut episode, "Overnight Success", was tasked with writing the episode "L Is for Love", which introduced Luna's love interest, Sam Sharp. Sullivan wasn't barred from using the word lesbian in dialogue when writing the storyline for Luna and her crush, Sam, but he said that "we just can't say those words because of how young our audience can skew, but the joy of the episode, that I was proud of, was that it wasn't a 'coming out' episode. The entire family accepted her, there was no having to come out." In order to positively establish that Luna is a member of the LGBTQ community, the writers laid out three principles for her (and Sam's) characterization in the episode: to give her crush a gender-neutral name to make it less obvious that her crush was female, to include a male musician (Note: Later revealed to be named Sully via the introduction to the licensed graphic novel The Struggle Is Real) in all shots featuring Sam to hide the surprise that Sam was female until the end of the episode, and that whenever Luna mentions Sam to her family, they know that she is referring to a girl and do not have any issues with it.

Entertainment Weekly writer Nick Romano interview with Michael Rubiner, the showrunner of the series who plans to continue the relationship between Luna and Sam, but he doesn’t have any end point in mind for the two but "with 10 girls in the family", he felt natural "to explore one of them being LGBTQ." As of the episode "Racing Hearts", Luna and Sam are officially dating, and Luna would later go on to refer to Sam as her girlfriend in the episode "Undercover Mom".

== Reception ==
A 2017 study by the University of Turku concluded that based on questionnaires handed out to six adult men at the average age of 21.2 years, Luna was the most popular character among the periphery demographic, but less so one of the series' more relatable characters.

Following the introduction of Luna as LGBTQ, some fans of the series theorized that she was bisexual, due to a previous episode depicting her as attracted to a young man named Hugh. However, others have refused to give her an explicit label, and Sullivan told Business Insider that he would not push the use of LGBTQ-specific terminology into the dialogue because Luna has become a representative of many young people who were struggling with their identity. Furthermore, Lisa M. Diamond, professor of psychology and gender studies at the University of Utah has gone on record to say that young viewers usually don't assign sexuality labels to themselves until the age of 12, but they aren't associating those labels with others. Diamond indicates that "their understanding of LGBTQ identity is 'couple-centric,' with little recognition of visual or verbal innuendos and a better understanding of the romantic symbolism they see in marketing." "L Is for Love", the episode that revealed her LGBTQ status, has been regarded as "an excellent example of not having to 'come out' to one's family" because Luna's angst towards expressing her feelings for Sam is not presented any differently than how the other siblings would have done so to their opposite-sex crushes, with the main deal being more so that Sam won't reciprocate her feelings than that she is straight.

Luna's queer orientation has widely been well-received by viewers, especially those who themselves are queer and/or did not grow up with similar representation. The fan base has christened her and Sam with the couple name "Saluna", which the series' crew has acknowledged, and they have declared the fandom's overall positive response to them as a couple to be emotional to them. Other viewers have also praised the decision not to push her relationship with Sam into the background because of how well it defines her as an active LGBTQ character. The episode "Racing Hearts", which delved deeper into Luna's relationship with Sam, was praised for how it portrayed them as a casual couple without drawing attention to the fact that they are both homosexual, as the plot could have played out just the same way with a heterosexual couple in the spotlight. Screen Rant marked The Loud House as one of their top ten children's shows with LGBTQ representation, with Luna's alignment being one of the major contributing factors. Anthony Dean of Diverse Tech Geek has considered the implementation of LGBTQ characters, especially Luna and Sam, to be one of the highlights of the series.

In 2017, Nika Futterman was nominated for a Behind the Voice Actors Award in the category of Voice Actress of the Year, with her role as Luna being one of the key factors, and won another BTVA Award that year in the category of Best Vocal Ensemble in a New Television Series, which was shared with the rest of the series' main cast. She would also go on to be nominated for another BTVA Award in 2018 in the category of Best Vocal Ensemble in a Television Series, again shared with the rest of the main cast, due to her role as Luna. The way Luna and Sam's relationship is handled (along with that of Howard and Harold) has played a role in the series getting nominated at the 29th, 31st, 32nd, 33rd, 35th, and 36th GLAAD Media Awards, the latter of which also had The Really Loud House nominated for the episode "Louds in Love", which featured Luna's relationship with Sam as a supporting plot element. (Note: Before Luna was established as LGBT, the series had previously been nominated at the 28th GLAAD Media Awards for the episode "Attention Deficit", which featured Howard and Harold in prominent roles.)

== See also ==
- Howard and Harold McBride, Nickelodeon's first married gay couple.
