= A Loud House Christmas =

2021 American television film

- Official release poster
- Genre: Adventure; Comedy; Family; Christmas films Sitcom
- Based on: The Loud House by Chris Savino
- Screenplay by: Liz Maccie
- Directed by: Jonathan Judge
- Starring: Wolfgang Schaeffer; Jahzir Bruno; Lexi DiBenedetto; Dora Dolphin; Sophia Woodward; Catherine Ashmore Bradley; Morgan McGill; Aubin Bradley; Lexi Janicek; Mia Allan; Ella Allan; Charlotte Anne Tucker; Lainey Jane Knowles; Catherine Taber; Muretta Moss; Brian Stepanek
- Composer: Nick Urata
- Country of origin: United States
- Original language: English

Production
- Executive producers: Michael Rubiner; Matt Bierman; Jonathan Judge
- Producers: Darlene Caamaño Loquet; Todd Williams
- Production location: Atlanta, Georgia
- Cinematography: Jules Labarthe
- Editor: Anita Brandt Burgoyne
- Running time: 63 minutes
- Production company: Nickelodeon Productions

Original release
- Network: Nickelodeon; Paramount+
- Release: November 26, 2021

Related
- The Really Loud House

A Loud House Christmas is a 2021 American live-action Christmas comedy adventure family television film based on the Nickelodeon animated series, The Loud House. The film is directed by Jonathan Judge, written by Liz Maccie, and stars Wolfgang Schaeffer, Jahzir Bruno, Lexi DiBenedetto, Dora Dolphin, Sophia Woodward, Catherine Ashmore Bradley, Morgan McGill, Aubin Bradley, Lexi Janicek, Mia Allan, Ella Allan, Charlotte Anne Tucker, Lainey Jane Knowles, and Muretta Moss while Catherine Taber and Brian Stepanek reprise their respective roles from the animated series as characters Katherine Mulligan and Lynn Loud Sr. The first live-action work and second film in the overall franchise after The Loud House Movie, it aired on Nickelodeon on November 26, 2021, and started streaming on Paramount+ the same day. The film also serves as the backdoor pilot of the sequel series, The Really Loud House.

A live-action television series sequel called The Really Loud House, featuring several cast members from the film, premiered November 3, 2022.

== Plot ==
The Loud family is preparing for Christmas as Lincoln mentions that Christmas can get pretty hectic in the Loud House. Everyone gathers in the kitchen for breakfast except for Lori who is away at Fairway University. Lori mentions on the video chat that it would be too much to come join them. Lincoln disagrees as Christmas is about being together. Everyone else mentions that they have something else to do: Luna is going skiing with Sam, Luan has a gig at Sunset Canyon Retirement Home, and Lynn Sr. and Rita plan to take everyone else to Miami Beach, Florida. He gets a package that turns out to be a 13-person toboggan to use on Tall Timbers Hill and opens it in front of his family only to find that it broke during the delivery.

Lincoln and his best friend Clyde make a plan on how to get the family together for Christmas. They make Lori homesick, fool Luna into thinking that Mick wants to jam with her, build a Sharkodile out of Clyde's family's film props, and disguise themselves as elderly people at the Sunset Canyon Retirement Home to pull off pranks enough for Pop-Pop to cancel Luan's gig. Lori enlists Bobby to get her to Royal Woods on his moped. Later on, while getting ready for the tree-lighting ceremony, Lincoln finds that he only made things worse for the family, having accidentally sprayed Lisa's custom-built Sharkodile repellent on Lynn Sr. causing him to not see straight, lose balance, and have unintelligible speech.

As Rita goes to pick up a stranded Lori and Bobby, Lincoln tries to call Katherine Mulligan and tell her that the creature isn't real, but she believes that he's pranking her. So, he and Clyde pilot the Sharkodile down Franklin Avenue where they drag some of the Loud House's decorations. They crash it into Royal Woods Mall just as the Louds, the McBrides, Rip, and Katherine catch up while Pop-Pop is among those seeing it on the news. Lincoln confesses the truth to everyone that he didn't want his family to be apart on Christmas. His family forgives him with his parents admitting that no Christmas tradition can be broken.

On Christmas Day, everyone is opening their presents. While mentioning that he has 300 hours of community service for the Sharkodile incident, Lincoln also mentions that Luna and Sam have their skiing trip back on, Luan's gig is reinstated by Pop-Pop, Lori will be taken back to Fairway University, and the rest of the family will be heading to Miami. Rita leads the family in presenting Lincoln with the rebuilt toboggan named Sledzilla. With help from Lisa's successful experiment, Lincoln, his sisters, his parents, and Clyde have a snowball fight. Then they ride Sledzilla down Tall Timbers Hill.

== Cast ==
- Wolfgang Schaeffer as Lincoln Loud
- Jahzir Bruno as Clyde McBride
- Lexi DiBenedetto as Lori Loud
- Dora Dolphin as Leni Loud
- Sophia Woodward as Luna Loud
- Catherine Ashmore Bradley as Luan Loud
- Morgan McGill as Lynn Loud
- Aubin Bradley as Lucy Loud
- Mia Allan as Lana Loud
- Ella Allan as Lola Loud
- Lexi Janicek as Lisa Loud
- Charlotte Ann Tucker and Lainey Jane Knowles as Lily Loud
- Catherine Taber as Katherine Mulligan
- Muretta Moss as Rita Loud
- Brian Stepanek as Lynn Loud Sr.
- Matt Van Smith as Bobby Santiago
- Zoë DuVall as Sam Sharp
- Justin Michael Stevenson as Howard McBride
- Marcus Folmar as Harold McBride
- Bill Southworth as Pop-Pop
- Jill Jane Clements as Scoots
- Gail Everett-Smith as Nana Gayle
- Jeff Bennett as the voice of Mick Swagger
- Brian Patrick Wade as Rip Hardcore
- John Mullins as Mall Santa
- Garrett Hammond as Bill the Delivery Driver
- Kathleen Shugrue as Audrey Hoffman
- Sharon Frank as a Sunset Canyon resident
- Joy A. Kennelly as a shopper
- Courtney Mason as a Fairway University Coach

== Production ==
The film was first announced on February 19, 2020, it was originally set to be released in 2020. It was delayed due to the COVID-19 pandemic. On March 18, 2021, it was announced that production would begin next month. The same day, it was announced that Wolfgang Schaeffer were cast as Lincoln and Jahzir Bruno were cast as Clyde. Production began in April 2021 in Atlanta with the working title The Loud House: A Very Loud Christmas! On August 23, 2021, Nickelodeon revealed the full cast. The movie was released on Nickelodeon and Paramount+ on November 26, 2021, as previously announced on October 15, 2021.

== Release ==
The film premiered on November 26, 2021, on Nickelodeon and Paramount+.

== Reception ==
The special drew a 1.9/383,000 among Kids 2–11, a 2.1/252,000 with Kids 6-11 and drew 881,000 total viewers in Live+Same Day making it TV's top kids entertainment telecast of 2021. They had 3.1 million views of the original premiere.

== Home media ==
Region	Set title	Season(s)	Aspect ratio	Episode count	Time length	Release date
1	A Loud House Christmas Collection	1, 2	16:9	7	199 minutes	October 29, 2024

== Sequel television series ==
On March 24, 2022, a live-action television series sequel to A Loud House Christmas was announced to have been ordered to series for the Paramount+ streaming service, with most of the main cast members of the film reprising their roles, in particular Wolfgang Schaeffer as Lincoln and Jahzir Bruno as Clyde, with the film retroactively being considered the series' television pilot. Filming for the series began in Albuquerque, New Mexico in June 2022. In September 2022, it was announced that the series, titled The Really Loud House, would instead premiere on Nickelodeon. On October 5, 2022, it was announced that the series would premiere on November 3, 2022.

== See also ==
- List of Nickelodeon original films
- List of Christmas films
