= The Loud House =

American animated sitcom

- Genre: Animated sitcom; Comedy
- Created by: Chris Savino
- Showrunners: Chris Savino (seasons 1–3); Michael Rubiner (season 3–present)
- Creative directors: Amanda Rynda; Ashley Kliment-Baker
- Voices of: Grant Palmer; Collin Dean; Tex Hammond; Asher Bishop; Bentley Griffin; Sawyer Cole; Nick A. Fisher; Catherine Taber; Liliana Mumy; Nika Futterman; Cristina Pucelli; Jessica DiCicco; Grey DeLisle; Lara Jill Miller; Caleel Harris; Andre Robinson; Jahzir Bruno; Jaeden White; Juliano Krue Valdi; Jill Talley; Brian Stepanek
- Theme music composer: Michelle Lewis; Doug Rockwell; Chris Savino
- Opening theme: "The Loud House Theme Song" by Michelle Lewis, Doug Rockwell, and Chris Savino
- Ending theme: "The Loud House End Credits" by Freddy Horvath and Chris Savino
- Composers: Doug Rockwell; Jonathan Hylander
- Country of origin: United States
- Original language: English
- No. of seasons: 10
- No. of episodes: 315 (list of episodes)

Production
- Executive producers: Chris Savino (seasons 1–3); Michael Rubiner (season 4–present) (Note: Co-executive producer, seasons 3–mid season 4)
- Producers: Karen Malach (seasons 1–5); Ian Murray (season 5–present)
- Running time: 11–43 minutes
- Production company: Nickelodeon Animation Studio

Original release
- Network: Nickelodeon
- Release: May 2, 2016 – present

Related
- The Loud House franchise

The Loud House is an American animated sitcom created by Chris Savino that premiered on Nickelodeon on May 2, 2016. The series revolves around the chaotic everyday life of a boy named Lincoln Loud, who is the middle child and only son in a large family of 11 children. It is set in a fictional town in southeastern Michigan called Royal Woods, based on Savino's hometown of Royal Oak. The series was pitched to the network in 2013 as a two-minute short film entered in the annual Animated Shorts Program. It entered production the following year. The series is based on Savino's own childhood growing up in a large family, and its animation is largely influenced by newspaper comic strips.

Since its debut, the series has gained high ratings, becoming the top-rated children's animated series on American television within its first month on the air. The series has received considerable media attention and nominations at both the 28th and the 29th GLAAD Media Awards for its inclusion of Howard and Harold McBride, two supporting characters who are an interracial gay married couple. Their introduction into the series was reported in the news as being historic and caused a rating surge. In May 2017, the characters of Lincoln Loud and Clyde McBride were featured on the front cover of Variety as an example of diverse characters in children's television.

As of May 2026, ten seasons of the series have been broadcast under 315 blocks of episodes. The series has spawned a multimedia franchise, including the spin-off series The Casagrandes, which aired from October 2019 to September 2022, an animated feature film that was released on Netflix in August 2021, a live-action television film that premiered in November 2021, and live-action series The Really Loud House that premiered in November 2022. Additionally, a second live-action television film A Really Haunted Loud House premiered in September 2023, as well as a second animated feature film, The Casagrandes Movie, which premiered in March 2024 on Netflix. A third animated film, titled No Time to Spy, premiered in June 2024 on Paramount+ and Nickelodeon. A fourth animated film, titled Naughty or Nice, premiered in November 2025.

== Premise ==
Lincoln Loud is the middle child and only boy in a family of eleven children residing in the fictional town of Royal Woods, Michigan. He has ten sisters, each with a distinctive personality: bossy eldest child Lori, ditzy fashionista Leni, musician Luna, comedian Luan, athletic Lynn Jr., gloomy poetic goth Lucy, polar opposite twins Lana and Lola, child genius Lisa, and baby Lily. Lincoln often breaks the fourth wall to explain to the viewers the chaotic conditions and sibling relationships of the household, and continually devises plans to make his life in the Loud House better.

During the first four seasons, Lori, Leni, Luna, and Luan were in high school, Lynn was in middle school, and Lincoln, Lucy, Lana, Lola, and Lisa were in elementary school. In the fifth season, the Loud siblings aged up a year, with Lori entering college, Lincoln going to middle school, and Lily starting preschool.

== Episodes ==
Season	Segments	Episodes	Originally released	
Season	Segments	Episodes	First released	Last released
1	52	26	May 2, 2016	November 8, 2016
2	49	26	November 9, 2016	December 1, 2017
3	48	26	January 19, 2018	March 7, 2019
4	50	26	May 27, 2019	July 23, 2020
5	47	26	September 11, 2020	March 4, 2022
6	49	26	March 11, 2022	May 16, 2023
7	38	20	May 17, 2023	June 6, 2024
8	22	13	June 10, 2024	July 25, 2025
9	35	20	August 1, 2025	April 24, 2026
10	17	9	May 1, 2026	TBA
11	TBA	TBA	TBA	TBA

== Production ==
=== Development ===
Series creator Chris Savino grew up as the ninth of ten children, having five sisters and four brothers. Throughout his childhood, he had been fascinated by comic strips and cartoons, and since he was the quiet one among his siblings, he would frequently sneak away to read or draw comics in a style that mimicked the ones he read in newspapers. By his senior year at Dondero High School, Savino learned about careers in the animation industry and immersed himself in every animation book that he could find at his local libraries. In 1990, Savino received word that Big House Blues, a cartoon that he had viewed at an animation festival earlier that year, had been picked up for a full series in the form of The Ren & Stimpy Show. In response to the news, he mailed a letter and some drawings to its creator, John Kricfalusi, which secured him an opportunity to join that series' staff.

In 2013, Savino was introduced to the Nickelodeon Animated Shorts Program by executive Jenna Boyd. He was presented the opportunity to pitch three ideas as a 2 1/2-minute short for the program, out of which one would be picked. The executives selected his idea that involved a big family, which was about a male rabbit with twenty-five sisters dealing with the chaos of living among an extensively large immediate family. Savino had decided to make the characters rabbits because he had come fresh off the production of Kick Buttowski: Suburban Daredevil, which had an all-human cast, and knew that standards and practices are typically more restrictive with human characters, which gave him the desire to explore more extreme physical humor that is generally accepted with animal-based cartoons; he also considered making the characters mice when one staff member took issue with the rabbits. After presenting his pitch, Boyd advised Savino to consider making the characters human, deeming that to make it more likely to get his pitch sold. Boyd's advice inspired Savino to base the series on his own experiences growing up in a large family, so he retooled his concept art of the short's protagonist (at the time named Warren, a reference to rabbit warrens) so it depicted a human and pared down his 25 sisters to ten, which he deemed to be much more manageable and biologically believable from a human standpoint and used it as a reflection of his experiences growing up in a family of ten. The idea of the Loud family being rabbits became reused as Lincoln's dream in the Season 3 episode "White Hare".

While the series was primarily inspired by Savino's experiences growing up in a large family, it was never intended to be autobiographical on his part; to reflect this, Savino characterized Lincoln as the polar opposite of him, stating that "Lincoln’s the type of kid who always has a plan" and that "if there’s something that he wants, and he knows that he has 10 siblings who are basically obstacles, then he’s going to do what it takes to get what he wants." Many of the writers, particularly those who had siblings themselves, would give inputs on things that happened to them as kids, which then blossomed into the premises for episodes of the show. During development, the writing staff took heavy inspiration from The Brady Bunch due to its similar focus on the chaos held by a large family and the heart shared by all of its members, as well as animated series such as Hey Arnold!, The Simpsons and Daria due to their use of young characters "who were allowed to be more flawed and real than their live-action counterparts" within the main cast.

Savino named the main characters and other core elements in the series after various things in his life. His five sisters became the inspirations for Lori, Luan, Lynn, Lana, and Lisa; Lola and Luna were named after two dachshunds that were owned by Savino and his mother-in-law, respectively; Lucy and Lily were two names that Savino and his wife had intended to use in the event that they had daughters; Leni was named after Lennie Small from Of Mice and Men; and Lincoln was named after E Lincoln Avenue, the street that Savino grew up on as a child. The short had always been titled "The Loud House", though its name was originally only in reference to the chaotic nature of a family of that size; a Nickelodeon employee named Scott Kreamer suggested that the family's name be Loud, which Savino caught onto, thinking it was a clever idea since it would give the siblings alliterative names. The siblings having an alliterative naming theme was further inspired by writer Karla Sakas Shropshire, who grew up with three siblings, all having names beginning with K. The Loud family's pets, Charles, Cliff, Geo and Walt, were named after Charles M. Schulz, Cliff Sterrett, George Herriman, and Walt Kelly— the creators of the comic strips Peanuts, Polly and Her Pals, Krazy Kat, and Pogo, respectively— which Savino has cited as some of his biggest influences on the series. The Loud family's street, Franklin Avenue, was named after Benjamin Franklin Elementary School, which Savino attended as a child. The city the series takes place in, Royal Woods, had its name derived partially from Savino's hometown of Royal Oak, and partially from Huntington Woods, the hometown of story editor and later showrunner Michael Rubiner.

Newspaper comic strips have served as major influences on the show's characters and animation. Savino opted to make the series resemble a comic strip as an homage to the ones that he enjoyed growing up. Do do this, he employed tactics such as keeping the camera at eye level so focus could remain on the characters in order to extract as much humor from them as possible, using a limited color palette for the backgrounds (which were given a paper texture) and plenty of spot black and shadows, giving the characters' wardrobes their own signature colors, and frequent use of fight clouds, onomatopoeic bursts, and other comic tropes. Knowing that the series' large cast would prove difficult to animate by means of traditional hand-drawn animation, Savino pushed to use Toon Boom Harmony to animate the show for ease on the animators.

Savino's original pitch was approved for pilot production on January 30, 2014. In June 2014, Nickelodeon announced that The Loud House had been picked up for a season of 13 episodes. The episode order was later increased to 26. On May 25, 2016, Nickelodeon announced that the series had been picked up for a second season of 14 episodes later increased to 26. On October 19, 2016, the series was picked up for a third season of 26 episodes.

Episodes are produced at Nickelodeon Animation Studio in Burbank, California, USA and animated by Canadian studio Jam Filled Entertainment.

On February 12, 2026, series writer Kevin Sullivan announced that the series was no longer in production. He later clarified the series was not canceled, but that the production team was awaiting word from the executives. Production of the ninth season ended; those episodes were broken up into multiple seasons by Nickelodeon.

On October 20, 2026, series director Jessica Borutski announced that Nickelodeon had picked up the series for a tenth season, with production duties shifting to Canada from this season onwards.

=== Savino's firing ===
On October 17, 2017, Cartoon Brew reported that Chris Savino was suspended from the studio due to allegations of sexual harassment, the report noting that rumors of Savino's behavior have existed for "at least a decade". On October 19, a Nickelodeon spokesperson confirmed that Savino had been fired from the studio, and that the series will continue production without him. Six days later on October 23, Savino spoke for the first time since his firing saying he said he was "deeply sorry" for his actions. Alongside the announcement of the series being greenlit for a fourth season, it was revealed that story editor Michael Rubiner had now been named executive producer and showrunner. On May 30, 2018, Savino was suspended from The Animation Guild, IATSE Local 839, for one year.

== Broadcast ==
The series debuted on Nickelodeon on May 2, 2016, with new episodes premiering every weekday that month. The first trailer for the series premiered on March 13, 2016. The series also aired on AFN Family.

Internationally, the series premiered in Israel and Italy on May 15. It premiered in Latin America, Brazil, Poland, Germany, France and Africa the following day. It began airing in Southeast Asia on May 20. Australia, New Zealand, the United Kingdom and Ireland's Nickelodeon channels premiered the series on May 30. In Canada, YTV aired a sneak peek of the series on September 5, 2016, which was followed by an official premiere on September 6, 2016.

The series premiered on May 15, 2016, in the Middle East and North Africa on Nickelodeon, dubbed in Gulf Arabic.

In India, the series premiered on Nick HD+ on May 18, 2020.

== Home media ==
DVD releases
Region	Set title	Season(s)	Aspect ratio	Episode count	Time length	Release date
1	Welcome to The Loud House	1	16:9	13	305 minutes	May 23, 2017
1	It Gets Louder	1	16:9	13	293 minutes	May 22, 2018
1	Relative Chaos	2	16:9	13	293 minutes	May 21, 2019
1	Absolute Madness	2	16:9	13	293 minutes	May 19, 2020
1	Road Tripped	3	16:9	13	293 minutes	May 18, 2021
1	The Complete First Season	1	16:9	26	TBA	October 19, 2021
1	The Complete Second Season	2	16:9	26	TBA	October 19, 2021
1	Cooked	3	16:9	13	TBA	November 2, 2021
1	The Complete Third Season	3	16:9	26	TBA	May 24, 2022
1	The Complete Seasons 1, 2 & 3	1, 2, 3	16:9	78	1770 minutes	June 16, 2024
1	A Loud House Christmas Collection (Note: Bundled with A Loud House Christmas)	1, 2, 5, 6, 7, shorts	16:9	11	199 minutes	October 29, 2024
2	A Very Loud Christmas (UK)	1, 2	16:9	7	90 minutes	October 29, 2018
2	Intégrale de la saison 1	1	1.78:1	26	572 minutes	December 5, 2018
2	L'amour vache	1	1.78:1	7	154 minutes	December 5, 2018
2	La chasse au trésor	1	1.78:1	6	132 minutes	December 5, 2018
2	Les sœurs à la rescousse	1	1.78:1	6	132 minutes	December 5, 2018
2	Tempête à la maison	1	1.78:1	7	154 minutes	December 5, 2018
2	Intégrale de la saison 2	2	1.78:1	26	572 minutes	December 4, 2019
2	Tirages de portraits	2	1.78:1	7	154 minutes	December 4, 2019
2	Chaos familial	2	1.78:1	6	132 minutes	December 4, 2019
2	Photo de groupe	2	1.78:1	7	154 minutes	December 4, 2019
2	Les vacances à la neige	2	1.78:1	6	132 minutes	December 4, 2019
2	Intégrale de la saison 3	3	1.78:1	24	572 minutes	November 11, 2020
2	Saison 4 : partie 1	4	1.78:1	13	TBA	November 17, 2021
2	Les Casagrandes	4	16:9	7	154 minutes	November 17, 2021
2	Les rois de la convention	4	16:9	6	132 minutes	November 17, 2021
2	Saison 4: partie 2	4	1.78:1	13	286 minutes	February 23, 2022
2	Intégrale de la saison 4	4	1.78:1	26	TBA	October 5, 2022
4	A Very Loud Christmas (Australia)	1, 2	16:9	7	90 minutes	November 14, 2018

== Reception ==
=== Critical ===
The Loud House has received positive reviews, specifically for its animation, voice acting, characterization, and the heartwarming themes of each episode. Emily Ashby of Common Sense Media praised the show's voice cast and thematic messages, writing that "kids will come to The Loud House for the laughs, but they'll return for the ensemble cast and the surprisingly heartwarming themes that dominate every story." Kevin Johnson of The A.V. Club gave the series a B+, noting that "the female characters are defined by their traits, but never judged for them."

In the show's later years, it received heavy criticism for its long-running status and growing amount of spin-offs and extended media, with critics and audiences alleging the series was experiencing a decline in quality. Ryan Lewis of CBR.com wrote that "Nickelodeon tried too hard to match SpongeBob's influence and immediately took to creating spin-offs, a Netflix movie, and countless merchandise. These efforts may have been justified had The Loud House not been written with one-note stock characters making up its main cast."

The Loud House has developed a fanbase among adults since its debut. In a 2017 study by the University of Turku centered on the formation of adult fandoms around animated series aimed at children and adolescents, the author, Joonas Välimäki, examined the series' adult fanbase through its dedicated subreddit on Reddit, r/theloudhouse. Välimäki found that discussions within the subreddit tend to involve the series' episodes and fan content and conducted a survey with six participants, who were all men around the age of 21. The survey revealed that the participants found out about the series through commercials on Nickelodeon and animated-related discourse on the internet. The Loud House: Revamped, a fan fiction published by Jamesdean5842 and mainly centered around the series was written from 2017 to 2024. It was 16 million words long by 2022 and over 30 million upon completion, claimed by The Spectator Australia to be "the longest fiction work in the history of the world". The Crescent stated that it did not qualify for a Guinness World Record nomination because of its legal status.

==== LGBT representation ====
As with other animated series made in the late 2010s and 2020s, The Loud House has been noted for its strong implementation of LGBT themes, including same-sex relationships and people of color. The characters of Howard and Harold McBride have received praise for being a positive representation of an interracial gay married couple. They are the first married gay couple to be featured in a Nicktoon. Laura Bradley of Vanity Fair stated that The Loud House "handles the topic [of same-sex marriage] in exactly the right way...this kind of casual representation in children's programming is a milestone." De Elizabeth of Teen Vogue wrote, "The best part is that the show doesn't treat these characters any differently, or even introduce them with a heavy asterisk about their marital status." Time reported that "people are thrilled about Nickelodeon's decision" to include a gay couple. Some conservative groups, by contrast, have criticized the introduction of the characters. The One Million Moms division of the American Family Association objected to scenes featuring the McBride parents and unsuccessfully pushed for the episode in which they first appeared to be edited to exclude the couple, saying that "Nickelodeon should stick to entertaining instead of pushing an agenda." The Kenya Film Classification Board also called for the suspension of the series on pay television service DStv, saying that the animated series "promotes the Lesbian, Gay and Transgender agenda."

Kenya's film and classification board (KFCB) has called for the suspension of several US-produced children's programs running on channels provided by TV company MultiChoice. The board said the cartoons featured "disturbing content glorifying homosexual behavior" which was not suitable for children.

The animation programs are The Loud House, The Legend of Korra, and Hey Arnold!, which run on the Nickelodeon channel, and Clarence, Steven Universe, and Adventure Time which air on Cartoon Network. ...

It's wasn't immediately clear if the supposedly offending Nickelodeon episodes ever aired in Kenya. Viacom Africa, which licenses the Nickelodeon shows said last July it would not be airing such shows in South Africa and the rest of sub Saharan Africa.

— Abdi Latif Dahir, Quartz Africa,

=== Ratings ===
The Loud House became the number-one children's animated series on television within its first month on the air. Throughout May 2016, it received an average of 68% more viewers in its target audience of children aged 6–11 than broadcasts on Nickelodeon in May of the previous year. As of June 2016, it was Nickelodeon's highest-rated program, beating SpongeBob SquarePants with an average Nielsen rating of 4.9 among the 2–11 demographic at the time.

Los Angeles Times cited The Loud House as a major factor in maintaining Nickelodeon's position as the highest-rated children's network in summer 2016. During the show's fourth week of premieres, Cyma Zarghami announced that it was continuing to draw more viewers than any other program on the channel.

The show's highest-rated episode, with 2.28 million viewers upon its premiere, is "Two Boys and a Baby". This was the first episode to air after it was announced that Howard and Harold McBride would be debuting on the program. The first episode of The Loud House shown at prime time, "11 Louds a Leapin'", was the seventh most-viewed telecast across all U.S. households on November 25, 2016.

=== Awards and nominations ===
The Loud House's portrayal of interracial gay married couple Howard and Harold McBride led the series to be nominated for Outstanding Individual Episode at the 28th GLAAD Media Awards and for Outstanding Kids & Family Programming at the 29th, 31st, 32nd and 35th GLAAD Media Awards. The series has also been nominated for Favorite Cartoon at the Kids' Choice Awards every year since 2017, excluding 2026.

Year	Presenter	Award/Category	Nominee	Status	Ref.
2017	NAMIC Vision Awards	Animation	The Loud House	Nominated	
2017	28th GLAAD Media Awards	Outstanding Individual Episode	"Attention Deficit"	Nominated	
2017	Kids' Choice Awards	Favorite Cartoon	The Loud House	Nominated	
2017	Young Artist Award	Best Performance in a Voice-Over Role – Teen Actor	Grant Palmer	Won	
2017	ASCAP Screen Television Award	Top Television Series	Doug Rockwell; Michelle Lewis; Phillip Cimino	Won	
2017	6th Behind the Voice Actors Awards	Voice Actress of the Year	Grey DeLisle	Nominated	
2017	6th Behind the Voice Actors Awards	Voice Actress of the Year	Nika Futterman	Nominated	
2017	6th Behind the Voice Actors Awards	Breakthrough Voice Actor of the Year	Grant Palmer	Nominated	
2017	6th Behind the Voice Actors Awards	Best Male Lead Vocal Performance in a Television Series	Grant Palmer	Nominated	
2017	6th Behind the Voice Actors Awards	Best Female Lead Vocal Performance in a Television Series	Cristina Pucelli	Nominated	
2017	6th Behind the Voice Actors Awards	Best Male Vocal Performance in a Television Series in a Guest Role	Alan Ruck	Nominated	
2017	6th Behind the Voice Actors Awards	Best Vocal Ensemble in a New Television Series	Grant Palmer Catherine Taber Liliana Mumy Nika Futterman Cristina Pucelli Jessica DiCicco Grey DeLisle Lara Jill Miller Jill Talley Brian Stepanek Caleel Harris John DiMaggio Susanne Blakeslee Carlos PenaVega Jeff Bennett	Won	
2017	Young Entertainer Awards	Best Young Actor 12 - Voice-Over Role	Grant Palmer	Nominated	
2018	29th GLAAD Media Awards	Outstanding Kids & Family Programming	The Loud House	Nominated	
2018	45th Annie Awards	Outstanding Achievement for Production Design in an Animated Television/Broadcast Production	Amanda Rynda; Larry Murphy; Edgar Duncan; Hallie Wilson; Jared Morgan (For episode: "Tricked!")	Nominated	
2018	Kids' Choice Awards	Favorite Cartoon	The Loud House	Nominated	
2018	2018 Genesis Awards	Outstanding Children's Programming	"Frog Wild"	Won	
2018	45th Daytime Emmy Awards	Outstanding Directing in an Animated Program	Kyle Marshall; Lisa Schaffer	Nominated	
2018	45th Daytime Emmy Awards	Outstanding Writing in an Animated Program	Eric Acosta; Sammie Crowley; Karla Shropshire; Kevin Sullivan; Whitney Wetta; Michael Rubiner	Nominated	
2018	7th Behind the Voice Actors Awards	Best Female Lead Vocal Performance in a Television Series	Liliana Mumy	Nominated	
2018	7th Behind the Voice Actors Awards	Best Vocal Ensemble in a Television Series	Collin Dean Catherine Taber Liliana Mumy Nika Futterman Cristina Pucelli Jessica DiCicco Grey DeLisle Lara Jill Miller Jill Talley Brian Stepanek	Nominated	
2018	Nickelodeon Mexico Kids' Choice Awards	Favorite Cartoon	The Loud House	Won	
2019	Kids' Choice Awards	Favorite Cartoon	The Loud House	Nominated	
2019	46th Daytime Emmy Awards	Outstanding Children's Animated Series	The Loud House	Won	
2019	46th Daytime Emmy Awards	Outstanding Writing in an Animated Program	Eric Acosta; Sammie Crowley; Karla Sakas Shirosphire; Kevin Sullivan; Whitney Wetta; Michael Rubiner	Won	
2019	46th Daytime Emmy Awards	Outstanding Editing in an Animated Program	Oliver Pearce; Amaris Cavin; Gayle M. Grech; Andrew Huang; Monica DeStefano; Rachel Russakoff; Jon Kinyon; Richard A. Domincus; Matthew Malach; Matt Brailey	Nominated	
2019	46th Daytime Emmy Awards	Outstanding Music Direction and Composition	Doug Rockwell; Michelle Lewis	Nominated	
2019	Young Artist Award	Best Performance in a Voice-Over Role – Teen Actor	Andre Robinson	Won	
2019	Young Artist Award	Best Performance in a Voice-Over Role – Teen Actress	Bria Singleton	Nominated	
2019	Imagen Awards	Best Children's Television Programming	The Loud House (For episode: "The Loudest Thanksgiving")	Won	
2020	31st GLAAD Media Awards	Outstanding Kids & Family Programming	The Loud House	Nominated	
2020	Kids' Choice Awards	Favorite Animated Series	The Loud House	Nominated	
2020	47th Daytime Emmy Awards	Outstanding Children's Animated Series	The Loud House	Nominated	
2020	Humanitas Prize	Children's Teleplay	Kevin Sullivan (For episode: "Racing Hearts")	Nominated	
2021	Golden Reel Awards 2021	Outstanding Achievement in Sound Editing - Non-Theatrical Animation Long Form	Tess Fournier Brad Meyer Katie Jackson Timothy Vindigni John Deligiannis Carol Ma (For episode: "Schooled!")	Nominated	
2021	32nd GLAAD Media Awards	Outstanding Kids & Family Programming	The Loud House	Nominated	
2021	Kids' Choice Awards	Favorite Animated Series	The Loud House	Nominated	
2022	33rd GLAAD Media Awards	Outstanding Kids & Family Programming	The Loud House	Nominated	
2022	Kids' Choice Awards	Favorite Cartoon	The Loud House	Nominated	
2022	1st Children's and Family Emmy Awards	Outstanding Voice Performance in an Animated Program	Grey DeLisle	Nominated	
2022	1st Children's and Family Emmy Awards	Outstanding Younger Voice Performer in an Animated or Preschool Animated Program	Asher Bishop	Nominated	
2023	Kids' Choice Awards	Favorite Animated Show	The Loud House	Nominated	
2024	35th GLAAD Media Awards	Outstanding Kids and Family Programming - Animated	The Loud House	Nominated	
2024	Kids' Choice Awards	Favorite Cartoon	The Loud House	Nominated	
2025	Kidscreen Awards	Best Holiday or Special Episode - Kids	"'Twas the Fight Before Christmas"	Won	
2025	36th GLAAD Media Awards	Outstanding Kids & Family Programming or Film - Animated	The Loud House	Nominated	
2025	Kids' Choice Awards	Favorite Cartoon	The Loud House	Nominated	
2026	Kidscreen Awards	Best Holiday or Special Episode - Kids	"Close Encounters of the Nerd Kind"	Won	
