= Bubble Guppies =

Children's television series

- Genre: Children's television series; Educational; Musical; Sketch comedy; Fantasy
- Created by: Jonny Belt; Robert Scull
- Developed by: Jonny Belt; Robert Scull; Janice Burgess
- Voices of: Brianna Gentilella; Bailey Gambertoglio; Taylor Kaplan; Zachary Gordon; Teddy Walsh; Jacob Bertrand; Jay Gragnani; Quinn Breslin; Nirvaan Pal; Brody Bett; Jelani Imani; Christopher Borger; Marleik "Mar Mar" Walker; Issac Ryan Brown; Caleb Clark; Josiah Gaffney; Angelina Wahler; Selena Ann Gonzalez; Grace Kaufman; Catherine Ashmore Bradley; Zoe Glick; Reyna Shaskan; Tori Feinstein; Colby Kipnes; Mia Lynn Bangunan; Eamon Pirruccello; Jet Jurgensmeyer; AJ Kane; Eason Rytter; Leah Janvier; Frank Welker; Tino Insana; Fred Tatasciore; Chris Phillips; Kari Wahlgren; Skai Jackson; Mia Vavasseur; Kayla Erickson; Jordan Friedman
- Theme music composer: Terry Fryer
- Opening theme: "Bubble Guppies Theme Song"
- Ending theme: Various ending themes
- Composers: Nick Balaban (season 1); Michael Rubin; John Angier (additional)
- Countries of origin: United States; Canada (seasons 2–6)
- Original language: English
- No. of seasons: 6
- No. of episodes: 129 (list of episodes)

Production
- Executive producers: Jonny Belt; Robert Scull; Janice Burgess (2011–13)
- Producers: Nancy Evelyn (season 1); Lynne Warner (season 2); Allie Strawbridge (season 3); Melissa Graham (season 4); Jain Dickson (seasons 5–6)
- Running time: 22–23 minutes 44 minutes (specials)
- Production companies: Wildbrain Entertainment (season 1); Nelvana (seasons 2–4); Jam Filled Entertainment (seasons 5–6); Nickelodeon Animation Studio

Original release
- Network: Nickelodeon
- Release: January 24, 2011 – October 21, 2016
- Release: September 27, 2019 – June 30, 2023

Bubble Guppies is an animated children's fantasy television series created by Jonny Belt and Robert Scull and developed by Belt, Scull, and Janice Burgess for Nickelodeon. The series is a combination of the sketch comedy, edutainment, and musical genres, and revolves around the underwater adventures of a group of merperson preschoolers named Molly, Gil, Goby, Deema, Oona, Nonny, and new student Zooli. (Note: Zooli was introduced in season 5.) The program premiered on Nickelodeon on January 24, 2011, and ran for six seasons until June 30, 2023. The series is produced using 3D software.

The series originally ended on October 21, 2016. Almost three years after the last episode of its original run, it was revived for a fifth season on June 4, 2019 with an order of 26 episodes. The fifth season premiered on September 27, 2019. On February 19, 2020, the show was renewed for a sixth and final season, which premiered on October 19, 2021.

A spinoff web series, titled Bubble Guppies: Super Princess Mermaids (also known as "Bubble Guppies Mermaids"), premiered on February 7, 2025.

== Format and overview ==
=== Seasons 1–4 format ===
The episode starts with the show logo in a room and it is filling with water. Then the Little Fish breaks the fourth wall by saying the title of the show to the audience. The series starts with an introduction by Molly, saying 'Hi, it's me, Molly, and it's time for—' only to be stopped by Gil performing an act related to the episode's subject. One or both of the two then state 'It's time for Bubble Guppies!', and the theme song plays. After the theme song, the Little Fish say the episode's name.

An event may occur when one or more characters is on the way to school. For example, Avi breaks his tail in "Call a Clambulance!" when Oona is on the way to school. A guppy tells Mr. Grouper about the earlier experience. He suggests, "Let's think about it", and the characters discuss the theme. A pop song follows, focusing on the episode's main theme. Usually, Molly or Gil sing this song, but there are episodes where Deema or Mr. Grouper sing it instead.

One of the guppies may go to a shop that mostly focuses on the theme (example: a doctor's office in "Call a Clambulance!"). The owner of the shop (usually played by Deema) will ask questions about what they need. Jokes and silly responses will eventually lead to the correct necessity. Mr. Grouper often ends this segment by asking, "Excuse me, what time is it?" in a call and response pattern, with the guppies responding, "It's time for lunch!" three times.

At lunch, three of the characters make a food pun about the subject of the episode; usually done by Nonny. After lunch, another Gil and Molly sketch is shown.

After the sketch, some classroom activity is shown further reinforcing that episode's topic, or Mr. Grouper talks more about the theme. This is usually ended when Mr. Grouper says, "Line up everybody, it's time to go outside!" followed by the "outside song". Outside the classroom, the guppies act out a story about the theme, interfused with Adobe Flash-animated graphics. Once back inside, a dance song is typically performed. In Season 1, the dance song occurred before the story segment, and both were preceded by a second "Let's think about it" segment. After all that, Gil and Molly do another sketch.

The guppies may either go on a field trip (upon which, since Season 2, they literally yell out "FIELD TRIP!") or do a special activity that focuses on the theme. This may focus on a problem shown earlier and involves the key characters. The episode concludes with a final sketch by Gil and Molly, followed by a shorter version of the theme song. The credits then roll which include a song played earlier in that episode.

=== Seasons 5–6 format ===
Season 5 introduced a new series format which keeps the initial format, but this time has the story segment take up the majority of the episode, and incorporates the shop and lunch segments into the narrative. Gil and Molly simply introduce themselves before the theme song with no opening gag. The show cuts right to school after the theme, and the dance songs and field trips were removed. With the exception of select special episodes, Mr. Grouper's overall presence in the show was primarily reduced to the beginning class segments. Gil and Molly's sketches were removed as well, instead having Mr. Grouper wave goodbye to the viewer as the guppies go back inside.

== Characters ==
- Molly - A bubbly human guppy girl. She is the primary host of the show (along with Gil) and Gil’s best friend. Molly appears alongside Gil in the transitional segments, where she aids Gil in hopes that problems won't arise. She has tan skin, long pink hair, and brown eyes. She wears a cadet and turquoise blue striped tail and bikini. Brianna Gentilella provides her singing voice in all seasons and her speaking voice in seasons 1–2 and season 6 episodes 2–13 and from episode 15. Her speaking voice is provided by Bailey Gambertoglio in seasons 3–4 and Taylor Kaplan in seasons 5–6.
- Gil - A silly human guppy boy. He is the secondary host of the show (along with Molly) and Molly’s best friend. Gil gets scared easily, and appears alongside Molly in the transitional segments. In those segments, he often attempts to do something but with unexpected results. He has fair skin, blue sideswept hair, and blue eyes. He wears a green and forest green tail. He is voiced by Zachary Gordon in season 1–season 2 episode 2, Jacob Bertrand in season 2 episode 3–season 3, Jay Gragnani in season 4, and Quinn Breslin in seasons 5–6. His singing voice is provided by Teddy Walsh in season 2 episode 4–season 3, Nirvaan Pal in season 5 and Brody Bett in season 6.
- Goby - A friendly human guppy boy with an imaginative personality. He is also good friends with Gil. He has dark skin, curly indigo hair, and brown eyes. He wears a blue and purple tail. He is voiced by Jelani Imani in seasons 1–2, Marleik "Mar Mar" Walker in season 3, Issac Ryan Brown in season 4, Caleb Clark in season 5 episodes 1–24 and Josiah Gaffney in season 5 episode 25–season 6. His singing voice is provided by Christopher Borger in season 1 and Johntae Lipscomb in seasons 3–4.
- Deema - A jovial human guppy girl with a wild imagination and often plays the role of shopkeeper in the "store" segments. She has fair skin, large curly blonde hair, and blue eyes. She wears an orange tail and bikini with sunglow polka dots and orange earrings. She is voiced by Angelina Wahler in seasons 1–2, Grace Kaufman in seasons 3–4, Catherine Bradley in season 5 and Zoe Glick in season 6. Her singing voice is provided by Selena Gonzalez in season 1.
- Oona - A human guppy girl with a sweet personality. She has pale skin, purple pigtailed hair, and brown eyes. She wears a purple and dark purple tail and a pink star clip in her hair. She is voiced by Reyna Shaskan in seasons 1–2, Tori Feinstein in seasons 3–4, Colby Kipnes in seasons 5–6, and Mia Lynn Bangunan from season 6 episode 8.
- Nonny - A human guppy boy with an intelligent and calm personality. Despite not smiling a lot, he is the most polite and mature member of the group. He is also Oona's best friend. He is smart and helps Deema pronounce words and helps his friends answer their questions. He has fair skin, short stubby orange hair, and green eyes. He wears a green and kiwi green striped tail and blue scuba glasses. He is voiced by Eamon Pirruccello in seasons 1–2, Jet Jurgensmeyer in seasons 3–4, and AJ Kane in seasons 5–6. His singing voice is provided by Eason Rytter in season 3.
- Mr. Grouper - A big orange goldfish and the guppies' teacher. He respects the kids' imaginations, ideas, and suggestions. A prominent feature in seasons 1–4 is that he can also change his natural orange skin into a wide variety of different colors and patterns. He is voiced by Tino Insana in seasons 1–4 and Fred Tatasciore in seasons 3, 5 and 6. His singing voice is provided by Chris Phillips in seasons 1–4.
- Bubble Puppy - Gil's pet puppy and best friend. He has orange and white fur and a green collar with a yellow fish license. He is voiced by Frank Welker.
- Zooli - A human guppy girl introduced in season 5. She is an animal expert. She has dark skin, curly purple hair in a bun, and dark brown eyes. She wears a magenta and pink swirled tail and a blue seashell headband in her hair. She is voiced by Leah Janvier.
- Little Fish - A group of small orange goldfish who appear throughout each episode as guides for the viewers. They announce the episode's name and shout out the answers to viewer-response questions, as well as provide commentary in some scenes. They are voiced by Skai Jackson in seasons 1–2, Mia Vavasseur in season 3, Kayla Erickson in season 4, and Jordan Friedman in seasons 5–6.

Minor characters include a police officer named Miranda and a winged serpent named Pretzel-coatl. Heavy metal singer Ozzy Osbourne guest starred as Sid Fishy in the 2015 episode "Super Guppies!", while actor George Takei guest starred in a sci-fi mashup which pitted him as a Darth Vader-like armored villain against starship captain Gil and his first officer, Mr. Smart (Nonny). Recurring character Mr. Grumpfish is a reference to Monty Python's The Meaning of Life, while the episode "The Puppy and the Ring" makes in-jokes ranging from J. R. R. Tolkien to L. Frank Baum.

=== UK cast ===
The revived series was not dubbed for UK release, and instead, the original airs. "The Jawsome Sharkventure!", however, used the British voices for the Baby Shark's Big Show! cast.

- Molly (voiced by Abriella Bierer in seasons 1–4)
- Gil (voiced by Hayden Hunter in seasons 1–3, John Campbell in season 3, and Sam Brown in seasons 3–4)
- Oona (voiced by Harriet Perring in seasons 1–2 and Amba Bierer in seasons 3–4)
- Deema (voiced by Lauren Reichwald in seasons 1–3 and Megan North in season 4)
- Goby (voiced by Lewis Dillon in seasons 1–3 and Edward Cross in seasons 3–4)
- Nonny (voiced by Will Matthews in seasons 1–4)

== Production ==
Although it premiered on Nickelodeon in 2011, the show started production in 2009.

The series was created by the duo of Jonny Belt and Robert Scull, who had previously served as staff writers and executive producers on another Nickelodeon animated series, The Backyardigans (2004–2013), created by Janice Burgess. Burgess also developed the concept of Bubble Guppies with Belt and Scull. In addition, Belt and Scull served as supervising art director and supervising director, respectively; both were roles they held on The Backyardigans as well.

The voice cast is based in New York and California and the dialogue is recorded at New York-based Dubway Studios and Rhumba Recorders and Burbank-based Nickelodeon Animation Studio.

In addition to Nickelodeon Animation Studio, outsourced animation was provided by Wildbrain Entertainment for season 1, Nelvana for seasons 2 to 4, and Jam Filled Entertainment for seasons 5 to 6.

Originally the series ended with season 4 on October 21, 2016. In June 2019, an announcement was made that the series would return. It returned on September 27, 2019 with season 5 premiere. Season 6 premiered October 19, 2021, and ended June 30, 2023.

=== Lawsuit ===
On January 23, 2014, Debbie and Dean Rohn, business partners and spouses based in Cadillac, Michigan, filed a lawsuit in the United States District Court for the Western District of Michigan against Viacom and various stores, alleging that they had committed trademark infringement by manufacturing and selling Bubble Guppies branded clothes. In 1990, the couple had founded a small clothing business, Guppie Kids, Inc., founded with the purpose of producing yuppie-based clothing for school-aged children. Their products, branded as Guppie Kid, were produced in low quantities and had a low public profile, with the Rohns switching to an online business platform in 2005 to extend their brand recognition: several marketing and merchandising deals had either failed or never materialized prior to that point. Incomplete sales records and estimates by the plaintiffs suggested that Guppie Kid made around $12,000 throughout its lifetime, with only around $2,000 of products having been sold outside of western Michigan through the brand's website.

On January 27, 2017, Judge Janet T. Neff ruled in favor of the defendants following a motion for summary judgment. In her opinion, Neff cited factors such as the obscurity of the Guppie Kid brand indicating that no consumer confusion could occur; Bubble Guppies targeting preschool-aged children rather than the school-aged children that Guppie Kid was marketed towards, as well as substantial differences between the tie-wearing fish featured in the logo of Guppie Kids and the mermaid-inspired characters of Bubble Guppies; and lastly, the generally poor evidence of any intent to infringe provided by the plaintiffs due to how it had only supposedly begun when Viacom began to license the series to children's clothing companies, disregarding how the series had been in development for years before then. In response, the Rohns appealed the decision to the United States Court of Appeals for the Sixth Circuit: a unanimous opinion written by Judge Raymond Kethledge, issued on December 18, 2017, upheld the District Court's decision with the same rationale, and a later petition for a writ of certiorari to the Supreme Court of the United States was denied.

== Broadcast ==
The series first premiered on January 24, 2011, the second season then premiering on November 4 of the same year. Season 3 premiered on August 12, 2013, with an episode entitled, "Get Ready for School!". Season 4 premiered on May 21, 2015. Season 5 premiered on September 27, 2019 after a three year hiatus. Season 6 premiered on October 19, 2021.

During the run, the series premiered on the Nickelodeon channel. The show continues to air in reruns on the Nick Jr. Channel.

== Episodes ==
Season	Episodes	Originally released	
Season	Episodes	First released	Last released
1	20	January 24, 2011	October 24, 2011
2	19	November 4, 2011	May 1, 2013
3	24	August 12, 2013	May 19, 2015
4	14	May 21, 2015	October 21, 2016
5	18	September 27, 2019	March 5, 2021
6	34	October 19, 2021	June 30, 2023

== DVD releases ==
Title	Season(s)	Episode count	Release date	Episodes
Bubble Guppies	1–2	4	May 1, 2012	"Bubble Puppy!", "Bubble Bites!", and "Bubble Puppy's Fin-tastic Fairy Tale!"
On the Job!	1–2	6	February 5, 2013	"Call a Clambulance!", "Build Me a Building!", "The Grumpfish Special!", "Fishketball!", "Firefighter Gil to the Rescue!", and "A Tooth on the Looth!"
Sunny Days!	1–2	6	May 28, 2013	"The Legend of Pinkfoot!", "Gup, Gup and Away!", "The Beach Ball!", "The Sizzling Scampinis!", "Bubble Duckies!", and "Bring on the Bugs!"
Animals Everywhere!	1–3	6	March 11, 2014	"Ducks in a Row!", "Boy Meets Squirrel!", "The Lonely Rhino", "The Elephant Trunk-a-Dunk!", "The Arctic Life!", and "Puppy Love!"
Get Ready for School!	1–3	6	July 29, 2014	"The Moon Rocks!", "Check It Out!", "Construction Psyched!", "Good Hair Day!", "Get Ready for School!", and "Good Morning, Mr. Grumpfish!"
The Puppy and the Ring	2–3	5	June 2, 2015	"Bubble-Cadabra!", "Sir Nonny the Nice!", "The Wizard of Oz-tralia!", and "The Puppy and the Ring"
Fun on the Farm	1–3	5	May 10, 2016	"The Spring Chicken is Coming!", "Have a Cow!", "The Cowgirl Parade!", "The Bubble Bee-athalon!", and "Bubble Kitty!"
Super Guppies	1–3	5	May 16, 2017	"Haunted House Party!", "X Marks the Spot!", "The Police Cop-etition!", "The Unidentified Flying Orchestra!", and "Super Guppies!"
Bubble Puppy's Awesome Adventures	3–4	5	May 8, 2018	"The Wizard of Oz-tralia!", "Bubble Kitty!", "The New Doghouse!", "The Temple of the Lost Puppy!", and "Sheep Doggy!"
We Totally Rock!	1, 3–4	4	May 14, 2019	"We Totally Rock!", "Super Shrimptennial Celebration!", "Party at Sea!", and "Guppy Style!"

== Merchandise ==
=== Video game ===
A Bubble Guppies game was made for the Nintendo DS in 2012. Common Sense Media gave the game 3 out of 5 stars.

=== Soundtracks ===
Bubble Bops!

Soundtrack album by The Bubble Guppies Cast
- Released: September 27, 2019
- Genres: Soundtrack, children's music
- Length: 46:26
- Label: Nickelodeon Records

Track list
No.	Title	Length
1.	"Bubble Guppies Theme Song"	0:38
2.	"Outside!"	0:29
3.	"Time for Lunch!"	0:18
4.	"I Sent You a Letter"	1:39
5.	"Build Me a Building"	2:02
6.	"Go Down to a Restaurant"	1:57
7.	"Got a Bunch of Bones"	1:37
8.	"Long Time Ago"	1:29
9.	"Super, Super, Supermarkets"	1:42
10.	"A Color Just Right"	1:48
11.	"Sun, Beautiful Sun"	2:11
12.	"At the Zoo"	1:48
13.	"Once Upon a Time"	1:33
14.	"I Wanna Be a Cowgirl!"	1:52
15.	"Trucks Are Tough"	1:54
16.	"On the Beach!"	2:24
17.	"Take Me Away on a Train"	1:04
18.	"My Hair"	2:06
19.	"A Brand New Day!"	1:35
20.	"Get Ready"	1:50
21.	"This Is the Arctic Life"	1:41
22.	"A Puppy Is a Guppy's Best Friend"	1:44
23.	"Orchestra Play for Me"	1:52
24.	"Come to Your Senses"	1:46
25.	"Awesomeness of Rain"	1:50
26.	"Wash 'em Off"	1:35
27.	"Superheroes!"	1:47
28.	"In My Neighborhood"	1:28
29.	"So You Want to Be a Princess"	1:43
30.	"Hey Baby"	1:31
31.	"Off to Sleep You Go"	0:51
Total length:		46:26
