= Aubin Bradley =

American actress

- Born: New York City, New York
- Occupation: Actress
- Years active: 2019–present
- Relatives: Catherine Ashmore Bradley (sister)

Aubin Bradley is an American teen actress. She played the role of Lucy Loud in the Nickelodeon comedy television series The Really Loud House as well as its two films A Loud House Christmas and A Really Haunted Loud House where her older sister Catherine Ashmore Bradley portrays Luan Loud.

== Early life ==
Aubin Bradley was born in New York City, New York and is the younger sister of Catherine Ashmore Bradley. She moved with her family to New Jersey when she 4 years old. She made her acting debut as Little Cosette on Broadway Tour of Les Miserables.

== Career ==
In 2021, Aubin Bradley worked in the live-action television film of The Loud House titled A Loud House Christmas where she portrayed Lucy Loud while her sister Catherine plays the role of Luan Loud. Aubin and Catherine reprised their roles in the spin-off television series The Really Loud House and the second television movie A Really Haunted Loud House.

== Filmography ==
=== Film ===
Year	Title	Role	Notes
2021	40 Nickels	Sarah's Sister	Short
2021	The Girl Who Got Away	Tracey Fields	

=== Television ===
Year	Title	Role	Notes
2019	Happy!	Earnest kid	Episode: "Blitzkrieg!!!"
2019	Madam Secretary	Molly Jenkins	Episode: "Valor"
2020	Modern Love	Amber	Episode: "Am I...? Maybe This Quiz Will Tell Me"
2021	Invasion	Traumatized Child	Episode: "Last Day"
2021	A Loud House Christmas	Lucy Loud	Television film
2021	Gossip Girl	Ana	Episode: "Final Cancellation"
2022	The Watcher	Young Carol	Episode: "The Gloaming"
2022–2024	The Really Loud House	Lucy Loud	Main cast; 39 episodes
2023	Hello Tomorrow!	Jules	4 episodes
2023	A Really Haunted Loud House	Lucy Loud	Television film
