= The Really Loud House =

American sitcom

- Genre: Sitcom
- Based on: Characters created by Chris Savino
- Developed by: Tim Hobert
- Starring: Wolfgang Schaeffer; Jahzir Bruno; Eva Carlton; Sophia Woodward; Catherine Ashmore Bradley; Annaka Fourneret; Aubin Bradley; Lexi Janicek; Ella Allan; Mia Allan; Jolie Jenkins; Brian Stepanek
- Theme music composer: Michelle Lewis; Doug Rockwell; Chris Savino
- Opening theme: "In the Really Loud House"
- Composers: Gabriel Mann; Niv Toar
- Country of origin: United States
- Original language: English
- No. of seasons: 2
- No. of episodes: 39

Production
- Executive producers: Tim Hobert; Jonathan Judge; Michael Rubiner; Michael Hobert; David McHugh & Matt Flanagan
- Producers: Don Dunn; Angela Yarbrough; Melanie Kirk (S1); Debra Spidell (S2)
- Production location: Albuquerque, New Mexico
- Cinematography: Brandon Mastrippolito; Greg Matthews
- Editors: Jeff Wright; Gregory Hobson; Josh Rifkin; Katie M. Best
- Camera setup: Single-camera
- Running time: 22 minutes (regular); 43 minutes ("A Musical to Remember" only)
- Production companies: 93rd Street Productions; Quick to Judge; Nickelodeon Productions

Original release
- Network: Nickelodeon
- Release: November 3, 2022 – November 26, 2024

Related
- The Loud House

The Really Loud House is an American sitcom developed by Tim Hobert that aired on Nickelodeon from November 3, 2022 to November 26, 2024. It is a live-action spin-off of the animated series The Loud House, created by Chris Savino, and the third television series in the overall franchise, utilizing most of the actors that appeared in the 2021 television film A Loud House Christmas, including Wolfgang Schaeffer, Jahzir Bruno, Sophia Woodward, Catherine Ashmore Bradley, Aubin Bradley, Lexi Janicek, Ella Allan, Mia Allan, Lexi DiBenedetto, and Brian Stepanek, with Eva Carlton, Annaka Fourneret, August Michael Peterson, and Jolie Jenkins joining the cast.

In April 2023, the series was renewed for a second and final season and was greenlit for a Halloween television film titled A Really Haunted Loud House. The film premiered on September 28, 2023.

== Premise ==
Much like the cartoon series, this live-action adaptation portrays 12-year old Lincoln Loud surviving in a house of ten sisters where chaos typically reigns. Lincoln also journeys on adventures with his best friend Clyde McBride throughout the town of Royal Woods, Michigan.

== Cast ==
=== Main ===
- Wolfgang Schaeffer as Lincoln Loud, the middle son of the Loud family and the only boy
- Jahzir Bruno as Clyde McBride, Lincoln's best friend
- Eva Carlton as Leni Loud, Lincoln's airhead but fashionable older sister
- Sophia Woodward as Luna Loud, Lincoln's older sister who is a musician
- Catherine Ashmore Bradley as Luan Loud, Lincoln's comedic older sister who owns a dummy named Mr. Coconuts
- Annaka Fourneret as Lynn Loud Jr., Lincoln's athletic older sister
- Aubin Bradley as Lucy Loud, Lincoln's gothic younger sister
- Lexi Janicek as Lisa Loud, Lincoln's gifted younger sister
- Ella Allan as Lola Loud, Lincoln's glamorous younger sister and Lana's twin
- Mia Allan as Lana Loud, Lincoln's tomboyish younger sister and Lola's twin
- Jolie Jenkins as Rita Loud, the matriarch of the Loud family
- Brian Stepanek as Lynn Loud Sr., the patriarch of the Loud family and proprietor of Lynn's Table
  - Brian Stepanek also voices Robot Todd, Lisa's robot assistant (Note: Brian Stepanek's voice role of Robot Todd is credited in the "featuring" section of the end credits.)

=== Recurring ===
- Lexi DiBenedetto as Lori Loud, the eldest daughter of the Loud family who attends Fairway University
- August Michael Peterson as Lily Loud, the youngest member of the Loud family
- Stephen Guarino as Howard McBride, one of Clyde's dads
- Ray Ford as Harold McBride, one of Clyde's dads
- Gavin Maddox Bergman as Liam Hunnicutt, a friend of Lincoln who lives on a farm
- Nolan Maddox as Rusty Spokes, a friend of Lincoln
- Mateo Castel as Zach Gurdle, a friend of Lincoln who is a conspiracy theorist
- Bella Blanding as Charlie Uggo, an African-American girl with a French last name from Tennessee who was Lincoln's crush from "The Blemish Dilemish" to "The Tennessee Surprise: Love Is in the Air"
- Damian Alonso as Bobby Santiago, the boyfriend of Lori
- Sanjana Rajagopalan as Zia, an athletic Indian-American girl who is Lynn's friend and Lincoln's later crush

== Production ==
On March 24, 2022, a live-action series of The Loud House was originally announced for Paramount+. Most of the main cast members of A Loud House Christmas were set to reprise their roles for the series, including Wolfgang Schaeffer as Lincoln and Jahzir Bruno as Clyde. On May 26, 2022, it was announced that Leni, Lynn, and Rita were recast for the series (although Rita's previous actress, Muretta Moss, was originally set to reprise her role) and that Eva Carlton, Annaka Fourneret, and Jolie Jenkins would replace Dora Dolphin, Morgan McGill, and Moss in the respective roles, along with another announcement that Lexi DiBenedetto would reprise her role as Lori. Filming for the series began in Albuquerque, New Mexico in June 2022. On September 4, 2022, it was announced that the series, entitled The Really Loud House, would premiere on Nickelodeon in November 2022. On October 5, 2022, it was announced that the series would premiere on November 3, 2022.

On April 4, 2023, the series was renewed for a 20-episode second season, along with a Halloween television film titled A Really Haunted Loud House. Filming for the second season was set to begin on June 5, 2023, but on May 24, 2023, production on the second season was shut down because of the picketing for the 2023 Writers Guild of America strike.

Following the conclusion of the strikes, filming for the second season began in Albuquerque in December 2023. On January 16, 2024, it was announced that the second season would premiere on February 19, 2024.

On October 18, 2024, it was announced the series would end after two seasons. The finale aired November 26, 2024.

== Episodes ==
=== Series overview ===
Season	Episodes	Originally released	
Season	Episodes	First released	Last released
1	20	November 3, 2022	June 29, 2023
2	19	February 19, 2024	November 26, 2024

=== Season 1 (2022–23) ===
No. overall	No. in season	Title	Directed by	Written by	Original release date	Prod. code	U.S. viewers (millions)
1	1	"The Macho Man With the Plan"	Jonathan Judge	Tim Hobert	November 3, 2022	101	0.22
Lynn Loud Sr.'s half-birthday is coming up. Due to the fact that Lucy has been up for 52 hours watching a scary movie for her Morticians Club meeting, Lynn Sr. and Rita instate a new rule where everyone has to be in bed by midnight. This affects Lincoln's plans to obtain a Macho Medal which will be obtained during a Rip Hardcore marathon where a special code must be entered by that time. To pull it off, Lincoln and Clyde help Lincoln's sisters through their different problems which goes well. When it comes to taking Lynn Sr. out to Jean Juan's French-Mex for his half-birthday dinner, Lincoln persuades Lisa to have her robot Todd pose as him. Guest stars: Lexi DiBenedetto as Lori, August Michael Peterson as Lily, Miles Burris as Rip Hardcore
2	2	"The Chore Thing"	Melissa Kosar	Tim Hobert	November 10, 2022	102	0.21
Saturday is Chore Day at the Loud House and Lynn Sr. works to make sure his kids are doing their jobs while Rita covers the story of the town librarian shaving his moustache. Lynn Sr. has Lincoln do the yard work after Clyde unknowingly mentions how Lincoln gets out of it. Lincoln enlists Lana to speed up the riding mower's engine which goes too fast. The two end up in trouble with Police Chief Wellington who ends up dragging them on a ride-along that involves going after the dairy kingpin Milkshake Marty and his Custard Gang when they hijack Auntie Pam's ice cream truck. Meanwhile, Lisa works to clean the toilet with her Zapmaster 3000. Lola and Lucy get trapped in the basement with a supposed half-goat half-serpent Mesopotamian monster from one of the horror movies they were watching there as everyone else starts getting locked in the basement with them one by one. Lily goes missing from Lynn Sr.'s supervision as he struggles to find her. Guest stars: August Michael Peterson as Lily, Ray Ford as Harold McBride, Stephen Guarino as Howard McBride, Keeshan Giles as Chief Wellington, Stephen Kramer Glickman as Milkshake Marty
3	3	"The Blemish Dilemish"	David Kendall	Michael Hobert	November 17, 2022	104	0.19
The Action News Team work to find a story where they are instructed by Ms. Tyte to give an interview to Charlie Uggo who happens to be a girl that just moved in from Tennessee as Lincoln gets smitten by her while suffering from a butt pimple at the same time. He finds that Charlie has the same hobbies as he works to impress her with Leni, Luna, and Luan's help. Meanwhile, Lynn Sr. works to treat everyone's ailments as Rita states that they need to find a doctor who can help them 24/7. They meet a doctor named Dr. Simmons who moved into the neighborhood as they work to befriend him to avoid the astronomical medical expenses that come with their children. Guest stars: Brian George as Dr. Simmons, Gavin Maddox Bergman as Liam Hunnicut, Nolan Maddox as Rusty Spokes, Mateo Castel as Zach Gurdle, Trinity Jo-Li Bliss as Stella Zhau, Bella Blanding as Charlie Uggo
4	4	"The Banana Split Decision"	David Kendall	David McHugh & Matt Flanagan	November 24, 2022	106	0.22
Lynn Loud Sr. and Rita Loud go to the parent-teacher conferences where they promise to order them an ice cream special called Auntie Pam's Banana Split in a Canoe if there are more good reviews than bad. They go back and forth between the schools to hear each of the teachers' reviews. When each of the sisters are divided by positive reviews and negative reviews, Lincoln works to get his essay in to Mr. Bolhofner so that his decision can make the deciding vote. Guest stars: Clyde Kusatsu as Mr. Yanaga, Brian Thomas Smith as Mr. Bolhofner
5	5	"Ro-Bro"	Phill Lewis	Angela Yarbrough	December 1, 2022	103	0.12
Lincoln notes to Clyde about how 18-year-olds get all the older video games like "Blood, Bath and Beyond: Deathfest 7". Inspired by a fellow student's cool older brother, Lincoln gives Lisa the idea to help him out. This leads to Lisa and Todd constructing a robot for him called the Ro-Bro 5000. He does things with Lincoln like taking him on a trip to places in 19 minutes, helping him with his homework, getting a discus back from Mr. Grouse's yard, and getting "Blood, Bath and Beyond: Deathfest 7". Ro-Bro 5000 considers Clyde to be a nerd and starts causing problems for him. Meanwhile, Lynn Sr. throws out his neck and tries to do a relaxing method in the bathroom where his attempts to get relaxed keeps getting thwarted by his daughters' different activities. Guest star: Jack Griffo as Ro-Bro
6	6	"I Wanna Hold Your Hand"	Melissa Kosar & Jonathan Judge	Amy Pittman	December 8, 2022	108	0.19
Royal Woods Middle School is having a school dance called the Kangaroo Hop as Liam works on his first documentary of it for the Action News where Lori had gotten a crown while Rita only got second place to Brenda Wilkinson. With Rusty still hanging with Charlie, Lincoln does another attempt to impress her as Lori gives advice causes Lynn to think that Lori jinxed him as he starts bungling much to the dismay of Lori. Howard and Harold hook Clyde up with their chiropractor's daughter Marnie Steppenberg. Lynn Sr. works on appetizers for the pre-Kangaroo Hop party and works to get feedback from the attendees. Guest stars: Lexi DiBenedetto as Lori, Ray Ford as Harold McBride, Stephen Guarino as Howard McBride, Gavin Maddox Bergman as Liam Hunnicut, Nolan Maddox as Rusty Spokes, Mateo Castel as Zach Gurdle, Bella Blanding as Charlie Uggo, Brian Anderson as AJ Squaredaway
7	7	"The Guy Who Makes You Fly"	Jonathan Judge	Peter Limm	January 5, 2023	107	0.20
Lincoln tells Clyde that he will be spending his vacation from his family at Aunt Ruth's cabin meaning that he won't be able to attend his sleepover. Clyde offers to fill in for Lincoln while he is away where Lincoln will partake in another sleepover if Clyde succeeds. He works to do things like helping Lynn get the trash talking out of her system, helping Luna with writing a tune for Sound Cloud when she suffers from writer's block, informing Rita about Luna not cleaning her part of the room, and helping Leni with her boyfriend Chase who likes the things Lynn Sr. does instead of doing homework with her. When it all goes wrong, Clyde has to turn to Lincoln to get everything back on track. Guest stars: Ricardo Hurtado as Chase, Joe Nieves as Chase Sr.
8	8	"The Manager With the Planager"	Phill Lewis	David McHugh & Matt Flanagan	January 12, 2023	105	0.17
At the Royal Woods Pavilion, Clyde watches a drumming group called the Bucket Bashers as Lincoln knows about Clyde's secret drumming and plans to give him the push to ask them by becoming Clyde's manager. Clyde states that he has never drummed in front of people as Lincoln works to help him get over it through whatever way possible through different practice gigs. Meanwhile, Luan informs Lynn Sr. that legendary comedian Joan Shivers is performing her retirement show at Sunset Canyon Retirement Home where she has become the opening act as Joan later gives Luan some constructive criticism that causes her to consider quitting comedy. After getting extra credit from Mr. Rickshaw, Leni plans to get an A on her upcoming history oral report on Calvin Coolidge for Mr. Rickshaw as Luna helps her study. Guest stars: Vicki Lawrence as Joan Shivers, Phill Lewis as Mr. Rickshaw
9	9	"Heart and Soul"	Jonathan Judge	Tim Hobert	January 19, 2023	111	0.20
Lincoln and Clyde plan a catapult system for Lincoln to participate so that they can beat Liam's record. Meanwhile, Rita finds out that Lynn Sr. let Lucy, Lana, Lola, Lisa, and Lily stay up all night to watch The Vampires of Melancholia. After hearing the respectful arguments, Lucy, Lola, Lisa, and Lana follow the stages that follow which doesn't go according to their plans. At the same time, Luna gets outdone at the Burnt Bean by visiting pop star Kiki Carlyle and works on making a ClikClok video with help from Lily and Todd. Guest stars: August Michael Peterson as Lily, Jayden Bartels as Kiki Carlyle, Justin Allan as Young Lincoln, Ava Torres as Young Luna, Anthony LeBlanc as Barista/MC
10	10	"No Louds Allowed"	Jonathan Judge	Michael Hobert	January 26, 2023	112	0.27
Lincoln finds his room constantly intruded by his sisters. Upon being displeased about the infringement on them entering his room as he is the only one who doesn't have a roommate, Lincoln works to make the attic a new hangout for him and Clyde. They start the exclusive Rad Retro Room where his sisters aren't on the list. This causes Lincoln's sisters to retaliate by starting their own exclusive clubs where Leni and Luna start the L2 Lounge in their backyard, Lucy and Lisa start an other-dimensional club in the basement, and Lynn and Lana start a sports club where they gain assistance in running the power there from Tony Hawk following a blackout. Meanwhile, Lynn Sr. and Rita work to get Lily to go to sleep when she ends up on a sleep strike. Guest stars: August Michael Peterson as Lily, Tony Hawk as himself
11	11	"The Princess and the Everlasting Emerald: A Royal Woods Fairytale (Part 1)"	Jonathan Judge	Alan Yanaga	February 2, 2023	109	0.12
Lincoln tells Lily a bedtime story. In this fairy tale, Lincoln learns from Charlie that her family is about to move back to Tennessee, so he decides to get her the Everlasting Emerald to remember him by. Unfortunately, it is $57,000.00 at Flip's Food & Fuel. At the same time, Lynn Sr. can't find anyone to join him in Charity Week since Luna has a gig at The Burnt Bean, Luan has an open mic night at Mike's House of Mike, Lynn is partaking in a soccer tournament, Lola has a pageant, and Lily's away with Pop Pop. To rack up the money he needs to obtain the emerald, Lincoln must team up with his family and Flip to raise enough money to save Flip's Food & Fuel when Flip's successful brother, Walter Philipini, is coming to town, as Flip had lied to him about the reason for borrowing money from him. To pull it off, Flip has Rita pose as his wife where he has Lucy be Luan, Lana be Lola, and Lisa and Leni be each other since he cannot get their names right. In addition, Flip has Lynn Sr. locked in the basement during the family's dinner with Walter. The same thing happens to Luna, Luan, Lynn, and Lola when they come back from their activities early. Guest stars: Stephen Tobolowsky as Walter Phillipini, Kevin Chamberlin as Flip Phillipini, August Michael Peterson as Lily Loud, Bella Blanding as Charlie Uggo
12	12	"The Princess and the Everlasting Emerald: A Royal Woods Fairytale (Part 2)"	Jonathan Judge	Tim Hobert & Alan Yanaga	February 9, 2023	110	0.16
Continuing his fairy tale to Lily, Lincoln mentions about Walter staying for one more day and things getting worse in the basement. Due to Charlie leaving earlier, Lincoln sends Clyde to pull every trick to delay the departure. Flip's act is given away when Lynn Sr. comes clean about the truth causing Walter to have Flip's Food & Fuel bulldozed by sundown if the money he gave Flip isn't paid back by then. After Lincoln tells his family about Charlie moving back to Tennessee, the Loud family puts on a charity event called Loud-A-Palooza where Luna, Luan, Lynn, and Lola escape from the basement upon hearing about it, Lori arriving from Fairway University to help out, and Liam getting involved by offering people horse rides with his horse Lightning Bolt. The Loud family must raise enough money to save Flip's Food & Fuel, enable Lincoln to get the Everlasting Emerald, and give it to Charlie before the Uggo family leave Royal Woods. Guest stars: Lexi DiBenedetto as Lori Loud, August Michael Peterson as Lily Loud, Bella Blanding as Charlie Uggo, Gavin Maddox Bergman as Liam Hunnicut, Kevin Chamberlin as Flip Phillipini, Stephen Tobolowsky as Walter Phillipini
13	13	"What's a Mother to Redo"	Jonathan Judge	Alan Yanaga	June 1, 2023	119	0.13
On Mother's Day, the plans to celebrate it with Rita don't go according to plan due to the lime juice causing the hot breakfast fajitas to spill on Rita. Now that Rita's burns have healed, Lynn Sr. leads his children into having a Mother's Day do-over much to Rita's objection. While Lincoln and Clyde documenting the event, different things happen like Howard and Harold hooking Lynn Sr. up with their friend Alizae in order to get a spa package for the premiere spa that she is the proprietor of, Lisa and Lily needing Rita to take them to the grocery store to get ingredients for her favorite cake since Lynn Sr. is away, Lana working to swat the fly that was bothering Rita, Lori, Leni, and Luna working on a show detailing Rita's life where they compete to see who will portray Rita, Luan competing with Lucy in a tap-off to see who will do a tap-dancing event for Rita, Lola organizing Rita's closet, and Lynn putting Rita through an obstacle course. Guest stars: Lexi DiBenedetto as Lori Loud, Ray Ford as Harold McBride, Stephen Guarino as Howard McBride, August Michael Peterson as Lily Loud, Georgina Elizabeth Okon as Alizae
14	14	"Better Together"	Daniella Eisman	Audrey Hobert	June 8, 2023	117	0.14
Lincoln and Clyde prepare for the spitball war where they will be going up against Liam and Rusty. Clyde's passing of the test has Principal Ramirez transfer him to the program B.E.T.R. (short for Bright Exceptional Talented and Remarkable) run by Dr. Forest Harlow. After failing to get into the B.E.T.R. program himself upon choking on it which caused him to be held back, Lincoln works to find a way to get Clyde out of the B.E.T.R. program so that they can beat Liam and Rusty in the spitball war. Meanwhile, Lynn Sr. gets the "Little Baby Bunny" song from Johnny Rabbit stuck in his head while tending to a sick Lily as he works to get it out of his head with help Leni, Luan, Lucy, Lana, and Lola. Guest stars: Stephen Guarino as Howard McBride, Ray Ford as Harold McBride, August Michael Peterson as Lily, Gavin Maddox Bergman as Liam Hunnicut, Nolan Maddox as Rusty Spokes, Brian Thomas Smith as Mr. Bolhofner, Susie Castillo as Principal Ramirez, Peter Diseth as Dr. Forest Harlow
15	15	"Home Is Where the Hero Is"	Carlos González	David McHugh & Matt Flanagan	June 15, 2023	113	0.16
Lincoln interviews Lynn Sr. about his heroic actions as part of a contest where the winner will read the report on Rip Hardcore's show. He and Clyde win the contest and are visited by a Rip Hardcore impersonator since the real one is unavailable. Lynn Sr. becomes Dad Hardcore to spend the day with Lincoln and Clyde with comical results until Rip Hardcore shows up. Meanwhile at the Green Tee Golf Course, Lori ends up going up against Taylor Wedge of Smacktauk University during Great Acres Regional Championship and flees back to Royal Woods. After answering Lori's phone where Taylor is on the other side, Lynn fakes getting a higher score at the Green Tee Golf Course to reignite Lori's competitive fire so that she can beat Taylor. Rita finds a free massage ticket in the laundry that will expire soon and has to put her plans for it aside when Leni can't find her sunglasses. Guest stars: Lexi DiBenedetto as Lori Loud, Miles Burris as Rip Hardcore, Brittany Bardwell as Taylor Wedge
16	16	"Spelling and Doorbelling"	Jonathan Judge	Peter Limm	June 15, 2023	115	0.12
Lincoln and Clyde partake in a ding dong ditch as they plan to do it on Mr. Grouse. Luan tells them about the time how she tried to do a mailbox prank on Mr. Grouse. They soon learn why Luan considers Mr. Grouse difficult to prank as they end up in a prank war with him. Luan offers to help them beat Mr. Grouse in a prank war. Meanwhile, Lisa plans to join an after-school baseball team as Lynn finds her competing in a spelling version of it that involves getting the spelling of a word right which is overseen by Miss Allegra. Lynn offers to help Lisa by coaching her spelling baseball team with Lynn Sr.'s help. Guest stars: August Michael Peterson as Lily Loud, Peter Breitmayer as Mr. Grouse
17	17	"Sweet Dreams Are Made of Cheese"	Carlos González	Angela Yarbrough	June 22, 2023	114	0.14
A day in the Loud House starts with Leni holding the refrigerator door open, Lynn Sr. not wanting Lily to ride a scooter, Rita trying to get Lana and Lola to eat broccoli, Lisa trying to train her hamster Mr. Nibbles, Luan being unable to find Mr. Coconuts, Luna cancelling the recording her toothpaste jingle, and Lynn preparing for a sporting event. Lincoln and Clyde are greeting by Haiku, Boris, Dante who are meeting with Lucy for "show and scare". Boris tells the story of the cheese made from the milk of a mad cow. The information is incomplete due to a missing page. Thinking that the cheese gives them super powers, Lincoln has Clyde bake it into a cheesecake as they let it stand for 15 minutes until the missing page is found revealing that it induces the 100 year sleepiness. Everyone comes home first and eats the cheesecake. With help from the Morticians Club, Lincoln and Clyde must enter everyone's nightmares to wake them up before sundown. Guest stars: August Michael Peterson as Lily Loud, Joshua Gallup as Boris, Max Malas as Dante, Hannah Alltmont as Haiku, Jack McQuaid as Mr. Coconuts
18	18	"All Fair in Love and Sleepovers"	Jonathan Judge	David S. Rosenthal	June 22, 2023	116	0.09
Lincoln and Clyde are holding a slumber party with Liam, Rusty, and Zach. Using different technologies, Lincoln brings Charlie along for the sleepover. Lincoln and Charlie's pair-ups in the different activities start to cause Clyde to be jealous enough to enlist Lola to audition for a new best friend. Lori is planning to re-enact her first date with Bobby as she works to keep him from getting involved with Lincoln's slumber party. Having developed a crush on Luna, Liam helps her out in writing a country song. Luan takes up dramatic acting as she creates different characters as she helps Lori to win back Bobby. Guest stars: Lexi DiBenedetto as Lori Loud, Bella Blanding as Charlie Uggo, Damian Alonso as Bobby Santiago, Mateo Castel as Zach Gurdle, Gavin Maddox Bergman as Liam Hunnicut, Nolan Maddox as Rusty Spokes
19	19	"Some Buddy to Love"	Daniella Eisman	John Dale	June 29, 2023	118	0.15
Lynn Sr. and Rita oversleep and get the kids ready for school only to learn from an arriving Clyde that it is Saturday as it is also mentioned that Leni took Lily to visit Pop-Pop. To get a day of relaxing, Lynn Sr. and Rita establish Buddy Day where the kids are paired up through a lottery machine and must learn more about each other by the end of the day or else they will be punished. Lucy is paired up with Lisa, Lana is paired up with Lola, Luna is paired up with Luan, and Lincoln is paired up with Lynn. As each of the kids struggle to learn more about each other, Lynn Sr. and Rita struggle to plan an event that they can do.
20	20	"Little-ol-lady-whoooo Has Talent"	Jonathan Judge	Tim Hobert & Alan Yanaga	June 29, 2023	120	0.12
The 84th Annual Royal Woods Kids Have Talent Competition is occurring as the Loud family works to beat the Torkelson family who have beaten them many times. Howard and Harold McBride are hosting the Royal Woods Talent Competition. As the only person to not have a worthy talent, Lincoln enlists Clyde to help him find a talent only to end up competing with Clyde in yodeling until they compete with Thor Torkelson. Each of the Loud sisters struggle to perfect their acts. When it comes to the night of the event, each of the Loud children and Clyde struggle to come out on top against their opponents. Guest stars: Lexi DiBenedetto as Lori Loud, Ray Ford as Harold McBride, Stephen Guarino as Howard McBride, August Michael Peterson as Lily Loud, Jim Garrity as Fred Torkelson

=== Season 2 (2024) ===
No. overall	No. in season	Title	Directed by	Written by	Original release date	Prod. code	U.S. viewers (millions)
21	1	"A Musical to Remember"	Jonathan Judge	David McHugh & Matt Flanagan	February 19, 2024; February 28, 2024 (serialized version)	201	0.13
21	1	"A Musical to Remember"	Jonathan Judge	David McHugh & Matt Flanagan	February 19, 2024; February 28, 2024 (serialized version)	202	0.13
In this musical episode, the last day of Summer is approaching. Clyde is returning from 3 weeks from French camp as Lincoln plans to pack in a full time of summer in one day. Unfortunately, Lincoln unknowingly eats some of Lisa's memory-erasing jelly beans that she previously gave Mr. Nibbles. Dr. Simmons is called in where he diagnoses Lincoln with amnesia as he claims that they must sing to him to refresh his memory by sunset or else his memories will be gone forever. Meanwhile, Lori hasn't found the right time to tell her family that she will be leaving Fairway University and moving back home as she questions her decision with Bobby. Also, Lana and Lola have noticed that they have grown in their two top teeth. Guest stars: Lexi DiBenedetto as Lori Loud, August Michael Peterson as Lily Loud, Damian Alonso as Bobby, Brian George as Dr. Simmons
22	2	"The Tennessee Surprise: Love Is in the Air"	Jonathan Judge	Audrey Hobert	March 6, 2024	209	N/A
Lincoln, Clyde, Charlie, Mr. Bolhofner, and a kid are in a runaway hot air balloon. One month ago, Lincoln tells Clyde that Charlie's birthday is coming up and that they should join the debate team which takes place on the debate as they persuade Mr. Bolhofner to let them join. He also declined some calls from Charlie so that he won't spoil a surprise for her. When the debate tournament is cancelled, Lincoln persuades Mr. Bolhofner to take him and Clyde to Tennessee to see Charlie where Lincoln finds that Charlie due to his soft spot with love. Upon arrival in Tennessee following some setbacks, Lincoln finds Charlie with a boy named Marcus who is her new boyfriend. Meanwhile, Lynn Sr. has the rest of the Loud sisters be given Lily-based tasks that can't be traded when it comes to tending to Lily much to the annoyance of Rita who is on a deadline to finish an article. Guest stars: August Michael Peterson as Lily Loud, Brian Thomas Smith as Mr. Bolhofner, Bella Lorraine Blanding as Charlie Uggo, Tommy Snider as Officer Tryber
23	3	"Last Friend Standing"	Carlos González	Michael Hobert	March 13, 2024	205	0.09
It has been a month since Lincoln has learned that Charlie has started dating Marcus. Lincoln has been sulking in his bedroom as Clyde tries to cheer him up. After her team scored a victory, Lynn mentions that she has been invited to a sleepover even though she hasn't been one in a while since someone always ends up in the hospital. As Lincoln is not up to helping to come up with a plan to help Lynn, Luna, Luan, Lana, Lola, and Lisa work to come up with a plan without him. Though Lincoln gets an idea to get a new girlfriend from one of the sleepover attendants from Clyde and comes up with a plan to have the sleepover held at the Loud House. Once "Operation: Clean Sweep" begins, Lynn invites her team in consisting of Amber D., Amber K., Katie, Tiffany, and Zia as they work to make sure that Lynn's sleepover goes off without a hitch which becomes difficult when it comes to an incident that incites a pillow fight. Guest stars: August Michael Peterson as Lily Loud, Sanjana Rajagopalan as Zia
24	4	"Louder by the Dozen"	Daniella Eisman	Peter Limm	March 20, 2024	206	0.08
In the past few months, the Loud House has been kicked up a notch when Lynn's new friend Zia has been hanging out. The entire Loud family has enjoyed her company, except for Clyde. Clyde has been jealous that Zia has taken over his position of the "12th Loud". When Lori comes home, she meets Zia who got on to the Sister Group Chat. Clyde claims that Zia is taking his place in the Loud House as he is too depressed to leave Lincoln's room. As Clyde is devastated for the past two days, Lincoln enlists Liam, Rusty, and Zach to help only for them to get attracted to Lori's friends during the Loud family pool party causing Clyde to retreat to his house. Guest stars: Lexi DiBenedetto as Lori Loud, August Michael Peterson as Lily Loud, Sanjana Rajagopalan as Zia, Gavin Maddox Bergman as Liam Hunnicut, Mateo Castel as Zach Gurdle, Nolan Maddox as Rusty Spokes
25	5	"Nice Guys Finish First"	Jonathan Judge	Alan Yanaga	June 3, 2024	203	0.10
Lincoln has developed a crush on Zia which Lynn is not comfortable with. Clyde suggests to Lincoln that he should ask Lynn if he can date Zia. Though Lynn won't allow it causing Lincoln to challenge her to a contest where Lincoln's victory will allow him to ask Zia out and Lynn's victory having Lincoln not asking Lynn the question again. Meanwhile, Rita is going out of town on a girls' trip as Lynn Sr. is instructed to get Lily potty trained, not to let Leni go anywhere outside of school while she is grounded, making sure Lisa has her playdate due to her being anti-social, and to keep Lana and Lola from adopting a stray cat that entered the house and scratched one of Rita's clothes. As Lily's potty training is difficult due to her being hooked on the Poopy Panda diaper brand, Lana and Lola try to bribe Lynn Sr. into adopting the stray cat in exchange for their help while Leni tries to bribe Lynn Sr. to unground her in exchange for helping to get Lisa to not be anti-social. Guest stars: August Michael Peterson as Lily Loud, Sanjana Rajagopalan as Zia
26	6	"Loud Family Court: The Flames of Justice"	Jonathan Judge	Amy Pittman	June 4, 2024	210	0.08
Lincoln gets up early in the morning and ends up having to put out a kitchen fire. As his awakened sisters claimed that Lincoln started the fire, Lynn Sr. uses his lie detector skills to find out if Lincoln started the fire as he states that he found the kitchen on fire which he put out. To solve this issue, Lynn Sr. and Rita initiate the Loud Family Court as Clyde becomes Lincoln's lawyer. Lynn Sr. acts as the judge, Rita acts the bailiff after being denied a turn at being a judge, Leni acts as the prosecutor after watching Legally Blonde and Legally Blonde 2: Red, White and Blonde, Luna provides the music, Luan provides court commentary, and Todd is the court reporter. If nobody is found guilty, everybody is found guilty. The penalty for burning down the kitchen will have the guilty party be grounded forever and have to clean the kitchen with a tiny toothbrush. Clyde works to prove Lincoln's innocence.
27	7	"Get Out of Dodgeball"	Carlos González	Angela Yarbrough	June 5, 2024	204	0.05
Lincoln mentions how he and Clyde worked to get out of gym class due to dodgeballs. They had gotten out of gym because Coach Keck was injured upon the gymnasium's shingles falling on her causing them to counter every moves from the bullies. Clyde managed to get him and Lincoln tickets to Rip Hardcore's Wild Animal Spectacular where they disobey the rule not to bring food into the expedition causing a hawk to attack a kid who was injured by Lincoln and Clyde unknowingly throwing their corn dogs on him. As a result, a new Rip Hardcore is now hosting his show as they run into the previous Rip Hardcore (whose real name is Stanley Bunch as the studio owns the Rip Hardcore name) in the dumpster. To make it up for Stanley, Lincoln allows Stanley to bunk at the Loud House. When Stanley becomes too awesome for the Loud family, Lincoln and Clyde are soon trained by him to improve themselves in middle school. Guest stars: Miles Burris as Rip Hardcore / Stanley Bunch, Stevie Baggs Jr. as Travis
28	8	"Louds in Love"	Daniella Eisman	Tim Hobert	June 10, 2024	207	0.08
Valentine's Day is in the Loud House. Love is in the air, but Lynn Sr. and Rita are down. Lana and Lola investigate why their parents are down as they get help from Lucy where one reason behind it is involves the lack of money according to Lisa and two people named Pierre and Colette. Lincoln prepares for his date with Zia as he is nervous about being alone with her. Clyde is preparing for his Valentine's Day picture with his dads and ends up helping him out by bribing a activism girl named Kiersten to be his date at the last minute. Lori is given a sculpture from Bobby made from mercado items due to not having any money to get her a real gift. Luna works on a song for Sam as she wonders if it is good enough. Luan takes an interest in her fellow mime artist Scottie when working on an upcoming school performance. Leni has no boyfriend as she gives advice to her siblings. Guest stars: Lexi DiBenedetto as Lori Loud, Sanjana Rajagopalan as Zia, Damian Alonso as Bobby, Angelina Melodee Boris as Sam Sharp, Stephen Full as Phillipe, Merrick Hanna as Scotty, Sophie Knapp as Kiersten
29	9	"The Other Man With Better Plans"	Jonathan Judge	John Dale	June 11, 2024	208	0.09
Lincoln, Clyde, Liam, Rusty, and Zach are spending a boys weekend while drinking milk from Liam's cow Betsy. Lynn is away with Zia at a soccer convention where they aren't allowed to bring their cell phones. Because Zia didn't lock her phone, Rusty tempts Lincoln into reading the messages from a man from the mall named Chad. Lincoln's friends assume that Zia is being stolen by Chad who calls himself a man with better plans leading to a series of misunderstandings. Meanwhile, Luan does another attempt with Scotty as she has not seen him outside of his mime outfit causing Lori and Leni to find where Scotty lives and find out what he looks like outside of his mime makeup. Guest stars: Lexi DiBenedetto as Lori Loud, Gavin Maddox Bergman as Liam Hunnicut, Mateo Castel as Zach Gurdle, Nolan Maddox as Rusty Spokes, Stephen Full as Phillipe, Merrick Hanna as Scotty, Jackson Dollinger as Chad
30	10	"McCloud vs. Machine"	Carlos González	Michael Hobert	June 12, 2024	211	N/A
Lincoln and Clyde are working on a script for their movie Robot Wars. In need of money to make it, they head out to get jobs. One week later, Lincoln and Clyde have gotten jobs at a sandwich restaurant called Denunzio's Subs. During one of their deliveries, they find that a robot called GoBox is doing the deliveries to people from Denunzio's Subs. They are told by their boss Mr. Kim that artificial intelligence is the wave of the future. Mr. Kim tells them that if they can outdo GoBox, they will keep their jobs. Meanwhile, Luan texts people her jokes and they keep sending her LOL responses and retaliates by lecturing them. While wondering why Rita has been turning down his foot rubs, Lynn Sr. has his daughters be honest with each other which goes horribly awry. Guest stars: Eddie Shin as Mr. Kim, Aly Sykes as Brenda
31	11	"Loud Blues"	Carlos González	Angela Yarbrough	June 17, 2024	213	N/A
Following Lincoln and Clyde's work on a Top Gun play done by Howard and Harold McBride, Lily can't find her plush unicorn. To keep her satisfied, Lincoln gives her Bun-Bun which impresses Zia. Though he has been unable to sleep without Bun-Bun as Rita tries to use a backup Bun-Bun. When that fails, Clyde tries to help Lincoln find another plush animal which doesn't go well as they try to find the plush unicorn. Meanwhile, Luna finds a guitar from behind The Burnt Bean and works to return it to its elderly owner Buddy Purkens who doesn't want it back. At the same time, Luan gets her learner's permit as Lynn Sr. wants to teach her so that he can prove to Rita that he's the best driver's instructor where Lynn Sr. had trained Leni and Rita had trained Lori and Luna as they also encounter Buddy Purkens. Guest stars: August Michael Peterson as Lily Loud, Sanjana Rajagopalan as Zia, Larry McCray as Buddy Purkens, Austin Boyce as Tina
32	12	"Little Sisters' Big Adventure"	Jonathan Judge	Peter Limm	June 18, 2024	212	N/A
Lori, Leni, Luna, and Luan head out to have lunch at the Royal Woods Mall. They don't want to bring Lucy, Lana, Lola, and Lisa to come along as it is a big sister trip. Displeased that they can't go with them for their movie night, Lucy, Lana, Lola, and Lisa stow away in Vanzilla when they plan to see a movie called The Rise of Blood River: Hookhand Returns at the Royal Woods Drive-In theater. Upon arrival, Lucy, Lana, Lola, and Lisa engage at the activities while contending with frat brothers Brody, Cody, and Lump from Penta Chi and avoiding the drive-in's security guard Butch. Meanwhile, Lynn Sr. and Rita find their date night affected by Lincoln and Clyde working on a masterpiece for the Royal Woods BRICKCO Competition. Guest stars: Lexi DiBenedetto as Lori Loud, Charlie Hobert as Butch, Isaiah Nicholas Piece as Brody, Matthew Read as Cody, Matthew D. Torkilsen as Lump
33	13	"The Boyfriend Stays in the Picture"	Jonathan Judge	Tim Hobert	June 19, 2024	214	N/A
Lincoln and Clyde are working on the final scene of their movie Robot Wars 2 that will be shown to an investor named Prescott Moneygreen. They enlisted Bobby to be in their film. Things get worse when Lori and Bobby have an argument over the tight pants she bought him that led to them breaking up. With Lori forbidding anyone from seeing or speaking to Bobby, Lincoln and Clyde work to find a way to get Lori and Bobby back together and finish Robot Wars 2 before the deadline that Prescott Moneygreen gave them. Meanwhile, Lana and Lola try to come up with ways to get Lynn Sr. to raise their bedtime. At the same time, Lynn Sr. and Rita get into an argument regarding Lori and Bobby breaking up and Rita buying too many bananas. Guest stars: Lexi DiBenedetto as Lori Loud, Damian Alonso as Bobby, Zach Zagoria as Patrick, John O'Hurley as Prescott Moneygreen
34	14	"The Man with the Backup Plan"	Daniella Eisman	Alan Yanaga	September 18, 2024	215	N/A
Lynn attends an event at Royal Woods Middle School where professional soccer player Alexa Jordan is speaking. She states that 1 in 2,000,000 will make it to becoming a soccer player and suggests that everyone who doesn't make it to have a backup plan. Moved by Alexa's speech, Lynn plans to have a backup plan. Lincoln gets the idea to help his sisters with a backup plan where he has Lisa work at an entry position at Royal Woods Technology, Lynn work as a neighborhood watch member, Luan work as a bus attendant, and Luna work as a wedding singer. This gives Clyde a problem when he gets a first date with a girl named Angie causing him to take advice from Lana and Lola. While Lisa becomes successful, Lynn, Luna, and Luan do their jobs which goes comically awry as while Clyde struggles to impress Angie. Meanwhile, Lynn Sr. undergoes stress management by pairing up with Lucy after seeing her calm and goes through different stages of staying calm which ends up causing Rita to do all the chores. Guest stars: August Michael Peterson as Lily, Kara Royster as Alexa Jordan, Kylee Brown as Angie, Gabriel Burrafato as Greg
35	15	"The Odyssey"	Daniella Eisman	Tim Hobert and Alan Yanaga	September 25, 2024	216	N/A
As Lynn Sr. and Rita get organized for Lisa's science competition in this prequel to "The Man with the Backup Plan", Lincoln tells them that Clyde's family is moving to Florida upon Howard being promoted by Dynacorp's CEO Mr. Worthington and is sitting Lisa's science competition out. They plan to do everything before Clyde's family moves away. One of the things that Clyde wants to do is go to Mac's and get a milkshake like they did when they first became friends. Though they do things beforehand like helping an old lady move in and get her dog Rumsfield who ran off, encountering their old fort, running afoul of the Death on Wheels biker gang led by Buford, and hiding out at Dynacorp. Though Clyde has a real reason for going to Mac's that involves a girl named Angie that works there. Guest stars: Stephen Guarino as Howard McBride, Eric Allan Kramer as Buford, Kylee Brown as Angie, Ellen Karsten as Elderly Woman
36	16	"A Tale of Three Parties"	Jonathan Judge	Tim Hobert and Michael Hobert	October 2, 2024	217	N/A
Three different parties are occurring at the Loud House all at once per the decision of Lynn Sr. and Rita when this was brought up with them. Lincoln and Clyde host a winner take all candy game called "Candy Slam" with Liam, Rusty, Zach, and some people from their school. Lori, Leni, and Bobby host a Timothée Chalamet-themed masquerade party with their parents and other people to commemorate the release of his movie Midnight Masquerade (which stars Chalamet and Sophie Etienne) where the last person unmasked wins the contest as a mysterious participant shows up. Lucy and her Morticians Club host a Blood Moon Festival. When the Morticians Club find themselves drawn to the candy game like Dante becoming Lincoln's partner when Lincoln's original accident-prone partner Hudson Frickley gets injured, Lucy fears that her friends will split up and starts targeting Lincoln's friends one by one. Guest stars: Lexi DiBenedetto as Lori Loud, Damian Alonso as Bobby, Nolan Maddox as Rusty Spokes, Mateo Castel as Zach Gurdle, Gavin Maddox Bergman as Liam Hunnicut, Anthony Joo as Hudson, Joshua Gallup as Boris, Max Malas as Dante, Hannah Alltmont as Haiku
37	17	"Game Night"	Jonathan Judge	Tyler Mar and Derek Isa	October 9, 2024	218	N/A
Now that Lincoln and Clyde both have girlfriends, they plan to take Zia and Angie out on a double date to the classiest restaurant in Royal Woods known as the Singing Scallop followed by Lynn Sr. taking them to the botanical gardens. Unfortunately, today happens to be the third Saturday of the month which is when the Loud family has their game night as Lincoln and Clyde are the undisputed kings of game night and that Lynn has never won. As none of the family members want to reschedule, Lincoln and Clyde try to convince Zia and Angie that they aren't going to the botanical gardens until later which leads to a misunderstanding that causes Zia and Angie to be their partners at Loud Family Game Night where they don't know much about them. Guest stars: Sanjana Rajagopalan as Zia, Kylee Brown as Angie
38	18	"Epic Tales of Epic Fails: The Madman with the Plan"	Julian Petrillo	David McHugh and Matt Flanagan	October 16, 2024	219	N/A
Lincoln and Clyde work on pulling off a bicycle ramp stunt as their friend Hudson comes along to see their stunt. After encountering Hudson's mother Karen who was responsible for the crayon ban and the upcoming plans to demolish the playground where Hudson got motion sickness, Lynn Sr. and Rita come across the bicycle ramp as they either tell Lincoln and Clyde to either send Hudson home or to take down the bicycle ramp before something bad happens and before they return from the hardware store to get something to sand the floors. Hudson rides off the bicycle ramp to impress Luna and breaks his arm causing Lincoln, Clyde, Leni, Luna, Lucy, Lana, and Lola to cover the incident before their parents and/or Karen finds out. Meanwhile, Luan has established a fails and epic fails website as Lynn tries to pull one off with Lana and Lola recording it. To prove that science can out-funny comedy, Lisa downloads five decades of stand-up specials onto Todd's hard drive causing Luan to end up in a war with Lisa which goes horribly awry for Todd. Guest stars: Jessica Pohly as Karen, Anthony Joo as Hudson
39	19	"A Really Loud Thanksgiving; The Gobble Squabble Debacle"	Julian Petrillo	David S. Rosenthal	November 26, 2024	220	N/A
On Thanksgiving, Lincoln and Clyde plan to get on the local Thanksgiving news story run by lead anchorman Chip Winters (who continues to consider Lincoln and Clyde to not be newsworthy enough) after being dropped from Liam's news story due to them not having the "it factor". Lana tries to get her family to sign a petition to not have turkey. Lynn Sr. and Rita work on preparing Thanksgiving dinner with help from Lily as Luna, Luan, and Lucy don't want to help as they would "betray" Lily. While helping Lisa work on making the Expando-Pants for Black Friday, Leni learns that a boy she met at the mall named Patrick back in "The Boyfriend Stays in the Picture" never celebrated Thanksgiving and she invites him over as Lori remembers him. As Lori and Lynn work on the Turkey Bowl Draft, Lola breaks the news that she been made Little Miss Giblets where she will pardon a turkey as Lincoln, Clyde, and Lisa plan to take advantage of it. She learns from Lana that Little Miss Giblets is the face of GibCo which is the largest distributor of turkey and turkey killer in the Midwestern United States. Upon seeing that Lana was right upon going and finding out that GibCo's leader Franklin Whitecollar will have the pardoned turkey Mr. Gobblesworth sent to the slaughterhouse, Lola learns that it was all a sham and enlists Luan, Lucy, Lana, Lisa, and Lynn Sr. to help save Mr. Gobblesworth leading to a stand-off at the Loud House. Guest stars: Lexi DiBenedetto as Lori Loud, Zach Zogoria as Patrick, Kevin Farley as Franklin Whitecollar, August Michael Peterson as Lily Loud, Brian Schaeffer as Chip Winters

== Films ==
Title	Directed by	Written by	Original release date	U.S. viewers (millions)
"A Loud House Christmas"	Jonathan Judge	Liz Maccie	November 26, 2021	0.88
The Loud family is preparing for Christmas as Lincoln mentions that Christmas can get pretty hectic in the Loud House. Everyone gathers in the kitchen for breakfast except for Lori who is away at Fairway University. Lori mentions on the video chat that it would be too much to come join them. Lincoln disagrees as Christmas is about being together. Everyone else mentions that they have something else to do: Luna is going skiing with Sam, Luan has a gig at Sunset Canyon Retirement Home, and Lynn Sr. and Rita plan to take everyone else to Miami Beach, Florida. He gets a package that turns out to be a 13-person toboggan to use on Tall Timbers Hill and opens it in front of his family only to find that it broke during the delivery.
"A Really Haunted Loud House"	Jonathan Judge	Teleplay by : Tony Gama-Lobo & Rebecca May and Tim Hobert; Story by : Tony Gama-Lobo & Rebecca May	September 28, 2023	0.13
On Halloween, the Loud family is planning their annual Halloween Spooktakular. A complication arrives when Lincoln and Clyde want to attend a Halloween party held by Xander Coddington (Martín Fajardo), the cool new kid at Royal Woods Middle School and a social media influencer. Due to a series of events at home, Lincoln and Clyde are left to take action to save the Loud family's Halloween.

== Reception ==
Stephanie Snyder from Common Sense Media gave the series three-out-of-five stars, saying that "the live-action show is sure to capture the hearts of young viewers who already loved The Loud House as they see the characters come to life."

=== Ratings ===
Viewership and ratings per season of The Really Loud House
Season	Episodes	First aired		Last aired		Avg. viewers (millions)
Season	Episodes	Date	Viewers (millions)	Date	Viewers (millions)	Avg. viewers (millions)
1	20	November 3, 2022	0.22	June 29, 2023	0.12	0.17
2	19	February 19, 2024	0.13	November 26, 2024	TBD	0.10

=== Awards and nominations ===
Year	Award	Category	Nominee(s)	Result	Ref.
2023	Make-Up Artists and Hair Stylists Guild Awards	Children and Teen Programming - Best Make-Up	Sierra Barton, Alisha Baijounas	Nominated	
2023	Kids' Choice Awards	Favorite Kids TV Show	The Really Loud House	Nominated	
2023	Kids' Choice Awards	Favorite Male TV Star - Kids	Wolfgang Schaeffer	Nominated	
2023	Children's and Family Emmy Awards	Stunt Coordination for a Live Action Program	Dorenda Moore	Nominated	
2024	Kids' Choice Awards	Favorite Kids' TV Show	The Really Loud House	Nominated	
2024	Kids' Choice Awards	Favorite Male TV Star - Kids	Jahzir Bruno	Nominated	
2024	Kids' Choice Awards	Favorite Male TV Star - Kids	Wolfgang Schaeffer	Nominated	
2024	3rd Children's and Family Emmy Awards	Hairstyling and Makeup	Shelly D'Apolito, Jennifer McDaniel, Elicia Vazquez, Alisha L. Baijounas, Reneé Majour, Abril Velez, Charles Yusko, Siobhan Carmody, Alison Smith, Drew Burrell, Sierra Barton, Michael Solano, Aleka Kastelic, Sheila Trujillo, Lauren Weinstein, Joe Rivera (Emmy)	Nominated	
2024	3rd Children's and Family Emmy Awards	Hairstyling and Makeup	Sierra Barton, Sheila Trujillo, Charles Yusko (Children's and Family Emmy Award)	Nominated	
2024	3rd Children's and Family Emmy Awards	Stunt Coordination for a Live Action Program	The Really Loud House	Nominated	
2024	Hollywood Music in Media Awards	Best Song - Onscreen Performance (TV)	Clyde with the Loud Sisters - "Clincoln McCloud"	Nominated	
2025	Kidscreen Awards	Best Live-Action Series - Kids	The Really Loud House	Won	
2025	Make-Up Artists & Hair Stylists Guild Awards	Best Makeup - Children and Teen Television Programming	Michael Solano, Lauren Weinstein, Jennifer McDaniel, Sierra Barton, Sheila Trujillo	Nominated	
2025	Make-Up Artists & Hair Stylists Guild Awards	Best Hair Styling - Children and Teen Television Programming	Charles Yusko, Alison Smith, Drew Burrell, Shelly D'Apolito, Elicia Vazquez	Nominated	
2025	GLAAD Media Awards	Outstanding Kids & Family Programming or Film - Live Action	"Louds in Love"	Nominated	
2025	Young Artist Awards	Best Performance in a TV Series - Recurring Youth Artist	Levi Mynatt	Nominated	
2025	Kids' Choice Awards	Favorite Kids TV Show	The Really Loud House	Nominated	

== Home media ==
Region	Set title	Season(s)	Aspect ratio	Episode count	Time length	Release date
1	Season One	1	16:9	20	453 minutes	February 27, 2024
