= List of Bubble Guppies episodes =

Bubble Guppies is a preschool children's television series produced for Nickelodeon and created by Jonny Belt, and Robert Scull. On June 4, 2019, the show was revived for a fifth season, which debuted on September 27, 2019. On February 19, 2020, the show was renewed for a sixth season, which premiered on October 19, 2021.

== Series overview ==
Season	Episodes	Originally released	
Season	Episodes	First released	Last released
1	20	January 24, 2011	October 24, 2011
2	19	November 4, 2011	May 1, 2013
3	24	August 12, 2013	May 19, 2015
4	14	May 21, 2015	October 21, 2016
5	18	September 27, 2019	March 5, 2021
6	34	October 19, 2021	June 30, 2023

== Episodes ==
=== Season 1 (2011) ===
No. overall	No. in season	Title	Directed by	Written by	Storyboard by	Original release date	Prod. code
1	1	"Call a Clambulance!"	Claus Dzalakowski	Jonny Belt and Robert Scull	Robert Bandel, Otis Brayboy and Thomas Connor	January 24, 2011	106
Oona's friend Avi breaks a bone in his tail after being involved in a tricycle accident and is sent to a hospital via a "clambulance". Mr. Grouper also talks about bones and what doctors do like listening to hearts and getting injections.: Pop Song: A Bunch of Bone + Reprise; Shop: Hospital; Lunch Joke: Hambulance on Rye (Gil); Dance Song: Doctor Dance; Storybook: Jungle Doctors; Field Trip: Hospital
2	2	"The Crayon Prix!"	Claus Dzalakowski	Jonny Belt, Robert Scull and Rodney Stringfellow	Robert Bandel	January 25, 2011	116
The Bubble Guppies race in different colored cars as a lesson on colors.: Pop Song: A Color Just Right; Shop: Helmet Paint; Lunch Joke: Crayonberry Juice (Deema); Dance Song: Color Dance; Storybook: Color Workers; Field Trip: Crayon Prix
3	3	"Bubble Puppy!"	Claus Dzalakowski	Jonny Belt, Robert Scull and Adam Peltzman	Robert Bandel and Thomas Connor	January 26, 2011	108
Gil sees a bunch of dogs at a dog shelter and wants to adopt one. Mr. Grouper teaches him and the group about dog care.: Pop Song: I Want a Pet to Love; Shop: Pet Shop; Lunch Joke: Hot Dog (Goby); Dance Song: Pet Dance; Storybook: The Emperor and the Dragon Puppy; Field Trip: Pet Adoption Center; Note: This episode features the debut of Bubble Puppy, Gil's pet dog.
4	4	"Build Me a Building!"	Claus Dzalakowski	Jonny Belt, Robert Scull and Adam Peltzman	Robert Bandel and Otis Brayboy	January 27, 2011	103
The Bubble Guppies build a doghouse for Bubble Puppy with the right materials.: Shop: DIY Hardware Store (2); Dance Song: Building Dance (4); Lunch Joke: Hammer and Cheese Sandwich (Goby) (3); Pop Song: Build Me a Building (1); Storybook: Royal Builders (5); Field Trip: Builder Site Outside (6); Note: This episode has a different order than the other Season 1 episodes. Numbers in parentheses indicate the order.
5	5	"Ducks in a Row!" "Instruments!"	Claus Dzalakowski	Jonny Belt, Robert Scull and Jeff Borkin	Robert Bandel	January 31, 2011	117
The Bubble Guppies watch a marching band, but a duck interrupts it, so Nonny ends up leading it.: Pop Song: The Band Plays On; Shop: Marching Band Mart; Lunch Joke: Tuba Fish Sandwich (Nonny); Dance Song: Band Dance; Storybook: Cowhand Marching Band; Field Trip: Marching Band
6	6	"The Grumpfish Special!"	Claus Dzalakowski	Jonny Belt, Robert Scull and Adam Peltzman	Robert Bandel and Otis Brayboy	February 1, 2011	104
The Bubble Guppies deal with Mr. Grumpfish, a difficult and short-tempered customer, at their restaurant.: Pop Song: Restaurant; Shop: Fruit Restaurant; Lunch Joke: Three Chicken Surprise (Goby); Dance Song: Restaurant Dance; Storybook: Super Restaurant Chef; Field Trip: Pizzeria; Short Song: Grumpy Fish
7	7	"The Moon Rocks!"	Claus Dzalakowski	Jonny Belt, Robert Scull and Janice Burgess	Robert Bandel	February 2, 2011	118
The Bubble Guppies watch a planetarium show. The class also learn about planets.: Pop Song: Sun, Beautiful Sun + 2 Reprises; Shop: Moon Pizzeria; Lunch Joke: Ice Cream Sun-dae (Deema); Dance Song: Space Dance; Storybook: Space Alien Chase; Field Trip: Planetarium
8	8	"Who's Gonna Play the Big Bad Wolf?"	Claus Dzalakowski	Jonny Belt, Robert Scull and Adam Peltzman	Robert Bandel and Thomas Connor	February 3, 2011	112
Deema fills in for an actor who catches a cold when rehearsing for the big bad wolf for the play, "The Three Little Pigs" on stage.: Pop Song: Our Great Play; Shop: Actor Store; Lunch Joke: Three Little Figs (Deema); Dance Song: Actor Dance; Storybook: Caveman Actors; Field Trip: Stage
9	9	"We Totally Rock!"	Claus Dzalakowski	Jonny Belt and Robert Scull	Robert Bandel and Otis Brayboy	February 28, 2011	105
After Goby and Gil watch a rock band perform, the Bubble Guppies start their own band.: Pop Song: I Need to Rock!; Shop: Music Store; Lunch Joke: Microphonie and Cheese (Goby); Dance Song: Music Dance; Storybook: Scotland Concert; Field Trip: Rock and Roll Concert; Short Song: We Totally Rock
10	10	"Fishketball!"	Claus Dzalakowski	Jonny Belt, Robert Scull and Adam Peltzman	Robert Bandel and Otis Brayboy	March 1, 2011	102
The Bubble Guppies practice bouncing, throwing, catching, and playing together as a team to prepare for a game of fishketball.: Pop Song: Choose the Right Ball; Shop: Ball Bazaar; Lunch Joke: Spaghetti and Baseballs (Nonny); Dance Song: Ball Dance; Storybook: Pirate Ball; Field Trip: Fishketball Game
11	11	"The Legend of Pinkfoot"	Claus Dzalakowski	Jonny Belt, Robert Scull and Janice Burgess	Robert Bandel, Otis Brayboy and Thomas Connor	March 2, 2011	107
Goby tells the Bubble Guppies a spooky campfire story about Pinkfoot.: Pop Song: Camping Out, Camping Outside; Shop: Camping Outdoor; Lunch Joke: Sleeping Bag of Chips (Nonny); Dance Song: Camping Dance; Storybook: Camping in Space; Field Trip: Campsite; Short Song: Gracias
12	12	"Gup, Gup and Away!"	Claus Dzalakowski	Jonny Belt, Robert Scull and Carin Greenberg	Robert Bandel	March 3, 2011	119
The Bubble Guppies learn about taking off in an airplane.: Pop Song: We’re Gonna Fly + Reprise; Shop: Airport; Lunch Joke: Plane Bagel (Nonny); Dance Song: Airplane Dance; Storybook: Flight to the Treasure Island; Field Trip: Airport
13	13	"The Spring Chicken is Coming!"	Claus Dzalakowski	Jonny Belt, Robert Scull and Rodney Stringfellow	Robert Bandel	April 15, 2011	113
In order for spring to officially arrive, the Bubble Guppies must grow a flower for the Spring Chicken.: Pop Song: It's a Beautiful Day; Shop: Mother Nature Art Gallery; Lunch Joke: Spring Roll (Goby); Dance Song: Spring Dance; Storybook: Happy Bug; Field Trip: Spring Festival
14	14	"Boy Meets Squirrel!"	Claus Dzalakowski	Jonny Belt, Robert Scull and Anna Housley Juster	Robert Bandel	April 22, 2011	120
The Bubble Guppies learn about trees when Nonny befriends a squirrel.: Pop Song: Mr. Tree; Shop: Tree Outside; Lunch Joke: Macaroni and Trees (Nonny); Dance Song: Recycle Dance; Storybook: Tree People; Field Trip: Forest Park
15	15	"Have a Cow!"	Claus Dzalakowski	Jonny Belt, Robert Scull and Jeff Borkin	Robert Bandel and Thomas Connor	May 6, 2011	111
Molly and her friends go to the farm to watch a cow named Butterscotch give birth to a calf. Mr Grouper and the class learn about other animals like pigs and roosters.: Pop Song: The Farmer Song; Shop: Animal Call; Lunch Joke: Cheese and Tractors (Nonny); Dance Song: Farm Dance; Storybook: Farmer Carrot; Field Trip: Farm
16	16	"Super Shrimptennial Celebration!"	Claus Dzalakowski	Jonny Belt, Robert Scull and Rodney Stringfellow	Robert Bandel and Thomas Connor	September 19, 2011	110
It is the Shrimptennial Celebration in the Big Bubble City and the Bubble Guppies visit.: Pop Song: Big Bubble City; Shop: Bakery; Lunch Joke: Horn on the Cob (Oona); Dance Song: City Dance; Storybook: The Temple of the Golden Pretzel; Field Trip: Big Bubble City; Short Song: Super Shrimptennial Celebration
17	17	"Happy Clam Day!"	Claus Dzalakowski	Jonny Belt and Robert Scull	Robert Bandel	September 20, 2011	101
When Molly and Gil find Clam in a box mailing himself to his cousin Sam for a Clam Day party, the Guppies have to learn about the mail so they can help Clam send an invitation to Sam.: Pop Song: Mail, Mail, Sent Me a Letter; Shop: Post Office; Lunch Joke: Stampwich (Nonny); Dance Song: Mail Dance; Storybook: Zip Mail Galaxy; Field Trip: Clam Party; Short Song: We Love You Clam; Guest Star: Tom Kenny as Sam the Clam
18	18	"Can You Dig It?"	Claus Dzalakowski	Jonny Belt, Robert Scull and Jeff Borkin	Robert Bandel and Thomas Connor	September 21, 2011	109
Nonny uncovers a Triceratops fossil at an archaeological dig just by sneezing due to his allergy to dirt.: Pop Song: A Long Time Ago; Shop: Dinosaur Drive; Lunch Joke: Bananasaurus (Nonny); Dance Song: Dinosaur Dance; Storybook: Triceracops; Field Trip: Dinosaur Site; Short Song: He Found It
19	19	"Bubble Bites!"	Claus Dzalakowski	Jonny Belt, Robert Scull and Carin Greenberg	Robert Bandel	September 22, 2011	114
The Bubble Guppies go to the supermarket and race another shopper to get a dog food called "Bubble Bites" for Bubble Puppy.: Pop Song: Super, Super, Supermarket; Shop: Shopping; Short Song: Deema's Produce Party + Reprise; Lunch Joke: Can of Jumping Beans (Nonny); Dance Song: Shopping Dance; Storybook: Islander Sandwich; Field Trip: Shopping
20	20	"Haunted House Party!"	Claus Dzalakowski	Jonny Belt, Robert Scull and Jeff Borkin	Robert Bandel	October 24, 2011	115
The Bubble Guppies celebrate Halloween by having a haunted party at the haunted house, but Gil fears that a ghost will scare them.: Pop Song: Spooky; Shop: Pet Potion; Lunch Joke: Sandwitch (Nonny); Dance Song: Spooky Dance; Storybook: Spooky Shadow; Field Trip: Haunted House

=== Season 2 (2011–2013) ===
No. overall	No. in season	Title	Directed by	Written by	Storyboard by	Original release date	Prod. code	U.S. viewers (millions)
21	1	"X Marks the Spot!"	Jeff Astolfo	Robert Scull and Clark Stubbs	Natalie Long	November 4, 2011	201	N/A
The Bubble Guppies help a pirate find buried treasure.: Pop Song: X Marks the Spot + Reprise; Shop: Pirate Shop; Lunch Joke: Maparoni and Cheese (Nonny); Storybook: Pirate Road Trip; Dance Song: Pirate Dance + Reprise; Field Trip: Treasure Hunt
22	2	"Happy Holidays, Mr. Grumpfish!"	Jeff Astolfo	Adam Peltzman and Robert Scull	Lyndon Ruddy	December 9, 2011	202	1.4
In this parody of Christmas specials, the Bubble Guppies assume different careers and teach Mr. Grumpfish about the true meaning of the holidays.: Pop Song: Tonight Is a Holiday + 2 Reprises; Shop: Holiday Bake Shop; Lunch Joke: Spaghetti and Snowballs (Nonny); Storybook: Marshmallow Patrol; Short Song: Join Hands
23	3	"The Lonely Rhino!"	Jeff Astolfo	Robert Scull and Clark Stubbs	James Caswell	February 10, 2012	203	1.73
The Bubble Guppies help find Monty the rhinocerus a friend at the zoo.: Pop Song: At the Zoo; Shop : Animal Hotel; Lunch Joke : Macarhino and Cheese (Nonny); Storybook: Animal Post Deliver; Dance Song: Animal Dance; Field Trip: Zoo
24	4	"Bubble Puppy's Fin-tastic Fairy Tale!"	Jeff Astolfo	Clark Stubbs	Gordon Crum	February 19, 2012	204−205 (999)	2.56
The guppies must stop the witch (Wanda Sykes) after she uses a magic potion to turn Bubble Puppy into a frog.: Pop Song : Once Upon a Time; Short Song: She So Mean, Launch Time; Guest Star: Wanda Sykes as the Witch
25	5	"The Cowgirl Parade!"	Jeff Astolfo	Robert Scull and Clark Stubbs	Lyndon Ruddy	March 9, 2012	207	N/A
Molly wants to be a cowgirl like her idol, Dusty.: Pop Song: I Wanna Be a Cowgirl/Cowboy; Shop: Opposite Saloon; Lunch Joke: Lassoroni and Cheese (Nonny); Storybook: Cowboy Opposite; Dance Song: Cowboy and Cowgirl Dance; Field Trip: Old Wild West Parade
26	6	"Firefighter Gil to the Rescue!"	Jeff Astolfo	Clark Stubbs	James Caswell	March 23, 2012	206	1.7
After being rescued by the firefighters, Gil rescues the Fire Department after their fire dog gets stuck in a tree while chasing a squirrel.: Pop Song: Look for the Fire Truck; Shop: Firefighter Game; Lunch Joke: Hamburger and Emergencheese (Nonny); Storybook: Firefighter Knights to the Rescue; Dance Song: Firefighter Dance; Field Trip: Firefighter Breaking News
27	7	"A Tooth on the Looth!"	Jeff Astolfo	Bob Mittenthal, Mike Rubiner, Robert Scull and Clark Stubbs	Lyndon Ruddy	May 4, 2012	209	1.58
Deema is excited for the Tooth Fairy to come so she can get a reward for her loose tooth.: Pop Song: Just Smile; Shop: Dentist; Lunch Joke: Macaroni and Teeth (Nonny); Storybook: Swamp Dentist; Dance Song: Dentist Dance; Field Trip: Dentist; Short Song: Here She Is
28	8	"Humunga-Truck!"	Jeff Astolfo	Clark Stubbs	Trevor Hierons	May 15, 2012	208	N/A
The guppies are invited to go see a truck show.: Pop Song: Truck Are Tough + Reprise; Shop: Loading Dock; Lunch Joke: Truckaroni and Cheese (Nonny); Storybook: Truck Delivery; Dance Song: Truck Dance; Field Trip: Truck Stadium
29	9	"Check It Out!"	Jeff Astolfo	Jonny Belt, Tracey Keevan and Robert Scull	Natalie Long	September 7, 2012	219	N/A
Gil gets magically transported inside his favorite books in an attempt to find his library card.: Pop Song: Check It Out; Shop: Library; Lunch Joke: Liberry Juice (Nonny); Storybook: Brave Sail Library; Dance Song: Book Dance; Field Trip: Library; Guest Star: Edward Hibbert as Agent 3
30	10	"The Beach Ball!"	Jeff Astolfo	Robert Scull and Clark Stubbs	Natalie Long	September 17, 2012	210	1.4
Molly hopes to become beach queen at the Beach Ball, but so does her friend Sandy (Nika Futterman).: Pop Song: On the Beach; Shop: Beach; Lunch Joke: Spaghetti and Beach Balls (Nonny); Storybook: Arctic Surfer; Dance Song: Beach Dance; Field Trip: Beach; Short Song: Coconut Water + Reprise; Note: The episode is based on Cinderella.
31	11	"The Sizzling Scampinis!"	Jeff Astolfo	Robert Scull and Clark Stubbs	Jeff Amey	September 18, 2012	211	N/A
The Guppies are invited to go to a circus to perform.: Pop Song: Circus, Circus; Shop: Circus Carnival; Lunch Joke: Duck Pie (Nonny); Storybook: Clown Camping; Dance Song: Circus Dance; Field Trip: Circus
32	12	"Construction Psyched!"	Jeff Astolfo	Clark Stubbs	Natalie Long	September 19, 2012	212	N/A
Goby must retrace his steps to find his lost toy dump truck at a construction site.: Pop Song: Is There a Job I Can Do for You; Shop: Construction Training; Lunch Joke: Craneberry Juice (Nonny); Storybook Dino Construction; Dance Song: Construction Dance; Field Trip: Construction Site
33	13	"Bubble-Cadabra!"	Jeff Astolfo	Bob Mittenthal, Mike Rubiner, Robert Scull and Clark Stubbs	Jeff Amey	September 20, 2012	214	1.4
Molly and Gil become magicians to make an elephant disappear after Gil makes a magician disappear.: Pop Song: Abracadabra; Shop: Magic Store; Lunch Joke: Magicroni and Cheese (Nonny); Storybook: Royal Magic; Dance Song: Magic Dance; Field Trip: Magic Show
34	14	"Bubble Duckies!"	Jeff Astolfo	Jonny Belt, Robert Scull and Clark Stubbs	Natalie Long	January 22, 2013	217	N/A
Molly and Gil help a duckling named Beep and his family navigate themselves through a storm cloud.: Pop Song: And I Would Fly; Shop: Bird Quiz Show; Lunch Joke: Onion Wings (Nonny); Storybook: Bird Egg Delivery; Dance Song: Bird Dance; Field Trip: Bubbletucky Air Flight Show
35	15	"Triple Track Train Race!"	Jeff Astolfo	Robert Scull	Jeff Amey	January 24, 2013	218	1.6
Ol' Number 9 is competing in a triple track train race.: Pop Song: Take Me Away on a Train; Shop: Train Station; Lunch Joke: Trackaroni and Cheese (Nonny); Storybook: Train Engineer Llama; Dance Song: Train Dance; Field Trip: Train Race
36	16	"Only the Sphinx Nose!"	Jeff Astolfo	Jonny Belt, Robert Scull, Rodney Stringfellow and Clark Stubbs	Natalie Long	March 11, 2013	215	1.4
The Bubble Guppies find out how the Sphinx lost its nose.: Pop Song: Nobody Nose; Shop: Desert Market; Lunch Joke: Pearamid (Nonny); Short Song: Hieroglyphics Are Terrific; Storybook: Egypt Cruise; Dance Song: Egypt Dance; Field Trip: Museum
37	17	"Sir Nonny the Nice!"	Jeff Astolfo	Robert Scull and Clark Stubbs	Natalie Long	March 13, 2013	213	1.6
Nonny wants to become a knight. However, he has to face Sir Mulligan the Awesome on his first challenge, miniature golf.: Pop Song: Brave Brave Knight; Shop: Knight Arcade; Lunch Joke: Fruit of Armor (Nonny); Storybook: Weather Knight; Dance Song: Knight Dance; Field Trip: Castle
38	18	"Bring on the Bugs!"	Jeff Astolfo	Bob Mittenthal, Mike Rubiner, Robert Scull and Clark Stubbs	Jeff Amey	April 29, 2013	216	N/A
The Bubble Guppies get to march in a big bug parade.: Pop Song: I'm Buggin Out; Shop: Bug Balloon; Lunch Joke: Apple Spider (Nonny); Storybook: Ant Fruit Tunnel; Dance Song: Bug Dance; Field Trip: Bug Parade
39	19	"Good Hair Day!"	Jeff Astolfo	Clark Stubbs	Natalie Long	May 1, 2013	220	N/A
It's picture day, and Gil needs to get a haircut after his hair grows really long.: Pop Song: I Love My Hair; Shop: Hair Wig; Lunch Joke: Ice Cream Comb (Nonny); Storybook: Super Hair-oes; Dance Song: Hair Dance; Field Trip: Beauty Hair Salon; Short Song: Haircut; Guest Star: Marissa Jaret Winokur As Ms. Jenny

=== Season 3 (2013–2015) ===
No. overall	No. in season	Title	Directed by	Written by	Storyboard by	Original release date	Prod. code
40	1	"Get Ready for School!"	Jeff Astolfo	Jonny Belt and Robert Scull	John Leard, Tillie Sain and Mykl Sivak	August 12, 2013	304
Oona's friend Avi is worried about starting school for the first time. The Bubble Guppies demonstrate how much fun school can be to mollify Avi.: Pop Song: Get Ready for School + Reprise; Shop: Back to School Store; Lunch Joke: Backpackaroni and Cheese (Nonny); Storybook: Space School; Dance Song: School Dance; Field Trip: Avi's Preschool; Guest Star: Nancy Cartwright as Ms. Michelle
41	2	"The Police Cop-etition!"	Jeff Astolfo	Tim McKeon and Robert Scull	Tillie Sain	September 6, 2013	305
Officer Miranda (Wendie Malick) teaches Gil and the other kids how to be police officers and use laws to keep people safe.: Pop Song: Cop Cop; Shop: Zebra Crossing Road; Lunch Joke: Badgeroni Pizza (Nonny); Storybook: Triceracops 2: Speed Dinosaur Dimension; Dance Song: Police Dance; Field Trip: Police Station; Guest Star: Wendie Malick as Officer Miranda; Note: In June 2020, this episode was pulled from television broadcast and online streaming during the nationwide protests following the murder of George Floyd by an on-duty police officer. The episode was eventually reinstated in July 2025.
42	3	"The Elephant Trunk-a-Dunk!"	Jeff Astolfo	Robert Scull and Ed Valentine	Tillie Sain and Mykl Sivak	September 23, 2013	306
The Bubble Guppies watch elephants playing basketball.: Pop Song: Elephant; Shop: Snuggle Soft; Lunch Joke: Elephant Souprise (Nonny); Storybook: Elephant Mission World; Dance Song: Elephant Dance; Field Trip: Elephant Stadium
43	4	"The Super Ballet Bowl!"	Jeff Astolfo	Tim McKeon and Robert Scull	Tillie Sain and Mykl Sivak	September 25, 2013	307
Molly wants to be a ballerina, and the Bubble Guppies perform in a ballet tournament.: Pop Song: Ballet Ballet Tonight; Shop: Ballet Music; Lunch Joke: Tutuna Fish Sandwich (Nonny); Storybook: Ballet Ninjas; Dance Song: Ballet Dance; Field Trip: Super Ballet Show
44	5	"The Wizard of Oz-tralia!"	Jeff Astolfo	Robert Scull	Tillie Sain and Mykl Sivak	October 15, 2013	308
The Bubble Guppies star in a parody of The Wizard of Oz relating to Australia.: Pop Song: Australia + Reprise; Shop: Billabong Lake; Lunch Joke: Kangaroni and Cheese (Nonny); Short Song: DINGO (Parody of Bingo); Storybook: Australian Pizza Delivery; Dance Song: Australia Dance; Field Trip: Sydney Opera House
45	6	"The Arctic Life!"	Jeff Astolfo	Robert Scull	Tillie Sain and Mykl Sivak	October 17, 2013	309
Gil navigates across the Arctic and the other Guppies learn about Arctic animals along the way.: Pop Song: The Arctic Life + Reprise; Shop: Arctics Favorite Animal; Lunch Joke: Chicken Soup with Ice (Nonny); Storybook: Arctic Rangers; Dance Song: Arctic Dance; Field Trip: Arctic
46	7	"Puppy Love!"	Jeff Astolfo	Ross Alvord, Jonny Belt, Lucas Mills and Robert Scull	Natalie Long, John Leard, Tillie Sain and Mykl Sivak	November 8, 2013	310
Bubble Puppy is sick. The Bubble Guppies head to the veterinarian in hopes that he will get better.: Pop Song: A Puppy Is a Guppy's Best Friend + Reprise; Shop: Puppies Take Care; Lunch Joke: Chicken Poodle Soup (Nonny); Storybook: Puppy Veterinarian; Dance Song: Dog Dance; Field Trip: Animal Hospital
47	8	"The Puppy and the Ring"	Jeff Astolfo	Jonny Belt and Robert Scull	Tillie Sain and Mykl Sivak	December 5, 2013	998
The guppies must save Bubbledom from the Night Wizard (Jeffrey Tambor) in order not to make it nighttime forever.: Pop Song: Night Night, Flutter Guppies, Snow Guppies, Under Guppies, Brand New Day; Guest Star: Jeffrey Tambor as the Night Wizard; Note: This episode has almost no interaction with the viewers.
48	9	"The Amusement Parking Lot!"	Jeff Astolfo	Robert Scull	Tillie Sain and Mykl Sivak	February 26, 2014	312
The Bubble Guppies take a drive in Mr. Grouper's car in an amusement parking lot, with fun and exciting tracks and cool amusement park-like rides for cars to drive on.: Pop Song: Wheels Go Round; Shop: Garage; Lunch Joke: Ma-car-oni and Cheese (Nonny); Storybook: Space Car Trip; Dance Song: Car Dance; Field Trip: Amusement Parking Lot
49	10	"Good Morning, Mr. Grumpfish!"	Jeff Astolfo	Jonny Belt and Robert Scull	John Quack Leard	February 28, 2014	303
While Mr. Grouper is at a dentist appointment, Mr. Grumpfish fills in for him. Problems arise when this grouchy substitute teacher claims he does not like anything. So, the Bubble Guppies recap on the best songs from Season 1 and show him that there are things to like.: Pop Song: Sing About Everything; Past Songs: It's a Beautiful Day, Super, Super, Supermarket, A Color Just Right, Restaurant, A Long Time Ago, A Bunch of Bones, and Sun, Beautiful Sun
50	11	"The Oyster Bunny!"	Jeff Astolfo	Robert Scull	Tillie Sain	April 14, 2014	311
The Bubble Guppies learn about baby animals and the mystical Oyster Bunny.: Pop Song: Baby Animals; Shop: Stuff Baby Animals; Lunch Joke: Baby Carrots (Nonny); Storybook: Antarctica Penguin Parents; Dance Song: Easter Dance; Field Trip: Easter Egg Hunt
51	12	"The Unidentified Flying Orchestra!"	Jeff Astolfo	Robert Scull	Tillie Sain and Mykl Sivak	May 20, 2014	314
The Bubble Guppies are excited to perform with an orchestra. Soon, a flying saucer appears. The conductor leaves to get his camera so he can take a picture of the flying saucer, leaving nobody to conduct. Eventually an alien comes out of the flying saucer and conducts the orchestra.: Pop Song: Orchestra Play For Me; Shop: Orchestra Percussion; Lunch Joke: Apple Juice with an Orche-straw (Nonny); Storybook: Orchestra Music Valley; Dance Song: Orchestra Dance; Field Trip: Orchestra Symphony
52	13	"Come to Your Senses!"	Jeff Astolfo	Jonny Belt, Robert Scull and Kevin Seccia	John Quack Leard, L.T. Myers, Tillie Sain and Mykl Sivak	May 22, 2014	315
Nonny breaks his glasses before school and cannot see anything. Eventually, he learns to use taste, touch, sight, hearing, and smell to navigate around a shopping mall to find the glasses store to retrieve his glasses after they have been fixed.: Pop Song: Come to Your Senses; Shop: I Spy Pie; Lunch Joke: Peanut Butter and Smelly Sandwich (Nonny); Storybook: Senses Rangers; Dance Song: Senses Dance; Field Trip: Shopping Mall
53	14	"The Bubble Bee-athalon!"	Jeff Astolfo	Robert Scull	Tillie Sain and Mykl Sivak	September 2, 2014	317
The Bubble Guppies become bees while living with the bees' life. They turn nectar into honey which is a lot of teamwork. The kids must work together to make honey for the queen bee's teatime.: Pop Song: Honey Bee; Shop: Honey Frozen Yogurt; Lunch Joke: Beesburger (Nonny); Storybook: Honey Nectar; Dance Song: Bee Dance; Field Trip: Bubble Bee Athalon
54	15	"Party at Sea!"	Jeff Astolfo	Jonny Belt and Robert Scull	Mykl Sivak	September 3, 2014	313
The Bubble Guppies go for an adventure on the party boat but, an ice ball falls into the ocean and the Guppies must save the boat.: Pop Song: Party at Sea + Reprise; Shop: Boat Captain Store; Lunch Joke: Potato Ships (Nonny); Short Song: Row, Row, Row Your Boat; Storybook: Islander Hawaii Sailboat; Dance Song: Boat Dance; Field Trip: Party Cruise Ship
55	16	"Bubble Scrubbies!"	Jeff Astolfo	Dustin Ferrer and Robert Scull	John Quack Leard, Tillie Sain and Mykl Sivak	September 23, 2014	319
The Bubble Guppies are looking into hygiene while Mr. Grouper is nursing his cold. The Guppies put on a parody of the television soap opera General Hospital.: Pop Song: Wash Them Off; Shop: Hygiene Palace; Short Song: Bubble Scrubbies; Lunch Joke: Sneezing Crackers (Nonny); Storybook: Super Hygiene Heroes; Dance Song: Hygiene Dance; Field Trip: Guppy General Hospital
56	17	"Swimtastic Check-Up!"	Jeff Astolfo	Randy Eisenberg and Robert Scull	Mykl Sivak	September 25, 2014	324
The Mayor gets a bad stomach ache while practicing for the "Bubbletucky Mayor-thon", so the guppies decided to have a marathon in the hospital.: Pop Song: Heartbeat; Shop: Organ Quiz; Lunch Joke: Peanut Butter and Belly Sandwich (Nonny); Storybook: Body Stomach; Dance Song: Organ Dance; Field Trip: Mayorthon
57	18	"Gobble Gobble Guppies!"	Jeff Astolfo	Dustin Ferrer and Robert Scull	John Quack Leard, Tillie Sain and Mykl Sivak	November 26, 2014	323
After Molly and Gil discovered the pumpkin patch is empty, their turkey friend leads them and their friends on a hunt for more pumpkins.: Pop Song: Leaves Are Falling; Shop: Thanksgiving Dinner; Short Song: Setting the Table; Lunch Joke: Roast Leaf Sandwich (Nonny); Storybook: Squirrel Acorn Party; Dance Song: Rake Them Up Dance; Field Trip: Pumpkin Patch
58	19	"A Very Guppy Christmas!"	Jeff Astolfo	Jonny Belt and Robert Scull	John Quack Leard, Tillie Sain and Mykl Sivak	December 12, 2014	320
Lobster Claws and his horse, named Snowflake, come to the rescue after Mr. Grouper's van gets stuck in the snow.: Pop Song: Holiday Ride; Shop: Neigh Neigh House; Lunch Joke: Macipony and Cheese (Nonny); Storybook: Snow Princess Horse Riding; Dance Song: Horse Ride Dance; Field Trip: Tree Farm; Short Song: Jingle Bells; Guest Star: Beau Bridges as Santa Claus/Mr. Claws
59	20	"Puddleball!"	Jeff Astolfo	Jonny Belt, Tim McKeon and Robert Scull	Mykl Sivak	January 27, 2015	316
The rain ruins a game called "Puddleball" after it spoils a kickball game, but Bubble Puppy has to overcome his fear of thunder in order to save the day and the puddleball game as well.: Pop Song: Awesomeness of Rain; Shop: Playground; Lunch Joke: Mozzebrella Stick (Nonny); Short Song: Rain Rain Go Away; Storybook: Strawberry Farm Yogurt; Dance Song: Rain Dance; Field Trip: Play Puddleball
60	21	"The Running of the Bullfrogs!"	Jeff Astolfo	Robert Scull and Randy Eisenberg	Tillie Sain and Mykl Sivak	January 29, 2015	318
Gil and Goby bring a tadpole, named Fernando, to school. As the day goes by, he becomes a frog, and is invited to the running of the bullfrogs and return to the pond.: Pop Song: Little Froggie; Shop: Frog City; Lunch Joke: Hopcorn (Nonny); Storybook: Dr Frogenstein; Dance Song: Frog Dance; Field Trip: Running Frog Race
61	22	"Bubble Kitty!"	Jeff Astolfo	Jonny Belt, Melinda LaRose and Robert Scull	John Quack Leard, L.T. Myers, Tillie Sain and Mykl Sivak	February 27, 2015	322
Molly and Gil saw a kitten named Bubble Kitty on their way to school, so they, Mr. Grouper and their friends try to find a home for her.: Pop Song: Here Kitty Kitty; Shop: Kitten Jungle Gym; Lunch Joke: Macaroni and Cheetah (Nonny); Storybook: Kitten Jungle Hearder; Dance Song: Cat Dance; Field Trip: Bubble Kitty Rushmore
62	23	"Super Guppies!"	Jeff Astolfo	Jonny Belt, Lucas Mills and Robert Scull	Mykl Sivak	May 1, 2015	326
Bubble Boy (Gil) and Guppy Girl (Molly) have to stop Sid Fishy (Ozzy Osbourne) from making Big Bubble City stinky.: Pop Song: Superheroes; Shop: Superhero Super Store; Lunch Joke: Super Salad (Nonny); Guest Star: Ozzy Osbourne as Sid Fishy
63	24	"A Dolphin is a Guppy's Best Friend!"	Jeff Astolfo	Jonny Belt, Lucas Mills and Robert Scull	John Quack Leard, Tillie Sain and Mykl Sivak	May 19, 2015	325
Molly and Gil and their friends are invited to Buddy the dolphin's first birthday party.: Pop Song: Hey Dolphin; Shop: Dolphin Echolocation; Lunch Joke: Tail Mix (Nonny); Storybook: Dolphin Ice Cream; Dance Song: Dolphin Dance; Field Trip: Buddy's House; Short Song: For He's a Jolly Good Dolphin

=== Season 4 (2015–2016) ===
No. overall	No. in season	Title	Directed by	Written by	Storyboard by	Original release date	Prod. code	U.S. viewers (millions)
64	1	"The Glitter Games!"	Robert Scull (supervising); Jeff Astolfo	Jonny Belt, Lucas Mills and Robert Scull	Mykl Sivak (director); Maurice Fontenot and Tillie Sain	May 21, 2015	402	1.39
The queen's daughter, Demanda, must use her manners if she wants to become a princess. Luckily, she had some help from Molly, who she befriends after the royal games.: Pop Song: So You Want to Be a Princess; Shop: Princess Manners; Lunch Joke: Unicorn Chips (Nonny); Storybook: Royal Mexico; Dance Song: Princess Dance; Field Trip: Royal Glitter Games; Short Song: The Royal Glitter Games + Reprise
65	2	"Costume Boxing!"	Robert Scull (supervising); Jeff Astolfo	Jonny Belt, Dustin Ferrer and Robert Scull	John Quack Leard (director); Maurice Fontenot	June 2, 2015	403	1.44
Molly performs in a costume boxing dress up match (host played by RuPaul) to be on a magazine during Fashion Week.: Pop Song: Dress Up; Shop: Fashion Warehouse; Lunch Joke: Hatdog (Nonny); Storybook: Dress Up Police; Dance Song: Fashion Dance; Field Trip: Costume Boxing Night; Guest Star: RuPaul as RuPearl
66	3	"The New Doghouse!"	Robert Scull (supervising); Jeff Astolfo	Jonny Belt, Dustin Ferrer and Robert Scull	Tillie Sain (director); Maurice Fontenot	June 4, 2015	401	1.10
The neighborhood works together with the help of Jimmy (Jimmie Johnson) to build Bubble Puppy a new doghouse after an accident involving a shopping cart destroys Bubble Puppy's old one.: Pop Song: In My Neighborhood; Shop: Neighborhood Navigation; Lunch Joke: Streetloaf (Nonny); Storybook: Fairytale Neighborhood; Dance Song: Neighborhood Dance; Field Trip: Neighborhood Edition; Guest Star: Jimmie Johnson as Jimmy
67	4	"Fruit Camp!"	Jeff Astolfo	Jonny Belt, Lucas Mills and Robert Scull	John Quack Leard, Tillie Sain and Mykl Sivak	June 19, 2015	321	N/A
Deema must try broccoli if she wants to earn her badge.: Pop Song: Fruit and Veggies; Shop: Food Bowling; Lunch Joke: Vegtickles (Nonny); Storybook: Space Harvest; Dance Song: Fruit Picking Dance; Field Trip: Fruit Camp Obstacle Course; Guest Star: Horatio Sanz as Sergeant Pickle
68	5	"Guppy Movers!"	Robert Scull (supervising); Jeff Astolfo	Jonny Belt, Robert Scull and Clark Stubbs	Tillie Sain (director); Maurice Fontenot	October 6, 2015	406	1.07
The guppies help a new kid named Skip feel comfortable when he and his family move into their new neighborhood.: Pop Song: Home; Shop: Home Builders; Lunch Joke: Home Fries (Nonny); Storybook: Cave People House; Dance Move: Home Dance; Field Trip: Skip House; Short Song: Guppy Movers
69	6	"Batterball!"	Robert Scull (supervising); Jeff Astolfo	Jonny Belt, Lucas Mills and Robert Scull	John Quack Leard (director); Maurice Fontenot	October 8, 2015	408	1.21
The guppies get to play "Batterball" after learning about safety and all the equipment in the kitchen.: Pop Song: In the Kitchen; Shop: Kitchen Boxing; Lunch Joke: Kitchen Pot Pie (Nonny); Storybook: Viking Cooking Kitchen; Dance Song: Kitchen Dance; Field Trip: Batterball Game
70	7	"The Temple of the Lost Puppy!"	Robert Scull (supervising); Jeff Astolfo	Jonny Belt, Dustin Ferrer and Robert Scull	Frank Gresham (director); Maurice Fontenot	November 13, 2015	407	1.15
When Bubble Puppy disappears after touching a cursed bone, Molly, Gil, and their friends must save him.: Pop Song: Puppy Here We Come + Reprise
71	8	"Space Guppies"	Robert Scull (supervising); Jeff Astolfo	Jonny Belt and Robert Scull	Tillie Sain (director); Maurice Fontenot	January 15, 2016	410	0.95
The guppies must stop Major Bummer (George Takei) from eliminating music from all over the galaxy.: Pop Song: My Favorite Song + Reprise; Guest Star: George Takei as Major Bummer
72	9	"The New Year's Dragon!"	Robert Scull (supervising); Jeff Astolfo	Jonny Belt, Laura Kleinbaum and Robert Scull	Jeff Hong (director); Maurice Fontenot	February 5, 2016	409	1.15
By learning all about China, the guppies get to operate the puppet dragon at the Chinese New Year parade.: Pop Song: Check Out China; Shop: Pandamonium; Lunch Joke: Pandawich (Nonny); Storybook: Chinese New Year Village; Dance Song: China Dance; Field Trip: Chinese New Year Parade; Guest Stars: James Hong and Matthew Moy as Ming and Ping
73	10	"Sheep Doggy!"	Robert Scull (supervising); Jeff Astolfo	Jonny Belt, Lucas Mills and Robert Scull	Maurice Fontenot, Brad Rodriguez and Tillie Sain	March 29, 2016	411	1.26
Bubble Puppy has to be a sheepdog after Wooly, the baby lamb, wanders off from a party during a literal popcorn storm.: Pop Song: Down Here on the Farm; Shop: Farmers Market; Lunch Joke: Tractoroni and Cheese (Nonny); Storybook: Old MacNonny Had a Farm (Parody of Old MacDonald Had a Farm); Dance Song: Farmer Dance; Field Trip: Barnyard Party
74	11	"Bubble Baby!"	Robert Scull (supervising); Jeff Astolfo	Jonny Belt, Lucas Mills and Robert Scull	Tillie Sain (director); Maurice Fontenot	March 31, 2016	414	1.49
The guppies are excited when Molly tells them that she is going to be a big sister.: Pop Song: Hey Baby; Past Song: Baby Animals, Come to Your Senses, Once Upon a Time, and Home; Field Trip: Maternity Hospital; Short Song: Off to Sleep You Go
75	12	"Guppy Style!"	Robert Scull (supervising); Jeff Astolfo	Jonny Belt, Robert Scull and Clark Stubbs	Maurice Fontenot, John Quack Leard, Tillie Sain and Mykl Sivak	April 29, 2016	997	1.35
The guppies and Mr. Grouper go on a road trip to the Big Bubble Arena to see Stylee (Keke Palmer), a famous pop star for her hair styles, but come across many obstacles along the way.: Field Trip: Stylee Concert/Big Bubble Arena; Songs: Rock Your Style + Reprise, Country Style, Sport Style, Beach Style, Fancy Style; Lunch Joke: Corn Dog with a Hair Style (Nonny); Guest Star: Keke Palmer as Stylee
76	13	"The Summer Camp Games!"	Robert Scull (supervising); Jeff Astolfo	Jonny Belt and Robert Scull	Jeff Hong (director); Maurice Fontenot	June 10, 2016	413	1.13
Summer is here and the guppies celebrate with much outdoor fun. However, they have to use their summer camping skills they learnt in the Summer Camp Games in order to save Bubble Puppy.: Pop Song: Summertime; Shop: Summer Supplies Store; Lunch Joke: Ice Cream with Sprinklers (Nonny); Storybook: Cowgirl Lemonade Stand; Dance Song: Summer Dance; Field Trip: Summer Camp Games
77	14	"Trick-or-Treat, Mr. Grumpfish!"	Robert Scull (supervising); Jeff Astolfo	Jonny Belt, Robert Scull and Clark Stubbs	Tillie Sain (director); Maurice Fontenot	October 21, 2016	412	1.29
The guppies have to make their classroom very spooky if they want to scare Mr. Grumpfish.: Pop Song: Trick or Treat + Reprise; Shop: Costumestein; Lunch Joke: Ice Scream Cone (Nonny); Storybook: Halloween Night; Dance Song: Halloween Dance; Field Trip: School Halloween Party

=== Season 5 (2019–2021) ===
No. overall	No. in season	Title	Directed by	Written by	Storyboard by	Original release date	Prod. code	U.S. viewers (millions)
78	1	"The New Guppy!"	Rick Marshall	Jonny Belt and Robert Scull	Dave Pemberton, Agnes Salek and Rich Vanatte	September 27, 2019 (Note: This episode was released online on the Nick Jr. app and on YouTube on September 24, 2019.)	501	0.64
When the Sea Witch steal the Bubble Guppies' magical jewels so she can rule the Seven Seas, the Guppies must stop her and get their jewels back before it's too late, with the help of their new guppy friend, Zooli.: Pop Song: Ocean Animals + Reprise; Storybook: The Jewels of the Seven Seas; Shop: Narwhal-Mart; Lunch Joke: Sand-wich (Gil); Guest Star: Carol Kane as the Sea Witch
79	2	"Secret Agent Nonny!"	Rick Marshall	Jonny Belt and Robert Scull	Emma Nuttall, Agnes Salek and Steve Whitehouse	October 14, 2019	503	0.68
In this Bubble Guppies parody of James Bond, Secret Agent Nonny, who stays cool under pressure, a man of few words, and one of the world's top secret agents in children's television history, is sent on a mission to the other agents to deliver their messages, unknown about his surprise birthday party at Dr. Bigmouth Bass' island.: Pop Song: Geography + Reprise; Storybook: Nonny's Surprise Mission; Shop: Spy Gear; Lunch Joke: Burger with Secret Sauce (Nonny); Short Song: Happy Birthday to You; Guest Stars: Tracy Morgan as Dr. Bigmouth Bass and Alysia Reiner as the Computer Voice
80	3	"The Kingdom of Clean!"	Rick Marshall	Jonny Belt and Robert Scull	Dave Pemberton, Agnes Salek and Rich Vanatte	November 1, 2019	502	0.70
Dirty Deema the evil ruler wants a medieval kingdom to stay dirty, with Crudly the giant ogre as her assistant and the Knights of Clean under her curse. Molly and Gil must stop them and get the kingdom clean again.: Pop Song: Healthy Habits + Reprise; Storybook: A Royal Mess; Lunch Joke: Mozzarella Stink (Nonny)
81	4	"The Good, the Sad, and the Grumpy!"	Rick Marshall	Clark Stubbs	Emma Nuttall, Agnes Salek and Steve Whitehouse	November 22, 2019	504	0.57
When Mr. Grumpfish turns up in Happy Junction, he makes everyone in town really grumpy, including Sheriff Molly, who must find a way to help everyone handle their tricky emotions.: Pop Song: Feelings; Storybook: Rodeo Feeling Junction; Shop: Pancake Emotion; Lunch Joke: Frownie (Nonny)
82	5	"Ocean Patrol!"	Rick Marshall	Marty Johnson	Dave Pemberton, Agnes Salek and Rich Vanatte	January 3, 2020	505	0.66
The Guppies must stop Windy Pete and first mate Oona when they sail around the world and blast tropical climates with snow.: Pop Song: Whether The Weather + Reprise; Storybook: Ocean Pirate Weather Patrol; Shop: Beach Fashion Clothes; Lunch Joke: Chilly Chili (Nonny); Guest Star: Alice Cooper as Windy Pete
83	6	"Rockin' Out!"	Rick Marshall	Sue Galloway	Emma Nuttall, Agnes Salek and Steve Whitehouse	January 17, 2020	506	0.52
Goby and Gil go on a quest to get a geode at the top of a volcano, then try to make it back to the Rocky Valley Rock Show in time to enter the contest for best rock.: Pop Song: Rock Out + Reprise; Storybook: Dino Rock Show; Shop: Art Painting Picture; Lunch Joke: Ice Cream Stone (Oona)
84	7	"Genie in a Bubble!"	Rick Marshall	Monique D. Hall	Jose Pou, Agnes Salek and Steve Whitehouse	February 14, 2020	509	0.50
When Nonny, Gil, and Zooli conjure a genie, she promises to grant them any wish they want.: Pop Song: Gemstones; Storybook: Genie Quest; Lunch Joke: Toast with Strawberry Gem (Nonny); Guest Star: Jane Lynch as the Genie
85	8	"A Furry Tale!"	Rick Marshall	Sarah Jenkins and Adam Peltzman	Liesl Adams, Dave Pemberton and Agnes Salek	March 6, 2020	507	0.49
Hansel and Gretel have to get Bubble Puppy and Bubble Kitty home safe to the Furry Godmother, but they’re being stalked by a witch.: Pop Song: Four Legs and Fur; Storybook: Hansel and Gretel; Shop: Pet Store; Lunch Joke: Pup-eroni Pizza (Nonny); Guest Star: Amy Sedaris as the Witch/the Furry Godmother
86	9	"Super Baby!"	Rick Marshall	Jonny Belt and Robert Scull	Jose Pou, Agnes Salek and Steve Whitehouse	April 10, 2020	513	0.70
When supervillain Ms. Goo Goo and Bub Bun start changing everyone into babies, it's up to Guppy Girl and Bubble Boy, with some extra help from Molly's little sister, Mia, to stop her before they also get turned into babies.: Pop Song: Hey, Hey, Baby; Storybook: Babies Invasion City; Guest Star: Cyndi Lauper as Ms. Goo Goo
87	10	"Dragons N' Roses!"	Rick Marshall	Caitlin Hodson	Dave Pemberton, Agnes Salek and Steve Whitehouse	May 29, 2020	508	0.60
When Agnes the Dragon moves to the Kingdom of Roses, King Goby, Oona the Strong, Gil the Brave, and everyone else is afraid of her fearsome roar, except for Zooli, who befriends Agnes and shows her friends how lovable Agnes really is.: Pop Song: Be Curious; Storybook: The Kingdom of Flowers; Shop: Armor Metal; Lunch Joke: Roar-ange (Nonny); Guest Star: Kristen Schaal as Agnes the Dragon
88	11	"Ninja Season!"	Rick Marshall	Mario López-Cordero	Emma Nuttall, Dave Pemberton and Agnes Salek	June 19, 2020	512	0.41
Gil wants to be a ninja, but his ninja teacher just keeps giving him random tasks to do; frustrated, Gil is about to give up when another ninja known as Rakunuki comes out and challenges him, and he realizes he's been learning ninja skills all along.: Pop Song: Seasons Go Around and Around; Storybook: Ninja School; Lunch Joke: Cup-rake (Gil); Guest Star: George Takei as Master Rakunuki
89	12	"Snow Squad to the Rescue!"	Rick Marshall	Marty Johnson	Jose Pou, Agnes Salek and Steve Whitehouse	July 3, 2020	511	0.38
Gil, Deema, and Oona investigate as the Snow Patrol to find out who stole Molly, Goby, Nonny, and Zooli's sleeping bags, as Gil is convinced that a snow yeti is the one to blame, much to Oona's dismay.: Pop Song: Ice, Water or Snow; Storybook: The Snow Squad; Lunch Joke: Ice and Beans (Gil); Guest Star: Henry Winkler as the Yeti
90	13	"Too Bright for Movie Night!"	Rick Marshall	Andrew Moriarty	Emma Nuttall, Dave Pemberton and Agnes Salek	August 14, 2020	510	0.53
If the Moon People, led by Queen Molly, can find a way to make it dark during the day, the Sun People, led by Queen Deema, will agree to turn off their giant night light so the Moon People can enjoy their movie night. Luckily, a dragon named Pretzel Quatel helps Queen Molly, Goby, and Nonny figure out about a solar eclipse.: Pop Song: Sun and Moon and Day and Night; Storybook: Moon People vs Sun People; Lunch Joke: Moon-caroni and Cheese (Nonny)
91	14	"The Guppies Save Christmas!"	Rick Marshall	Miden Wood	Agnes Salek, Matt Roach and Craig Valde	December 4, 2020	515	0.35
On Christmas Eve, Mr. Grouper tells the Bubble Guppies the story of how Gil, Molly and Bubble Puppy discover Santa's lost list in the snow. To return the list safely to the North Pole, they have to keep it out of the hands of the Christmas-hating Humbug.: Pop Song: I’d Love to Spend My Christmas with You; Storybook: Christmas List Return; Shop: Map Search; Lunch Joke: Pea-nutcracker and Jelly (Nonny)
92	15	"The Mighty, Untidy Titans!"	Rick Marshall	Jonny Belt, Leah Gotcisk and Robert Scull	Agnes Salek, Kirsten Whiteley and Steve Whitehouse	January 22, 2021	514	0.47
When some untidy Titans (played by Molly, Gil and Goby) start messing up Zooli, Nonny and Oona's goat farm, the goat herders must journey to the Titans' cloud realm to ask them to tidy up.: Pop Song: Chores!; Storybook: The Island of Titans; Shop: Titan Search; Lunch Joke: Salad with Dress Dressing (Goby)
93	16	"Alison in Wonderland!"	Rick Marshall	Jonny Belt, Caitlin Hodson and Robert Scull	Kelly Erwin, Agnes Salek and Steve Whitehouse	February 12, 2021	518	0.36
Mail Carrier Molly tries to deliver a Friendship Day card for someone named Alison in a place called Wonderland; the card-stealing Queen of Hearts bans Friendship Day across the land.: Pop Song: Won't Ya Send Me?; Storybook: Mail Carrier Molly; Shop: Map of Wonderland; Lunch Joke: Bean and Cheese Purr-ito (Deema); Guest Star: Rachel Dratch as the Queen of Hearts/Alison Heart
94	17	"It's a Lizard!"	Rick Marshall	Jonny Belt, Marty Johnson and Robert Scull	Agnes Salek, Kirsten Whiteley and Steve Whitehouse	February 26, 2021	516	0.41
When showman Gil's real life dragon (actually a Komodo dragon) gets loose in the small town of Bubbleville, it's up to Pet Finders Oona and Zooli to track the lizard down and return it to its home on Komodo Island.: Pop Song: It’s a Lizard!; Storybook: The Pet Finders; Shop: Animal Finder; Lunch Joke: Hot dog and a tail salad (Nonny)
95	18	"Swinging in the Rainforest!"	Rick Marshall	Jonny Belt, Robert Scull and Clark Stubbs	Agnes Salek, Matt Roach and Craig Valde	March 5, 2021	517	0.36
City-slicker umbrella sellers Molly and Gil set up shop in the Amazon rainforest.: Pop Song: Amazing Amazon; Storybook: Umbrella Search; Shop: Animal Sounds; Lunch Joke: Pepper-rainy Pizza (Nonny)

=== Season 6 (2021–2023) ===
No. overall	No. in season	Title	Directed by	Written by	Storyboard by	Original release date	Prod. code	U.S. viewers (millions)
96	1	"Werewolves of Bubbledon!"	Rick Marshall	Mario López-Cordero and Noah Wait	Agnes Salek, Sola Shin and Steve Whitehouse	October 19, 2021	601	0.28
Pop Song: Solve a Mystery!; Storybook: The Halloween Detectives; Shop: Crystal Clue; Lunch Joke: French Ghost (Gil)
97	2	"Fogzilla!"	Rick Marshall	Jonny Belt, Robert Scull and Ed Valentine	Kelly Erwin, Agnes Salek and Steve Whitehouse	November 8, 2021	520	0.21
Pop Song: Shine Your Light On Me; Storybook: Foggy Harbor; Shop: Lost and Flounder; Lunch Joke: Brownie Lights (Zooli); Guest Star: Cheech Marin as Fogzilla
98	3	"Bigfoot Crossing!"	Rick Marshall	Jonny Belt, Leah Gotcisk, Monique D. Hall and Robert Scull	Agnes Salek, Matt Roach and Craig Valde	November 9, 2021	521	0.37
Pop Song: Stop Look and Listen; Storybook: The Park Rangers; Shop: Ranger Supply Station; Lunch Joke: Horn Bread (Oona)
99	4	"A Load of Litterbugs!"	Rick Marshall	Jonny Belt, Robert Scull and Bryan Wysol	Lynn Reist, Agnes Salek and Steve Whitehouse	November 10, 2021	522	0.31
Pop Song: Sort It Out!; Storybook: U.S.S. Recycler; Lunch Joke: Trashed Potatoes (Nonny); Guest Star: Ice-T as Garbage Khan
100	5	"A Giant Harvest Day!"	Rick Marshall	Carin Greenberg, Lindsey Owen and Noah Wait	Agnes Salek, Sola Shin and Steve Whitehouse	November 11, 2021	603	0.41
Pop Song: This Harvest Day! (Food Groups); Storybook: The Holiday Cooks; Lunch Joke: Moo-berries (Gil); Guest Star: Brad Garrett as Tall Punyan
101	6	"Christmas is Coming!"	Rick Marshall	Susan Kim	Fancia Meng He, Sola Shin and Craig Valde	December 7, 2021	602	0.37
Pop Song: That's How You Know It's Christmas!; Storybook: The Kingdom of Winteros; Shop: Winter Fashion Clothes; Lunch Joke: Ham and Freeze Sandwich (Goby); Guest Star: David Cross as The Freezy Dragon
102	7	"The Holiday Pirates!"	Rick Marshall	Davey Moore, Mario López-Cordero and Dava Savel	Agnes Salek, Sola Shin and Steve Whitehouse	December 31, 2021	605	0.51
Pop Song: It's a Holiday!; Storybook: Holiday Land; Lunch Joke: Parrot Stick (Gil); Guest Star: Whoopi Goldberg as Pirate Myra
103	8	"Bubble Puppysaurus!"	Rick Marshall	Jonny Belt, Mario López-Cordero and Robert Scull	Agnes Salek, Sola Shin and Steve Whitehouse	January 14, 2022	526	0.32
Pop Song: Stronger; Storybook: Bubble Rock City; Shop: Tough Roarier Training Course; Lunch Joke: Exer-fries (Deema)
104	9	"Winter Sports Chompetition"	Rick Marshall	Marty Johnson	Mike Csunyoscka, Fancia Meng He and Sola Shin	February 9, 2022	606	0.22
Pop Song: Win the Winter!; Storybook: Mt. Brrr!; Lunch Joke: Skater Tots (Nonny); Guest Star: Joe Manganiello as Coldsnap
105	10	"The SS Friendship!"	Rick Marshall	Craig Carlisle	Fancia Meng He, Sola Shin and Craig Valde	February 14, 2022	604	0.24
Pop Song: Ocean Habitats; Storybook: S.S. Friendship; Lunch Joke: Reef Burger (Gil); Guest Star: Margaret Cho as Lucy the Kraken
106	11	"Something Fishy Going On!"	Rick Marshall	Jonny Belt, Caitlin Hodson and Robert Scull	Matt Roach, Sola Shin and Craig Valde	March 11, 2022	523	0.35
Pop Song: Up All Night; Storybook: Sleepy Shallow; Shop: Bat Echolocation; Lunch Joke: Sleep-peas (Gil)
107	12	"Robo Puppy!"	Rick Marshall	Clark Stubbs	Agnes Salek, Sola Shin and Steve Whitehouse	April 29, 2022	607	0.28
Pop Song: Robots!; Storybook: Robotopolis; Lunch Joke: Spaghetti and Meat-Bots (Nonny); Guest Star: Alan Cumming as The Glitch
108	13	"Race to the Oasis!"	Rick Marshall	Jonny Belt, Mario López-Cordero and Robert Scull	Agnes Salek, Sola Shin and Steve Whitehouse	May 20, 2022	524	0.40
Pop Song: In the Desert; Storybook: The Oasis; Lunch Joke: Snake Pop (Gil); Guest Star: Joan Jett as The Leader of the Rattlers
109	14	"Escape from Volcano Island!"	Rick Marshall	Jonny Belt, Eric Saiet and Robert Scull	Matt Roach, Sola Shin and Craig Valde	June 10, 2022	525	0.32
Pop Song: Whatever Floats Your Boat!; Storybook: Volcano Island; Lunch Joke: Crab Apple (Deema); Guest Star: James Urbaniak as Julius Rangoon
110	15	"Mountain Ninja Rescue!"	Trevor Hierons	Mario López-Cordero	Christos Katopodis, Sola Shin, Steve Whitehouse and Na Rae Yun	July 15, 2022	615	0.18
Pop Song: Climb A Mountain!; Storybook: Mt. Danger; Lunch Joke: Ramen With A Storm (Goby)
111	16	"The Jaw-some Sharkventure!"	Trevor Hierons	Marty Johnson	Emma Frew, Sola Shin and Craig Valde	July 29, 2022	609	0.32
Pop Song: One Cool Fish; Short Song: Baby Shark + Reprise; Storybook: The Jaw-some Sharkventure; Shop: Submarine Supply Shop; Lunch Joke: Boat-meal Cookie (Nonny); Guest Stars: Richard Dreyfuss as Captain Acrab, Kimiko Glenn as Baby Shark, Luke Youngblood as William, Natasha Rothwell as Mommy Shark, and Eric Edelstein as Daddy Shark
112	17	"Taste Buddies!"	Rick Marshall	Jonny Belt, Robert Scull and Clark Stubbs	Agnes Salek, Matt Roach and Craig Valde	September 30, 2022	519	0.22
Pop Song: We Got Good Taste; Storybook: Bland Land; Lunch Joke: Bland Bread (Gil); Guest Star: John Waters as Baron Von Bland
113	18	"The Kingdom of Sleepwell!"	Trevor Hierons	Mario López-Cordero	Emma Frew, Sola Shin and Craig Valde	October 10, 2022	608	0.17
Pop Song: Sleep; Storybook: The Kingdom of Sleepwell; Lunch Joke: Snoozie (Deema)
114	19	"A Big Splash!"	Rick Marshall	Angelo DeCesare	Agnes Salek, Sola Shin and Steve Whitehouse	October 11, 2022	611	0.18
Pop Song: Island Life + Reprise; Storybook: Shimmy-Shimmy Islands; Lunch Joke: Beach Pie (Gil); Guest Star: Ariana DeBose as Lulu the Blue Whale
115	20	"Bubble Medics to the Rescue!"	Trevor Hierons	Lindsey Owen	Christos Katopodis, Sola Shin, Steve Whitehouse and Na Rae Yun	October 12, 2022	613	0.24
Pop Song: You Make Me Feel Better; Storybook: Greek Bubble Medics; Lunch Joke: Barb-achoo-Chicken (Gil); Guest Star: James Monroe Iglehart as Cy the Cyclops
116	21	"Search for the Great Silverback!"	Trevor Hierons	Susan Kim	Emma Frew, Craig Valde and Na Rae Yun	October 13, 2022	614	0.21
Pop Song: Hey Gorilla; Storybook: The Temple of the Great Silverback; Lunch Joke: Gorilla Cupcake (Gil); Guest Star: Wallace Shawn as Professor Puny
117	22	"Don't Yuck My Yum!"	Trevor Hierons	Caitlin Hodson	Sola Shin, Steve Whitehouse and Na Rae Yun	October 14, 2022	617	0.19
Pop Song: Let's Cook Some Food!; Storybook: Gourmet Galaxy; Lunch Joke: Spaghetti with Spacey Meatballs (Gil); Guest Star: Retta as General Yuck
118	23	"Mystery on the Guppy Express!"	Rick Marshall	Evan Sinclair	Agnes Salek, Sola Shin and Steve Whitehouse	October 31, 2022	610	0.18
Pop Song: Away We Go!; Storybook: The Guppy Express; Lunch Joke: Choo-Choo Chewy Oatmeal Bar (Molly)
119	24	"Puppy Girl and Super Pup!"	Trevor Hierons	Marty Johnson	Emma Frew, Craig Valde and Na Rae Yun	November 1, 2022	618	0.24
Pop Song: They're Purr-Fect; Storybook: Puppy Girl and Super Pup; Lunch Joke: Paw-berries (Nonny); Guest Star: Kate Mulgrew as Felina Meow
120	25	"The Fastest Feather in the Race!"	Trevor Hierons	Clark Stubbs	Sola Shin, Steve Whitehouse and Na Rae Yun	November 2, 2022	619	0.15
Pop Song: Flightless Birds; Storybook: The Fastest Feather Race; Shop: Wheel Impourium; Lunch Joke: Squakamole (Gil)
121	26	"The Solar Light Spectacular!"	Rick Marshall	Michael Kaufman	Emma Frew, Dae Jung, Craig Valde and Na Rae Yun	November 3, 2022	620	0.18
Pop Song: Solar Power + Reprise; Storybook: Solar City; Lunch Joke: Cinnamon Sun (Nonny); Guest Star: Jay Pharoah as Buster the Robot
122	27	"The Kingdom of Laughs-a-Lot!"	Trevor Hierons	Marty Johnson	Emma Frew, Sola Shin and Craig Valde	November 11, 2022	612	0.21
Pop Song: Tell Me A Joke; Storybook: The Funny Jesters; Lunch Joke: Laugharoni and Cheese (Oona)
123	28	"The Big Rig Bandit!"	Rick Marshall	Noah Wait	Emma Frew, Craig Valde and Na Rae Yun	December 9, 2022	616	0.14
.: Pop Song: Savannah, Savannah, A Wild Savannah; Shop: Big Rig Repair Shop; Storybook: The African Savannah; Lunch Joke: Savannah Bread (Gil); Guest Star: Timothy Olyphant as Spotty Cackles
124	29	"The Ultra Spy Tool!"	Trevor Hierons	Noah Wait	Emma Frew, Dae Jung and Tiya Zhong	March 24, 2023	625	0.21
Pop Song: Tools!; Storybook: The Ultra Spy Tool; Lunch Joke: Wrench-Fries (Nonny); Guest Star: Jake Green as Dr. Coldfinger
125	30	"Zooli's New Pet!"	Trevor Hierons	Lindsey Owen	Sola Shin and Na Rae Yun	June 9, 2023	621	0.17
Pop Song: Seahorse Little Seahorse; Past Songs: A Puppy Is A Guppy's Best Friend, Here Kitty Kitty, It's a Lizard, The Elephant Song, and Ocean Animals
126	31	"Trouble in Harmony Valley!"	Trevor Hierons	Lindsey Owen	Sola Shin, Steve Whitehouse and Na Rae Yun	June 16, 2023	622	0.17
Pop Song: Everyone Can Make Music + 2 Reprises; Storybook: Harmony Valley; Lunch Joke: Chocolate Guitar (Nonny); Guest Star: Scott MacArthur as Billy Joe Strumlouder
127	32	"The Three Guppeteers!"	Rick Marshall	Allan Neuwirth and Dava Savel	Sola Shin, Steve Whitehouse and Tiya Zhong	June 23, 2023	626	0.16
Pop Song: Teamwork; Storybook: The Three Guppeteers; Lunch Joke: Gargoyled Egg (Deema)
128	33	"A Slow Day in Zippy City!"	Trevor Hierons	Mario López-Cordero	Emma Frew, Dae Jung and Tiya Zhong	June 30, 2023	623	N/A
Pop Song: They’re Opposites!; Storybook: Zippy City; Lunch Joke: Cold Dog (Goby); Guest Star: Chazz Palminteri as Tiny the Slug
129	34	"See You Later, Alligator!"	Rick Marshall	Michael Kaufman	Sola Shin, Steve Whitehouse and Tiya Zhong	June 30, 2023	624	N/A
Pop Song: All Kinds Of Eggs!; Storybook: Bayou River Adventure; Lunch Joke: Gator Tots (Nonny)
