= Catherine Ashmore Bradley =

American actress

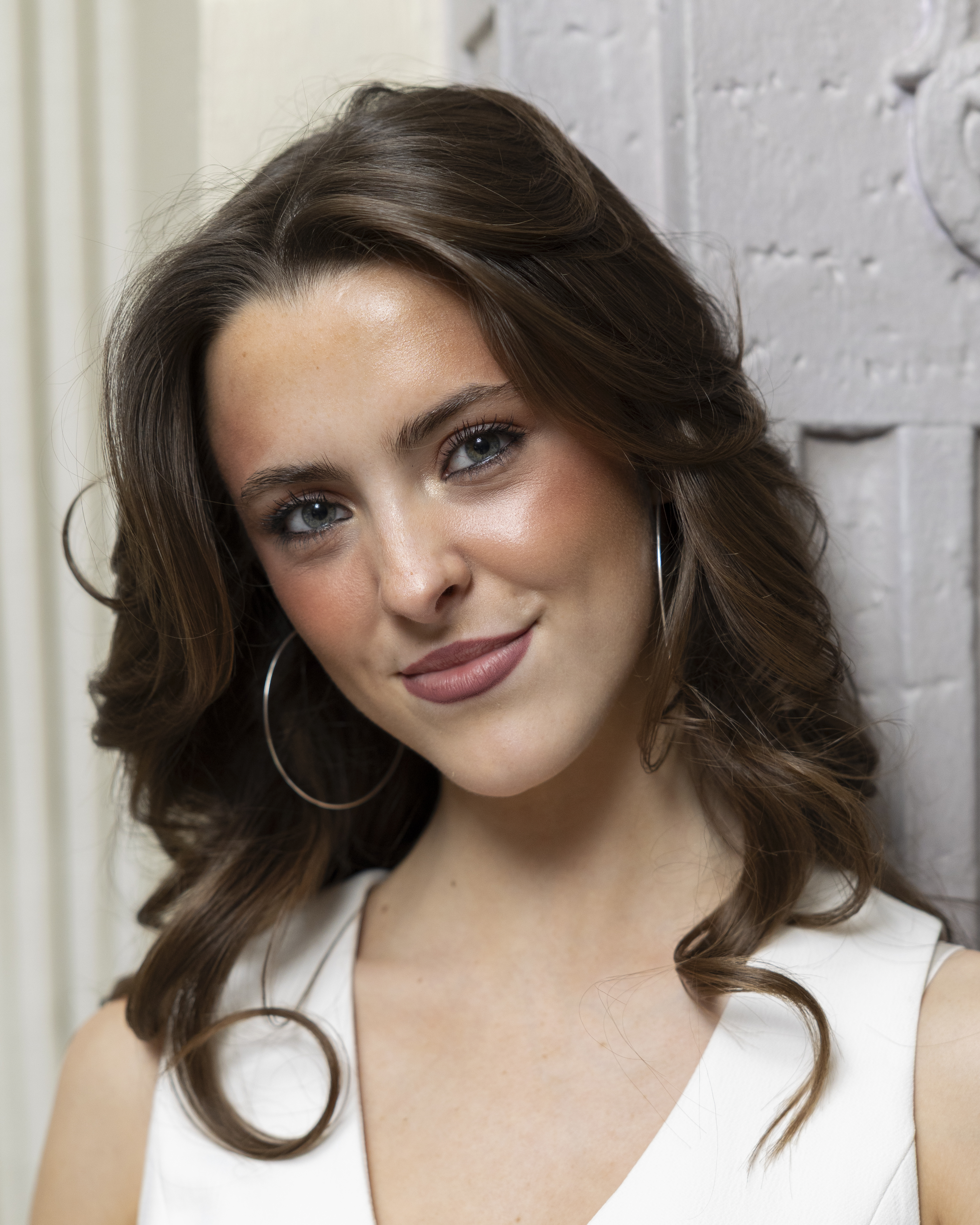
- Education: Ranney School, HSD
- Occupation: Actress
- Years active: 2017–present
- Relatives: Aubin Bradley (sister)

Catherine Ashmore Bradley is an American actress. She made her Broadway debut as a child performer in Harry Potter and the Cursed Child and voiced Deema in the Nick Jr. animated series Bubble Guppies. She is best known for playing Luan Loud in the Nickelodeon live-action comedy series The Really Loud House (2022–2024) and in its two related television films, A Loud House Christmas (2021) and A Really Haunted Loud House (2023), opposite her younger sister Aubin Bradley, who plays Lucy Loud.

== Early life ==
Bradley is the older sister of actress Aubin Bradley, with whom she has appeared in the live-action Loud House projects. Both sisters began performing as children, with Bradley first working in theater before moving into television and film. Bradley attended the Ranney School in Tinton Falls, New Jersey for high school.

== Career ==
=== Theatre ===
Bradley began her career on the stage and made her Broadway debut as a young cast member in the original Broadway production of Harry Potter and the Cursed Child at the Lyric Theatre, in the role of Lily Potter.

=== Television and film ===
Bradley voiced Deema in the fifth season of the Nick Jr. animated series Bubble Guppies. In 2021, she was cast as Luan Loud in the live-action television film A Loud House Christmas, based on the animated series The Loud House, with her sister Aubin playing Lucy Loud. The sisters reprised their roles in the spin-off series The Really Loud House, greenlit by Nickelodeon in 2022, and in the follow-up television film A Really Haunted Loud House (2023).

== Filmography ==
=== Film ===
Year	Title	Role	Notes
2019	Mr. Sam	Sandra Polley	Short film
2021	40 Nickels	Sarah	Short film

=== Television ===
Year	Title	Role	Notes
2017	Happy!	Penny Baker	1 episode
2019–2022	Bubble Guppies	Deema (voice)	Main voice role; season 5
2021	A Loud House Christmas	Luan Loud	Television film
2021	Law & Order: Special Victims Unit	Charlotte Davis	Episode: "Post-Graduate Psychopath"
2022	City on a Hill	Julietta Caysen	1 episode
2022–2024	The Really Loud House	Luan Loud	Main role
2023	A Really Haunted Loud House	Luan Loud	Television film
