= List of The Casagrandes episodes =

The Casagrandes is an American animated comedy television series developed by Michael Rubiner and Miguel Puga that aired on Nickelodeon from October 14, 2019 to September 30, 2022. The series features the voices of Izabella Alvarez, Carlos PenaVega, Sumalee Montano, Sonia Manzano, Ruben Garfias, Carlos Alazraqui, Roxana Ortega, Alexa PenaVega, Jared Kozak, Alex Cazares, Cristina Milizia, Dee Bradley Baker, and Eugenio Derbez.

== Series overview ==
Season	Segments	Episodes	Originally released	
Season	Segments	Episodes	First released	Last released
1	38	25	October 14, 2019	September 25, 2020
2	37	21	October 9, 2020	September 10, 2021
3	37	24	September 17, 2021	September 30, 2022

== Episodes ==
=== Season 1 (2019–20) ===
No. overall	No. in season	Title	Directed by	Written by	Storyboarded by	Original release date	Prod. code	U.S. viewers (millions)
1	1	"Going Overboard"	Miguel Puga	Alejandro Bien-Willner	Rebecca Schauer	October 14, 2019 (Note: "Going Overboard" was first released on YouTube on September 27, 2019.)	101	0.61
1	1	"Walk Don't Run"	Mike Nordstrom	Rosemary Contreras	Raymond Santos	October 14, 2019	101	0.61
"Going Overboard": As Frida prepares to show off her hip art to a gallery owner named Romeo (Wilson Cruz) at the Art Space Gallery, Ronnie Anne finds out that Carlos used to be a skateboarder named Carlos X and learns some moves from him. They work to keep the lessons from Frida who didn't want Carlos to get injured. When Carlos gets injured upon the constant night lessons exhausting him, Ronnie works to hide his injury from Frida. "Walk Don't Run": Ronnie Anne is in need of a new skateboard after it gets destroyed by the Street Cats while Sid wants a full cut-out of Yoon Kwan of Twelve is Midnight. After helping to walk Mr. Nakamura's dog Nelson, Ronnie Anne and Sid plan to walk the dogs of Miranda's dog Ninja, Mrs. Flores dog Buttercup, Margarita's dogs Fluffy and Pickles, and Vito Filliponio's dogs Big Tony and Little Sal as well as Lalo to make more money. They must work to keep the dogs under control when it comes to the Street Cats and a strict dogcatcher.
2	2	"New Haunts"	Mike Nordstrom	Gloria Shen	Chelsea Holt	October 19, 2019	103A	0.93
On Halloween, Ronnie Anne and Sid have been invited to Kingston's Halloween party. When they arrive, they find that it is not a costume party. When it ends in disaster, Ronnie Anne and Sid try to have a Halloween party at the skateboard party held by Sameer that is a costume party. Meanwhile, Bobby, C.J., and Carl set up the mercado for the Haunted Mercado as Bobby teaches C.J. and Carl the Vampire Boogie.
3	3	"Croaked"	Miguel Puga	Lalo Alcaraz	David Teas	October 26, 2019 (Note: This episode was first released on Youtube on October 22, 2019.)	103B	0.99
On Day of the Dead, Ronnie Anne and Sid learn from Rosa about the Day of the Dead as Carl is sent to lay a trail for their ancestors to follow. As Adelaide's pet frog Froggy has died, Ronnie Anne and Sid help Adelaide teach her about Day of the Dead by renting a frog from Pete's Pets. In addition, Adelaide wants to be visited by the spirits of Great Aunt Millie, Mr. Woodruff, and Abraham Lincoln causing Ronnie Anne and Sid to portray them with the help of Carlos. When it all goes wrong, the girls turn to Rosa for help.
4	4	"The Two of Clubs"	Mike Nordstrom	Richard Goodman	Diem Doan	November 2, 2019	102	1.09
4	4	"Vacation Daze"	Miguel Puga	Adeline Colangelo	Nic Parris	November 2, 2019	102	1.09
"The Two of Clubs": At Cesar Chavez Academy, Ronnie Anne and Sid plan to pick an activity that they can do together so that they won't lose hang time. They try things like lucha libre, robotics, pottery, knitting, and cooking which goes comically awry. "Vacation Daze": Maria has the day off as Ronnie Anne wants to spend the day with her. As Maria came in late, Rosa is concerned that she is getting worn out as the new nurse Linda keeps calling her. The rest of the family start asking for help for their emergencies and other stuff much to the dismay of Ronnie Anne.
5	5	"Snack Pact"	Mike Nordstrom	Rosemary Contreras	Raymond Santos	November 9, 2019	104	0.93
5	5	"The Horror-Scope"	Miguel Puga	Adeline Colangelo	Rebecca Schauer	November 9, 2019	104	0.93
"Snack Pact": While the Casagrande family is awaiting for Rosa to be done with the cooking, Ronnie Anne shows them the tamale that she got from the new tamale food truck which they get hooked on. To evade having Rosa find out, they must work to get the tamales using every trick at different positions even when Sergio starts to get on to them. "The Horror-Scope": Ronnie Anne watches a show starring Ernesto Estrella (George Lopez) with Rosa where she doesn't believe in horoscopes. Lincoln Loud is in town where Rita Loud has a meeting in Great Lakes City as Rosa suspects that Ronnie Anne will fall in love with Lincoln. Suspicious that Ernesto's spell is causing Lincoln to fall in love with her, Ronnie Anne ropes Sid into being her wing-girl.
6	6	"Arr in the Family"	Mike Nordstrom	Richard Goodman	Diem Doan	November 16, 2019	105	0.95
6	6	"Finders Weepers"	Miguel Puga	Alejandro Bien-Willner	Isaiah Kim	November 16, 2019	105	0.95
"Arr in the Family": The Casagrandes are planning a family day. C.J. is up for a pirate-dinner show starring Captain Dave as Ronnie Anne plans to get C.J. picked to raise the flag. Though she competes with a boy named Ralphie who also wants to be picked. This leads to a fierce competition which leads to C.J. taking over as captain when Captain Dave is accidentally shot out of a cannon. "Finders Weepers": Ronnie Anne and Sid find a change purse with a $100 bill in it while playing frisbee in the mercado. As Bobby doesn't know anyone who dropped it, he suggests that they place it in the lost and found where none of the tenants own it. They are soon tempted to use the $100 bill where they learn that it was owned by Maybelle. Meanwhile, Bobby starts wearing things from the lost and found to see if anyone recognizes their items where he gets in a dessert-based wager with Carl.
7	7	"Stress Test"	Mike Nordstrom	Isabel Galupo	Chelsea Holt	January 11, 2020	106A	0.64
Carlota and Bobby have gotten their BAT (Big Academic Test) scores in the mail. While Carlota passed hers, Bobby failed due to his test-taking anxieties. Each of the Casagrande family members worked to help Bobby get prepared for the upcoming tests in whatever way possible.
8	8	"Operation Dad"	Miguel Puga	Adeline Colangelo & Whitney Wetta	Raymond Santos & Rebecca Schauer	January 20, 2020	107	1.00
Dr. Arturo Santiago is in town for a conference and has an opportunity to watch over Ronnie Anne and Bobby while Maria is at a spa weekend. Ronnie Anne wants to have her father move in with them. She plans to get him to stay with the Casagrandes with the help of Bobby and her cousins. After every attempt fails, Sid helps her look like a punk with the help of Casey, Nikki, and Sameer.
9	9	"How to Train Your Carl"	Miguel Puga	Rosemary Contreras	David Teas	January 27, 2020	106B	0.68
Ronnie Anne, Sid, C.J., Carl, and Adelaide go to the Great Lakes City Zoo where Stanley and Becca have arranged a sleepover with the rest of the Chang family. During the night tour, Carl wants to see a komodo dragon named Keyon who turns out to be diurnal. He sneaks away from the tour group to try to find Keyon as he is stalked by a night monkey named Nico that wants his beef jerky. When Carl is found not there, Becca goes to look for him as Stanley covers for her.
10	10	"Flee Market"	Mike Nordstrom	Richard Goodman	Diem Doan	January 28, 2020	108A	0.68
Bobby and Lori are having a pizza-versary date tomorrow. While en route to a mercado convention, Hector advises Bobby to have Ronnie Anne, C.J., and Carl run the mercado. When he gets to Royal Woods to meet up with Lori, Bobby worries that they aren't following the procedures of handling the mercado and has to sneak away from Lori to check up on them.
11	11	"Copy Can't"	Miguel Puga	Isabel Galupo	Isaiah Kim	January 29, 2020	108B	0.71
While preparing for a go-kart race with Sid, Ronnie Anne has noticed that Carlitos has copied the other family members and hasn't even copied her doing anything. Ronnie Anne works to win Carlitos over by taking advice from the cousins. It works too well where Carlitos starts sticking to Ronnie Anne for a few days later.
12	12	"Away Game"	Mike Nordstrom	Rosemary Contreras	Chelsea Holt	February 22, 2020	109	0.74
12	12	"Monster Cash"	Miguel Puga	Laura Sreebny	David Teas	February 22, 2020	109	0.74
"Away Game": Arturo has moved into an apartment as Ronnie Anne and Bobby visit him. Worried that they would move into Arturo's apartment after hearing about how good it is while comparing it to a telenovela she saw, Rosa plans to show them that their apartment is better than Arturo while roping Sergio into helping her. "Monster Cash": Margarita mentions about her ghost tour in New Orleans. Hearing about it, Carl plans to start his own ghost tour where he hears about Rosa's legend of El Cucuy. With assistance from Lalo, Sergio, and Stanley, Carl invites Ronnie Anne, Bobby, Adelaide, and Vito to partake in it. Afterwards, Carl, Lalo, and Sergio soon find that the El Cucuy legend appears to be true.
13	13	"Trend Game"	Mike Nordstrom	Alejandro Bien-Willner	Raymond Santos	February 29, 2020	110	0.75
13	13	"This Bird Has Flown"	Miguel Puga	Alec Schwimmer	Rebecca Schauer	February 29, 2020	110	0.75
"Trend Game": Ronnie Anne realizes to her dismay that she's really behind on all of the latest trends that happen in Great Lakes City. In an attempt to catch up, Ronnie Anne enlists Carlota's help and proceeds to take her out on a fun day doing the latest trends. When she talks about her day with Sid, Casey, Sameer and Nikki, they decide to tag along for a fun day. Unfortunately, Carlota is too busy at the moment, forcing Ronnie Anne to improvise. "This Bird Has Flown": Bobby is vying for employee of the month at the mercado, but Sergio keeps ruining things for him. When Sergio wins employee of the month, an enraged Bobby tells him to fly away and never come back. When the family cannot find Sergio anywhere, a guilt-ridden Bobby must find him before his family catches on that he was responsible for him going away.
14	14	"V.I.Peeved"	Mike Nordstrom	Adeline Colangelo	Diem Doan	March 14, 2020	111	0.61
14	14	"Señor Class"	Miguel Puga	Rosemary Contreras	Isaiah Kim	March 14, 2020	111	0.61
"V.I.Peeved": Carlota has won a vlog interview with pop star Alisa Barela (Ally Brooke) who is performing at Great Lakes Stadium as Carlota also works on her makeup. The rest of the family tags along where they do some things that nearly embarrass her. So Carlota works to keep them from interfering with the vlog interview. "Señor Class": Hector enrolls at Cesar Chavez Academy to complete his education when the Mercado kept him from completing his education years ago. He starts doing things that start to affect Ronnie Anne and Carl's school life. Now the two of them work on a plan to get him to drop out. Though the latest attempt to get Hector to enroll backfires when too much stuff is delivered to the Mercado.
15	15	"Fast Feud"	Mike Nordstrom	Richard Goodman	Chelsea Holt	April 28, 2020	112A	0.50
A new burger joint called Burger Blast has opened up across the street where it has kept Ronnie Anne and Sid awake with its arousing smell, bright sign, and loud tip jingle. Not wanting to go through the same thing every night, Ronnie Anne and Sid try to reason with its managers Padma (Anjali Bhimani) and Pierre (James Arnold Taylor). When their registered complaint does not work, Ronnie and Sid work to deal with the shenanigans through whatever way possible.
16	16	"Never Friending Story"	Miguel Puga	Alejandro Bien-Willner	David Teas	April 30, 2020	112B	0.56
Bobby cannot go see a movie on his own. At Ronnie Anne's suggestion, Bobby looks to make friends in Great Lakes City. After attempts to befriend Mrs. Kernicky, Georgia, Mr. Nakamura, his classmate Devon, and Maybelle, Bobby ends up finding a friend in Par who also has a long-distance girlfriend and the same use of a hair product. Though Par's thrill-seeking habits starts to fill Bobby with fear.
17	17	"Slink or Swim"	Miguel Puga	Leah Longoria	Isaiah Kim	May 30, 2020	114	0.61
17	17	"The Big Chill"	Mike Nordstrom	Michael Molina	Diem Doan	May 30, 2020	114	0.61
"Slink or Swim": The Great Lakes City Pool that is down the block from the Casagrande's apartment is open for the season as Hector leads the family to the pool. Carl is reluctant to go in because he doesn't know how to swim and that he had not taken the lessons. As a certified lifeguard, Bobby plans to teach Carl how to swim in exchange that Carl teaches Bobby how to tie his shoes. "The Big Chill": During a heat wave, Ronnie Anne plans to get an air conditioner for their building. Hector states that they cannot afford an air conditioner and states that they will have to earn the money themselves. When a street fair occurs, Bobby leads Ronnie Anne and his cousins into selling Raspados when Hector apparently repaired the machine. After the Raspados Maker breaks down, the kids must find other ways to raise money.
18	18	"Karma Chameleon"	Mike Nordstrom	Rosemary Contreras	Chelsea Holt	June 16, 2020	115A	0.50
The Chang family goes out of town for the weekend and leave the reptiles from the Great Lakes City Zoo's reptile house in the care of the Casagrandes including a chameleon snake named Cam. Due to the fact that Mr. Scully has a "no reptiles rule" as he has a fear of reptiles, Ronnie Anne, Bobby, Carlota, C.J., and Carl have to hide them when he comes by to install the new smoke detectors in the apartment building. When Cam goes missing, they must work to find Cam before Mr. Scully does.
19	19	"Team Effort"	Miguel Puga	Alejandro Bien-Willner	David Teas	June 18, 2020	115B	0.55
At Cesar Chavez Academy, Ronnie Anne, Nikki, Sameer, and Casey start a skateboarding team as Coach Crawford (Jonathan Banks) considers skateboarding to be a nuisance. To live up to the rules and get Coach Crawford to accept the team, Ronnie Anne gets Sid and Laird on the team. When they meet some of the conditions, Coach Crawford states that they must win a qualifying match after school.
20	20	"Grandparent Trap"	Mike Nordstrom	Adeline Colangelo	Raymond Santos	August 10, 2020	113A	0.46
While seeing Frida watch a relationship-mending talk show that is hosted by a woman named Camila (Cristela Alonzo), Ronnie Anne sees signs that Hector and Rosa's marriage is on the rocks. In order to make sure that they do not break up, Ronnie Anne enlists Carlota and C.J. to pull out every trick to keep Hector and Rosa together. When most of them fail with one of them being because of Carl's interference, Ronnie Anne tricks them into getting an appearance on "Camila" to see if she can assist them.
21	21	"Miss Step"	Miguel Puga	Rebeca B. Delgado	Rebecca Schauer	August 11, 2020	113B	0.56
While working on a dress using Carlota as a model, Frida informs Ronnie Anne that they are going to be doing Baile Folklorico that is part of their family tradition. When Lalo accidentally injures Carlota, Ronnie Anne offers to take Carlota's place. Frida puts Ronnie Anne through a rugged training program to perfect her Baile Folklorico skills. Upon Ronnie Anne finding out that Carlota is not hurt, they work on getting out of the event through whatever way possible.
22	22	"Guess Who's Shopping for Dinner?"	Mike Nordstrom	Alec Schwimmer	Raymond Santos	August 12, 2020	116A	0.58
After watching a trailer for the latest Phoebe Powers movie "Bark Night", Ronnie Anne is asked by Rosa to help her shop for ingredients for dinner since Sergio is busy hosting a birthday party for Sancho. In order to get to see "Bark Night", Ronnie Anne works with Rosa to get the ingredients from Hi 'N' Buy. She soon learns that a famous food critic is visiting the Casagrande's apartment and must sacrifice seeing the movie with Sid to get the right ingredients to Rosa before the food critic arrives.
23	23	"New Roomie"	Miguel Puga	Richard Goodman	Rebecca Schauer	August 13, 2020	116B	0.47
At the Casagrande Mercado, Vito visits stating that his apartment is flooded leaving him without a home. Rosa persuades Hector to let Vito, Big Tony, and Little Sal to bunk with them until his apartment is fixed. When they start to overstay their welcome, Ronnie Anne and Bobby plan to find another place for Vito to crash where his antics start to annoy Carlos, Frida, the Changs, Mr. Nakamura, Mrs. Kernicky, and the Flores family.
24	24	"Mexican Makeover"	Miguel Puga	Lalo Alcaraz	Isaiah Kim	September 18, 2020	117	0.43
24	24	"Uptown Funk"	Mike Nordstrom	Rosemary Contreras	Diem Doan	September 18, 2020	117	0.43
"Mexican Makeover": Rosa's mother Lupe (Angélica Aragón) is coming to Great Lakes City to visit the Casagrande family. Knowing that she hasn't upheld the family tradition, Rosa scrambles to get Ronnie Anne, Bobby, Carlota, C.J., and Carl to make sure that they carry on the family traditions like learning Spanish and having Mexican food before Lupe arrives. "Uptown Funk": Stanley offers to take Adelaide on his train ride. To take up the bring a friend option, Carl takes part in Adelaide's tea party, playing princess by kissing Froggy II, and her version of El Falcon del Fuego. Finding herself used when it comes to that event, Adelaide works to catch Froggy II when he is thrown by Carl who is then tempted by the imaginary trains to touch a button.
25	25	"Bo Bo Business"	Miguel Puga	Han-Yee Ling	David Teas	September 25, 2020	118	0.61
25	25	"Blunder Party"	Mike Nordstrom	Michael Molina	Chelsea Holt	September 25, 2020	118	0.61
"Bo Bo Business": Bobby works to improve the mercado which does not sit well with Hector who has run the mercado his way for decades. To prove that his ideas work, Bobby takes a job offer at Hong's where Mr. Hong (Daniel Dae Kim) takes his ideas which starts to work. This goes well until he starts to let people bring their pets to shop with them while Mr. Hong is away at the Great Lakes City Waterpark. "Blunder Party": Ronnie Anne and Sid set up a camp-themed slumber party on the apartment's roof with Casey, Laird, Nikki, and Sameer. Their slumber party gets crashed by Carl and Adelaide. Enlisting Rosa to convince them, Ronnie Anne and Sid allow them to partake in the slumber party until they fall asleep. Carl and Adelaide's antics lead Ronnie and Sid to keep them busy with a scavenger hunt around the apartment building.

=== Season 2 (2020–21) ===
No. overall	No. in season	Title	Directed by	Written by	Storyboarded by	Original release date	Prod. code	U.S. viewers (millions)
26	1	"Fails from the Crypt"	Miguel Puga	Alec Schwimmer	Rebecca Schauer	October 9, 2020	202	0.52
26	1	"Bad Cluck"	Mike Nordstrom	Rosemary Contreras	Raymond Santos	October 9, 2020	202	0.52
"Fails from the Crypt": Sergio rats out to Rosa and Hector that Ronnie Anne is going to spend the night at Great Lakes City Cemetery where the Fearless Four had hung out there at night once. Upon Hector giving in to Ronnie Anne's puppy eyes, Ronnie Anne goes to the Great Lakes City Cemetery with Sid, Nikki, Sameer, Casey, and Laird as they work to survive the night. They are each scared off one by one by things like a skeleton, a giant spider, and a zombie secretly operated by Rosa, Hector, Sergio, and Vito who are secretly defending their title as the original Fearless Four. "Bad Cluck": The Casagrandes' apartment is being haunted by a chicken ghost that is pelting them with eggs, possessed furniture, and kitchen appliances. Due to Hector's texting, some people try their own remedies to get rid of the chicken ghost. First, Mr. Nakamura teaches them a Japanese festival tradition that involves throwing beans at the ghosts which doesn't go well. Then Stanley Chang shows them a way to use snap pops to scare off ghosts only for him to be scared off. Following Arturo's misunderstanding, it is soon discovered that the chicken ghost is Sergio's former rival, Alfredo, who has unfinished business with Sergio. After Sergio makes amends with Alfredo, he leaves at peace but not before a ghost cow comes in with a score to settle with Sergio too.
27	2	"What's Love Gato Do with It?"	Mike Nordstrom	Alec Schwimmer	Diem Doan	October 16, 2020	120	0.55
27	2	"Dial M. for Mustard"	Miguel Puga	Michael Molina	Isaiah Kim	October 16, 2020	120	0.55
"What's Love Gato Do with It?": At Alexis Flores' birthday party, Bobby attends to meet the magician Greta the Great where he is hypnotized into a cat. Due to Bobby being called by Hector, Greta the Great could not finish bringing him out of hypnosis causing a bell to make Bobby act like a cat and the word "papaya" restores him to normal. Now the Casagrandes must work to get Bobby back to normal when Greta the Great is unsuccessful at undoing the hypnosis. "Dial M. for Mustard": While showing off her vertigo trick, Ronnie Anne learns that Bruno is partaking the Great Lakes City hot dog contest where the winner which Arturo is one of the judges and the prize is a trip to Vienna. When Bruno's hot dog cart has gone missing after his afternoon bathroom break, Ronnie Anne, Carl, and C.J. work to solve the mystery by asking the suspects Laird, Maybelle, and Vito. When Hector is the latest suspect, Carl suspects that he eliminated Bruno's hot dog cart to eliminate the competition until they encounter the real culprit in a hot dog suit.
28	3	"Cursed!"	Mike Nordstrom & Miguel Puga	Rosemary Contreras & Alejandro Bien-Willner	Raymond Santos & Rebecca Schauer	November 25, 2020	119	0.52
Rosa announces that Ernesto Estrella is coming to Great Lakes City for a book-signing as she plans to be among the first people there. During the camp out, a message from Ernesto states that Great Lakes City has a cloud of bad luck over it right now and will return when the cloud is gone. Rosa believes this as she works to remove the bad luck curse from their home and not letting anyone leave the apartment. Ronnie Anne enlists Bobby and her cousins to prove to Ernesto that Great Lakes City is not bad luck by making a video of it. Due to Sergio putting too much action in that video and showing it to Rosa, she takes the entire family out of Great Lakes City and Bobby takes up Lori's advice to move in with the Loud Family. To end this nightmare, Ronnie Anne takes Lisa's advice to show her that bad luck can happen anywhere. But when that plan backfires, Rosa decides to have everyone move into the forest knowing they are the source of bad luck.
29	4	"A Very Casagrandes Christmas"	Miguel Puga	Michael Molina & Rebeca B. Delgado	Diem Doan & Isaiah Kim	December 5, 2020	206	0.55
On Christmas, the Casagrandes are preparing for the final night of Las Posadas with Arturo present. As they prepare to sing to their neighbors, they receive visitors from the Chang Family who want dinner with them after Nico and Cam ruined their dinner. They also joined by the Nakamuras, Vito and his dogs, Mrs. Kernicky, the Flores, and Maybelle who join their party for various reasons. All the visitors affect Ronnie Anne and Bobby's Las Posadas plans as Rosa advises them to have sympathy for them. Ronnie Anne and Bobby work to fix everyone's problems. When Arturo gets trapped in the Hi 'n' Buy, Ronnie Anne and Bobby go to check up on him as different mishaps happen.
30	5	"The Kid Plays in the Picture"	Miguel Puga	Alejandro Bien-Willner	George O. Holguin	January 22, 2021	201	0.50
30	5	"Achy Breaky Art"	Mike Nordstrom	Han-Yee Ling	Chelsea Holt	January 22, 2021	201	0.50
"The Kid Plays in the Picture": In light of El Falcon del Fuego's Falcon Fortress being advertised, Carl plans to obtain it when Frida schedules it for his birthday. Inspired by Carlota's videos, Carl does videos where he reviews different toys which don't go well causing him to turn to Carlota for help which leads to get more hits involving Sergio. Toy Citi sends a package and a letter where their impressed with Carl and Sergio's on-screen feud until they are approached by Monica from Super Duper Awesome Toys who has sinister plans for their toy reviews. "Achy Breaky Art": At the Art Space Gallery, the Casagrandes visit their art show where Frida displays her artwork. Romeo introduces Frida to Artemio Alcarez (Jonny Cruz) from the Great Lakes City Chronicles who is known to make and break artists. The next day, Frida finds that Artemio has made negative reviews against it. To avoid Frida from finding out, Ronnie Anne, Bobby, Carlota, C.J., and Carl work to keep Frida from reading Artemio's review. When Frida does read the review, the kids work to sell Frida's art at the art auction at the Art Space Gallery which Artemio is attending while in disguise.
31	6	"Guilt Trip"	Mike Nordstrom	Michael Molina	Diem Doan	January 29, 2021	203	0.45
31	6	"Short Cut"	Miguel Puga	Leah Longoria	Isaiah Kim	January 29, 2021	203	0.45
"Guilt Trip": Maria is ready for a week off after she comes home from the hospital. Looking through her high school yearbook, Ronnie Anne and Bobby see that she was voted "Most likely to see the world" and learn from Rosa stated that she put it aside the day when Ronnie Anne and Bobby were born. They work to win contests to get Maria free trip like the prize wheel at Hong's to get a trip to Korea, eating the Colossal Pizza for a trip to Italy, winning a trip to Japan through a sumo match, and a Great Lakes City dance marathon where the prize for the last person standing is a trip around the world. "Short Cut": After a makeover of Margarita, Carlota is told that she needs to pass the hair-styling contest on her in order to get a certificate to work at the celebrity spa. As her haircut on Carl ends up disastrous, C.J. offers to help Carlota after he fixes Carl's hair. He trains her in cutting hair so that she can practice getting Margarita's hairstyle down. When she does do the hair-styling contest, Margarita wants a new hairstyle which Carlota didn't practice for. This causes C.J. to cover for Carlota who is enticed to take a nap. Afterwards, Carlota is roped into a hair-styling assignment when her assistant is sick and they must work on the bride, the father, and the bridesmaids who are heading to a wedding as C.J. helps her out.
32	7	"Fool's Gold"	Mike Nordstrom	Rosemary Contreras	Raymond Santos	February 5, 2021	205	0.40
32	7	"Flight Plan"	Miguel Puga	Alec Schwimmer	Rebecca Schauer	February 5, 2021	205	0.40
"Fool's Gold": While cleaning the stock room at the Casagrande Mercado, Hector, Carl, C.J. and Carlos find a treasure map made by Pancho Villa that would lead anyone to his treasure. They begin to solve each riddle after another to find the treasure and work to keep the treasure hunt private from everyone else. Due to Hector's accidentally texting the neighborhood, they get some competition from Sergio, Maybelle, Vito, Big Tony, Little Sal, Stanley, Becca, Mr. Scully, Mrs. Kernicky, and Par. "Flight Plan": On their anniversary, Carlos and Frida give each other gifts. On Frida's part, she gets Carlos a P-40 Warhawk for them to ride. While they go out, Mr. Nakamura and Nelson are hidden by Carl, C.J. and Carlitos. When they drive him away, Carlos and Frida enlist Miranda where they drive her away as well. Then Maybelle is called in until Carl tricks her into leaving causing Carlos and Frida to bring them along. While Carlos and Frida go on a P-40 Warhawk, Carl, C.J. and Carlitos unknowingly get onto a self-flying A.I. airplane that takes off with them on it.
33	8	"No Egrets"	Mike Nordstrom	Han-Yee Ling	Chelsea Holt	February 15, 2021	204	0.51
33	8	"Meal Ticket"	Miguel Puga	Alejandro Bien-Willner	Nic Parris	February 15, 2021	204	0.51
"No Egrets": Sergio finds a nest on the roof and goes to sleep on it after returning from a rager with Sancho and the pigeons. The two eggs hatch into black egret chicks which think that Sergio is their mama. Rosa advises Sergio to raise them as she doesn't know where their real mama is. He starts training them in flying, taking a bath, and digging through garbage cans for food. This starts to affect Sergio's time with Sancho and the pigeons. When the baby chicks start to affect Sergio's party by doing things that put themselves in danger, Sergio must take action when they get attacked by the Street Cats. "Meal Ticket": 12 is Midnight is performing in Great Lakes City as Ronnie Anne and Sid plan to obtain the tickets. They are unable to purchase it due to Sergio disabling the internet. Luckily for them, Casey enlists them to work on his father Alberto's Cubano food truck which is serving Cuban food at the concert. After being trained, Ronnie Anne and Sid work to move the truck five yards where Alberto's foot is accidentally injured by Reizuko leaving Casey in charge as Ronnie Anne and Sid struggle to see the concert.
34	9	"An Udder Mess"	Miguel Puga	Rosemary Contreras	Nic Parris	February 16, 2021	207	0.42
34	9	"Teacher's Fret"	Mike Nordstrom	Alejandro Bien-Willner	Chelsea Holt	February 16, 2021	207	0.42
"An Udder Mess": Ronnie Anne wins two VIP tickets to Dairyland from the bottom of a chocolate milk bottle where a new ride called the Chocolate Milk Shaker is being unleashed. Unfortunately, Ronnie Anne is left conflicted when Lincoln and Sid want her to bring them. Taking advice from Abuela, Ronnie Anne sees signs that point to both of them. After failing to get the additional ticket from Vito where it ended up with Bruno, Ronnie Anne is approached by Carl who helps her to sneak Ronnie Anne in to Dairyland disguised as Tippy the Cow when she gives them to Lincoln and Sid. "Teacher's Fret": While at the park with Ronnie Anne, Arturo reveals to her that he started dating. She is shocked to learn that the date in question is her teacher Mrs. Galiano. While bringing it up with Sid, Ronnie Anne claims that it will affect his social life if anyone they know sees them dating. This leaves Ronnie Anne feeling awkward even when Becky watches them making them up. Sid helps Ronnie Anne get through this as they work to break them up though different ways and they still get together. They soon leads them to try to do some miscommunication.
35	10	"I, Breakfast Bot"	Mike Nordstrom	Han-Yee Ling	Raymond Santos	February 17, 2021	208	0.34
35	10	"Dynamic Do-Over"	Miguel Puga	Alec Schwimmer	Rebecca Schauer	February 17, 2021	208	0.34
"I, Breakfast Bot": Rosa instructs Ronnie Anne, Carl, C.J., and Sergio to handle all the chores while she goes to unclog the Flores family's toilet. With Sid's help, they get Breakfast-Bot to help out with the choirs so that they can see the premiere of "Popular Pranks". They start to take advantage of Breakfast-Bot and drain all of its power. Sid works to charge up Breakfast-Bot and upgraded to a new model until he causes a revolution with the appliances and action figures. "Dynamic Do-Over": Carl learns from Bobby that El Falcón del Fuego is doing a comic signing at Ron's Comics. After Carl learns that the El Falcón del Fuego at the comic signing is an actor and is not real, Carl gives up on him causing Bobby to dress up as El Falcón to prove that the superhero is real and enlists the family to help. When the family members posing as El Dragón, La Cobra, and La Tortuga team up, Bobby as El Falcón del Fuego defeats them which convinces Carl until a real criminal robs the Mercado.
36	11	"Home Improvement"	Mike Nordstrom	Michael Molina	Diem Doan	February 18, 2021	209	0.51
36	11	"Undivided Attention"	Miguel Puga	Heidi Lux & Nikki Taguilas	Isaiah Kim	February 18, 2021	209	0.51
"Home Improvement": It is Laird's turn to host movie night and he is weary of it. Ronnie Anne, Sid, Nikki, Sameer, and Casey learn that Laird is embarrassed where he lives. With Arturo on vacation, Laird persuades Ronnie Anne to let her use Arturo's pad to pass off as his house while making it look like his house. Ronnie Anne and Laird work to keep up the charade during movie time where they watch "Evil Hat Man: The Brimming" while dealing with Arturo's return. "Undivided Attention": Carlota starts playing "Fashion Safari" much to the annoyance of her family members due to her getting distracted collecting the game's items for the $500.00 shopping spree prize. Carlos enlists one of his students to tutor her for an upcoming test as she suspects that she is on her date. She meets a Lakota-descent boy named Charles Little Bull (Robbie Daymond) at the Great Lakes City Library who begins to tutor her while still thinking that she wants to date him. After the comical tutoring at the Great Lakes City Library, Carlota works to get rid of him so that she can complete the game against Carl in "Fashion Safari".
37	12	"Karate Chops"	Mike Nordstrom	Han-Yee Ling	Chelsea Holt	March 26, 2021	210	0.45
37	12	"Taco the Town"	Miguel Puga	Alejandro Bien-Willner	Nic Parris	March 26, 2021	210	0.45
"Karate Chops": At Par's Dojo, Carl has been the top of his class. Par announces that Adelaide has joined their dojo as Carl is instructed to show her the ropes. Jealous of Adelaide's performance, Carl plans to get Adelaide out of his karate class with Sergio's help by challenging her to a board-breaking class where the loser leaves the karate class forever. Afterwards, Carl must partake in a board-breaking event at Cesar Chavez Academy so that Par can get more students for his dojo. "Taco the Town": Rosa has made her red tacos which gives Hector an idea to sell them. He persuades Rosa to make the tacos which will make them money which he shares with his customers. They start to become a hit at the mercado. Rosa starts a taco cart with Lalo with Carl assuming the alias of DJ Tacotron. With Rosa busy and the red tacos becoming more popular than the mercado, Hector is left to handle her building manager, helping out C.J., and cleaning the apartment.
38	13	"Zoo-mergency!"	Mike Nordstrom & Miguel Puga	Han-Yee Ling & Alec Schwimmer	Carmen Liang, Rebecca Schauer, & David Shair	May 31, 2021	214	0.32
Becca reveals to her family that the Great Lakes City Zoo is closing next week due to the loss of money and the animals will be sold to different zoos. At the advice of some of the animals with them, Sid suggests that they do a fundraiser to save the Great Lakes City Zoo. After the fundraiser fails, Sid comes up with various ideas that keep backfiring which leaves Becca and Stanley weary. Meanwhile, Adelaide works to keep Marcel's marmoset family from being separated by breaking them out while avoiding getting caught in the act by the zoo's security guard Paul.
39	14	"Saving Face"	Mike Nordstrom	Rosemary Contreras	Carmen Liang	June 4, 2021	211	0.38
39	14	"Matters of the Kart"	Miguel Puga	Alec Schwimmer	Rebecca Schauer	June 4, 2021	211	0.38
"Saving Face": After Ronnie Anne, C.J., and Carl watch a wrestling match between La Tormenta (Stephanie Beatriz) and Tigress, Carlos states that he has gotten tickets for them and they can take Sid along. They meet a temporary tenant named Blanca Guzman where they suspect that she is La Tormenta. To confirm their suspicions, Ronnie and Sid plan to search her apartment for the La Tormenta mask where they find a secret compartment with the La Tormenta costume where they accidentally lose her mask. Frida makes a new mask which affects her upcoming match as Ronnie Anne and Sid work to find the real mask. "Matters of the Kart": The local pizza restaurant is holding a go-kart giveaway which Carl hopes to win a go-kart that runs on pizza. When it comes to the drawing of the number which Sergio tries to rig, a ball stating #8 is drawn enabling an old man named Irving to win. He plans to find a deserving young person to give the go-kart to. Carl and Sergio plan to appease Irving so that he can give the go-kart to them. After saving Irving from pigeons who were secretly hired by Sergio, Carl gets the go-kart. Rosa invites him to dinner as Carl notes that anyone who knows him might rat out the fact that Carl is not a good person.
40	15	"Chancla Force"	Miguel Puga	Story by : Miguel Puga; Written by : Lalo Alcaraz	Isaiah Kim	June 11, 2021	212	0.35
40	15	"Fluff Love"	Mike Nordstrom	Michael Molina	Robert Moon	June 11, 2021	212	0.35
"Chancla Force": While Carlos and Frida are at Burning Flan festival and Ronnie Anne and Bobby at Arturo's place for the weekend, Rosa and Hector are left to watch over Carl, C.J., and Carlitos as Rosa uses her Chancla to interrupt their activities. To avoid having their fun disrupted, Carl leads C.J., Carlitos, Lalo, and Sergio into stealing Rosa's chanclas. When that happens, the other family members are pleased until they cause Rosa to neglect her duties. Now, Carl must get the chanclas back to Rosa before things get worse. "Fluff Love": At Joe's Arcade, Carlitos wants to obtain the stuffed penguin, Mr. Fluff, from the claw machine. Depressed at the fact that the claw machine are rigged, Carlitos starts to see Mr. Fluff interacting with him as he sneaks out in disguise to return to the arcade using Laird's skateboard, while Lalo wakes up and finds out he snuck out. Once he's back at the arcade, Carlitos gets into the claw machine where both him and Mr. Fluff get claimed by Vito so that Big Tony and Little Sal can have chew toys. As Lalo drags Carlos into finding him, Carlitos must find a way to keep Mr. Fluff out of danger.
41	16	"Battle of the Grandpas"	Miguel Puga	Rosemary Contreras	Nic Parris	June 18, 2021	213	0.46
41	16	"Prankaversary"	Mike Nordstrom	Adeline Colangelo	Susan Nguyen	June 18, 2021	213	0.46
"Battle of the Grandpas": Frida's fun-loving dad and movie stuntman Danny (Danny Trejo) comes to Great Lakes City to visit Frida and meets Ronnie Anne and Bobby. This causes a rivalry with Hector who is destined to prove that he is the awesome grandfather where he tries to cook and perform music. After Hector sent Danny on the express train, the competition gets intense as Hector tries to beat Danny at everything. "Prankaversary": Ronnie Anne is preparing for a Prankaversary which starts when Lincoln comes to visit from Royal Woods to have a prank war. Sid wants to take part even though she is not familiar with the classic pranks. Ronnie Anne makes Sid her helper by the time Lincoln arrives as her attempt to help keeps causing Ronnie Anne's pranks to backfire. Sid plans to pull off the better prank to outdo them leads to her accidentally getting swallowed by Igor the Snake.
42	17	"Do the Fruit Shake"	Miguel Puga	Michael Molina	Rebecca Schauer	June 25, 2021	217A	0.50
Carl digs through Carlos' vintage records for the block party that he is working as a DJ at so that he can remix it. When he finds a record from the 70's group Tropical Fruits and plays the song "Do the Fruit Shake" at the block party, he is approached by record company owner Larry Funkman who will broadcast it if he has gotten their approval. Carl, C.J., Lalo, and Sergio look for the members of the Piña, Papaya, and Mango in order to get their approval. Despite getting Piño and Papaya's approval, Carl looks for the elusive Mango who turns out to be someone he'd least suspect....Maybelle.
43	18	"Maybe-Sitter"	Miguel Puga	Han-Yee Ling	Nic Parris	June 25, 2021	216B	0.50
Rosa, Hector, Carlos, and Frida are going to the unveiling of the new history building. Due to Mr. Nakamura having to cancel due to a sprained toe, Rosa has Bobby and Carlota are ordered to watch over the kids despite their claims that they will miss Par's "Live to the Extreme" birthday party. Bobby and Carlota take turns watching the kids so that Bobby can be their for Par and Carlota can avoid having her subscribers stolen by her rival Cindy Tran. C.J., Carl, Carlitos, Lalo, and Sergio take advantage of their rotating schedule.
44	19	"Operation Popstar"	Mike Nordstrom & Miguel Puga	Rebeca B. Delgado & Han-Yee Ling	Susan Nguyen, Nic Parris & David Shair	July 16, 2021	219	0.34
The Great Lakes City Music Festival is occurring where 12 is Midnight and Alisa Barela are performing. While Carlota has been hired to help Alisa with her makeup at her hotel, she learns from Alisa misses being home as Carlota invites her to come over to dine with her family. In addition, Ronnie Anne and Sid work to find a way to get Yoon Kwan's autograph on the day of the Great Lakes City Music Festival where they find that they are staying in the same hotel. Things start to go awry when Alisa plans to resign from the music business and Ronnie Anne and Sid accidentally fall on Yoon Kwan enough to give him amnesia. Now Carlota, Ronnie Anne, and Sid must fix their predicament before the Great Lakes City Music Festival begins.
45	20	"Lalo Land"	Mike Nordstorm	Rosemary Contreras	Susan Nguyen	July 20, 2021 (Nicktoons); December 10, 2021 (Nickelodeon)	216A	0.29
At the park, Ronnie Anne, Carl, and C.J. learn from Mr. Nakamura that Phoebe Powers is shooting her next movie in Great Lakes City and is holding an audition for a dog to portray her sidekick. They work to get Lalo in the right shape and condition to pass the audition. Once that is done, Lalo barely passes due to it resembling the dog on the poster. As C.J. and Carl take advtange of the movie set life, Lalo experiences the difficulty of acting as Sergio tries to bond with the director.
46	21	"Just Be Coo"	Mike Nordstrom	Michael Molina	Robert Moon	September 10, 2021	215	0.33
46	21	"Tee'd Off"	Miguel Puga	Alejandro Bien-Willner	Isaiah Kim	September 10, 2021	215	0.33
"Just Be Coo": At the park, Sancho holds a pigeon party for his fellow birds that Sergio attends. The next day, Sancho comes to the Casagrandes' apartment where he needs sanctuary from an animal control officer named Marcus (who Ronnie Anne previously encountered in "Walk Don't Run") after Jim Sparkletooth reports on a statue getting pooped on. Sergio works to keep him hidden from the family. When it all fails and Sancho is detained, Sergio must overcome his guilt and rescue Sancho with Lalo and Ronnie Anne's help as they uncover the truth about the statue. "Tee'd Off": Bobby gets his cleaning done with the family so that he can visit Lori at Fairway University. When he finds that Carl and Sergio unintentionally stowed away to get out of their chores, Bobby also finds Lori with a classmate named Ewan (Will Choi) who has been helping Lori with her golfing. Upon getting jealous with Lori's work with Ewan, Bobby is persuaded by Carl to make Ewan look like a chump. This leads to Bobby challenging Ewan to golf as Carl plans to make sure Ewan loses the golf game for the first time.

=== Season 3 (2021–22) ===
No. overall	No. in season	Title	Directed by	Written by	Storyboarded by	Original release date	Prod. code	U.S. viewers (millions)
47	1	"Bend It Like Abuelo"	Mike Nordstrom	Lalo Alcaraz	Robert Moon & David Shair	September 17, 2021	301	0.41
47	1	"Bunstoppable"	Miguel Puga	Han-Yee Ling	Isaiah Kim	September 17, 2021	301	0.41
"Bend It Like Abuelo": Hector is a big fan of the Gatos soccer team where they have not won the Crosslake Championship. Picosito (Efren Ramirez) and the Gatos visit the mercado to do some shopping for Chicaronis. When they finally win a game, Hector suspects that Picosito rubbing his head gave them good luck. He sneaks into the game as the mascot Mr. Gato in order to pull it off. It works until it runs out and Hector enlists Rosa for help to reignite it. "Bunstoppable": Stanley Chang tells Sid and Adelaide of the story when his ancestor gave the Han Family Bandits the bao recipe to keep Clear Water Village safe. Now Stanley wants Sid and Adelaide to make the bao for the Chinese Culture Fair as he trains them in making them. While Stanley goes to snag the best spot in the park, Sid and Adelaide work to make 800 bao where an accident with Breakfast Bot brings the Han Family Bandits members Hui, Woo, and Yi forward in time due to a time rift opening. Sid, Adelaide, and Breakfast Bot must work to perfect the bao before the Han Family Bandits take over Great Lakes City.
48	2	"Spin Off"	Mike Nordstrom	Alejandro Bien-Willner	Robert Moon	September 24, 2021	218	0.28
48	2	"Tooth or Consequences"	Miguel Puga	Rosemary Contreras	Isaiah Kim	September 24, 2021	218	0.28
"Spin Off": C.J. has been doing sign-spinning at the Casagrande mercado. Inspired by C.J.'s skills, Par suggests that C.J. should enter the Great Lakes City Sign-Spinning Competition hosted by Jim Sparkletooth and Mrs. Kernicky. When C.J. doesn't want to compete as he doesn't like competing, Par offers to become his coach in order to prepare for the contest and come up with a finishing move. When it comes to the competition, C.J. makes it to the finals where he competes against Doyle (Vico Ortiz) representing Pete's Pet Shop. "Tooth or Consequences": While drawing pictures with Carl, Adelaide's wiggly tooth comes out. Carl tells Adelaide about a fancy tooth fairy mouse called El Raton who is big in Mexico and Latin America. As Adelaide and Froggy 2 find that El Raton didn't show up, Bobby revealed that he mistook El Raton for a troublesome mouse and drove him away. Carl enlists Bobby into getting El Raton to return with comical results. When all the plans fail, Carl and Bobby try other plans like getting a replacement mouse to pose as El Raton or posing as El Raton in order to please Adelaide.
49	3	"Strife Coach"	Mike Nordstrom	Alec Schwimmer	Carmen Liang	October 1, 2021	220	0.25
49	3	"Gossipy Girl"	Miguel Puga	Michael Molina	Rebecca Schauer	October 1, 2021	220	0.25
"Strife Coach": In light of Coach Crawford's retirement, Cesar Chavez Academy is in need of a new gym teacher. Upon seeing how Rosa, Hector, and Vito are taking it nice and easy during Mrs. Kernicky's yoga class, Ronnie Anne, Sid, Nikki, Sameer, Casey, and Laird persuade Mrs. Kernicky to apply for the job. When she gets the job from Principal Valenzuela, Mrs. Kernicky starts to be displeased with the performance of the students and persuades Principal Valenzuela to make everything healthy much to the dismay of Ronnie Anne's group. "Gossipy Girl": During a game of truth and dare, Ronnie Anne's secret of the dream of marrying fellow student Artemis is leaked. She suspects that one of her friends leaked the information. Soon, the other embarrassing secrets get leaked by an unknown caller like Casey being the Mystery Stinker, Sameer wearing lifts in his shoes to make him taller, Nikki being afraid of sock puppets, and Laird picking his nose with his feet. With Sid being a suspect, she claims that she didn't do it until Ronnie Anne figures out that the least worthy suspect is responsible.
50	4	"Squawk in the Name of Love"	Mike Nordstorm	Alejandro Bien-Willner	Susan Nguyen	October 8, 2021	302	0.34
50	4	"Date with Destiny"	Miguel Puga	Rosemary Contreras	Nic Parris	October 8, 2021	302	0.34
"Squawk in the Name of Love": Priscilla the Ostrich dumps Sergio again. As he failed at finding a new girlfriend as none of them matched up to her, Adelaide finds out that Sergio hasn't treated her like a princess as she offers to help him treat her like royalty. He does attempts like singing her a nice song about her, making a delicious picnic, and giving her a bouquet. After Adelaide helps him with a poem, Sergio is expected to meet with Priscilla's parents, Frank and Estelle. "Date with Destiny": Rosa sees Ernesto Estrella's latest episode as he talks about the water sign. As Maria is a water sign, Rosa believes the prediction that Maria and Arturo get back together. This causes Ronnie Anne and Bobby to plan to see if the prediction will officially come true. With Ronnie Anne getting his mom to the pier with her trapped in Frida's plot and Bobby causes Arturo to cancel his flight. Once they are at the pier, Ronnie Anne and Bobby work to make sure that the date goes off without a hitch.
51	5	"Curse of the Candy Goblin"	Mike Nordstrom & Miguel Puga	Alec Schwimmer & Michael Molina	Carmen Liang & Rebecca Schauer	October 15, 2021	303	0.36
On Halloween, Ronnie Anne, Bobby, C.J., Carl, and Carlota prepare for trick or treating as Carl compete with Ronnie Anne for the most candy as the rest of the children where the winner will win everyone elses obtained candy. After trick or treating around the apartment and around the neighborhood, they arrive outside a haunted house where a warning states that they must take one or else the Candy Goblin will come after them. They don't heed the warning and find themselves stalked by the Candy Goblin (Jim Conroy) even when he makes off with Carlitos. Meanwhile, Hector puts together a haunted maze in the mercado with the rest of the Casagrande adults which Laird, Vito, and Maybelle go through.
52	6	"Throwing Pains"	Mike Nordstrom	Alec Schwimmer	Carmen Liang	December 10, 2021	217B	0.29
On a snowy day, it is too cold for Ronnie Anne, Sid, Nikki, Sameer, Casey, and Laird to skate. They decide to go to Cesar Chavez Academy's gymnasium to do some skating until they find Dodge and her friends playing dodgeball. In order to get Dodge to share the gymnasium, Ronnie Anne's friends challenge them to a game of dodgeball as they begin their training method. After the training, Ronnie Anne's group faces off against Dodge's group in a game of dodgeball until one of Dodge's players gets injured and Dodge calls in a substitute in the form of her girlfriend....Becky.
53	7	"Skaters Gonna Hate"	Miguel Puga	Jess Pineda	Isaiah Kim	January 14, 2022	304	0.34
53	7	"Born to be Mild"	Mike Nordstrom	Han-Yee Ling	Robert Moon	January 14, 2022	304	0.34
"Skaters Gonna Hate": Ronnie Anne shows off her latest skateboarding moves to Sid, Nikki, Sameer, Casey, and Laird where they inform Carlos that they are in the GLC Skate-Off competition where they go up against a skateboarding team led by Tony Hawk. Carlos recalls his time as Carlos X who stole his skateboarding breakout by pushing him as he decides to coach Ronnie Anne's team to get some payback on him. After using Sergio to recon Tony Hawk's team, Carlos X plans to have Ronnie Anne's team become more extreme in the competition. "Born to be Mild": At Cesar Chavez Academy, Carl finds Julio and Becky's twin brother Ricky (Matthew Moy) picking on Alexis where they dump stuff in his tuba. Inspired by the image of El Falcon del Fuego, Carl decides to help Alexis get tough enough to stand up to them. They get off to a rough start, but Alexis pulls through Carl's training. When it comes to the next day at Cesar Chavez Academy and the spreading of Carl's rumors, Alexis stands up to Julio and Ricky where they order him to meet them at the bike rack causing Carl to enlist Lalo and Sergio to back Alexis up.
54	8	"The Bros in the Band"	Mike Nordstrom	Rebeca Delgado	Susan Nguyen	January 21, 2022	305	0.34
54	8	"For the Record"	Miguel Puga	Alejandro Bien-Willner	Nic Parris	January 21, 2022	305	0.34
"The Bros in the Band": Bobby is doing his usual Mercado duties when Par is impressed with his singing. He states that his punk rock band called The GLC Chupacabras is in need of a new singer. Bobby meets Par's bandmates Devon (Arnie Pantoja) and Henrique (Harvey Guillén) at Ziggy's Records & More owned by Ziggy (Jesse Corti). As Par goes to deliver mangos to Maybelle, Bobby has a hard time fitting in with Devon and Henrique who mock him for Hector's song and his romance with Lori. This causes him to turn to Ronnie Anne and Carlota on how to act punk rock before the performance. "For the Record": As everyone else has broken a certain record, Sameer has lacked a record and looks up some record-breaking information. He gets some help from Becky as he does things like getting hit by the most dodgeballs in 10 seconds, staying in a box for an hour with 1,000 fire ants, playing the most instruments at the same time, the longest time hanging upside down while being tickled, and having the most clothespins on a human body until they find a record for skateboarding while blowing bubbles. He works to break the record that Wheels McBubbly held which starts to become difficult for him.
55	9	"15 Candles"	Mike Nordstrom	Alec Schwimmer	Carmen Liang	January 28, 2022	306	0.38
55	9	"Rook, Line and Sinker"	Miguel Puga	Alec Schwimmer	Rebecca Schauer	January 28, 2022	306	0.38
"15 Candles": Ronnie Anne and Rosa are having a girls' day out as Rosa has Ronnie Anne makes plans for Ronnie Anne's upcoming Quinceañera. Rosa plans to work every Saturday to prepare for Ronnie Anne's party and avoid a repeat of Frida's plans for Carlota's party. As Rosa goes overboard with the planning, Ronnie Anne and Sid work to thwart Rosa's plans. Ronnie Anne thinks that Rosa's planning is going too far until she learns the truth from Maria. "Rook, Line and Sinker": Principal Valenzuela calls Carlos and Frida to Cesar Chavez Academy to inform them that Carl has been caught tricking people out of their pudding snacks. As Carlos and Frida plan to set Carl straight, they plan to find a new hobby for him. After failing with an ant farm and a Moon landing re-enactment action figure set, Carlos gets Carl into a game of chess and starts to become a natural. He starts to beat everyone at chess until he starts to use his chess mode to get through different things which starts to annoy Carlos, Frida, and Principal Valenzuela.
56	10	"Let's Get Ready to Rumba"	Mike Nordstrom	Han-Yee Ling	Susan Nguyen	February 4, 2022	308	0.29
56	10	"Perro Malo"	Miguel Puga	Alejandro Bien-Willner	Nic Parris	February 4, 2022	308	0.29
"Let's Get Ready to Rumba": After doing some repairs, Rosa attends ballroom dance class with Mrs. Kernicky, Mrs. Flores, Maybelle, Mr. Nakamura, and Mr. Scully at a new dance studio called Odori Dance. She wants to bring Hector to class in order to take lessons only for him to decline due to him wanting to watch the football game with Sergio, Vito, and Bruno. She meets the instructor Ivan who knows how to move which starts to make Hector jealous as Sergio, Vito, and Bruno predicted. "Perro Malo": Lalo is wanting for a walk, but the Casagrandes are too busy watching the latest episode of "Adios Ana, Adios". Ronnie Anne takes Lalo for a walk in the park where he chases a squirrel while Ronnie Anne is distracted. A confusion occurs where Lalo is mistaken for Becky's vicious look-alike Malo causing Ronnie Anne and Becky to take the wrong dog home. Malo starts causing havoc for the Casagrandes while Lalo starts giving Becky problems of her own with his kindness.
57	11	"Don't Zoo That"	Mike Nordstrom	Leah Longoria	Carmen Liang	February 11, 2022	309	0.37
57	11	"Maxed Out"	Miguel Puga	Rosemary Contreras	Rebecca Schauer	February 11, 2022	309	0.37
"Don't Zoo That": At the Great Lakes City Zoo, Adelaide is planning to obtain her Junior Zookeeper title and name the baby of Penny the Giant Panda. Becca is overseeing the event as C.J. and Carl also take part in the event where Becca advises them to work in a team. Adelaide competes with Carl to earn four badges as C.J. secretly gets them to work together like cleaning Glen the Alligator's teeth, making food for the porcupine foodies Spike and Prickly Pete, tending first aid to Gregor the Giraffe, and doing habitat maintenance for new arrival Lois the Galápagos Tortoise and keep her from getting out. "Maxed Out": At the Casagrande Mercado, Vito has a second breakfast with Hector. When Vito runs up a tab of $10,000.00, Hector has Vito pay his tab. Due to Vito having no payment, Hector has Vito, Big Tony, and Little Sal cover for Bobby while he is studying for his math test. Hector works to train Vito as he starts doing every duty with comical results. After failing at every job, Hector tells Vito not to return until he has paid off his tab. Hector enjoys the time alone as he starts to go insane without Vito around until Bruno informs him that Vito is working as a window washer to pay off the tab.
58	12	"Skatey Cat"	Mike Nordstrom	Alec Schwimmer	Robert Moon & Jaylen Tate-Lucas	February 18, 2022	310A	0.31
Ronnie Anne is doing some skateboarding at the skate park when she has an unexpected wipeout when trying to pull off a 10-80. Following that experience, Ronnie Anne has become weary on skateboarding which becomes a problem for her in front of Sid, Nikki, Sameer, Casey, and Laird. This was shown to Lincoln by Sergio during her chat with her. While Lincoln advises Ronnie Anne to face her fears, Ronnie Anne tries to avoid skateboarding by doing other activities.
59	13	"Weather Beaten"	Miguel Puga	Story by : Miguel Puga; Written by : Lalo Alcaraz	Isaiah Kim	February 25, 2022	310B	0.38
The art gallery at Great Lakes City University is visited by Carlos, Ronnie Anne, C.J., Carl, and Carlitos where Charles Little Bull is helping with the Aztecs exhibit. One of the artifacts is a statue of Tlāloc: God of Rain. Carlos doesn't want C.J. and Carl to touch it or else. Due to Carlitos accidentally knocking the Tlāloc statue into his carriage causing Charles to mistook one of the souvenirs as the statue, the kids learn that the statue actually works. They use its abilities to their fun until the weather goes out of control.
60	14	"The Golden Curse"	Mike Nordstrom & Miguel Puga	Michael Molina & Adeline Colangelo	Robert Moon & Isaiah Kim	June 3, 2022	307	0.25
Mama Lupe and her pet parrot, Paco (Sergio Aragonés), come to Great Lakes City where Paco is going to be married to a deformed female pigeon named Paulina. After persuading Paco to let him be the best man, Sergio receives the las arras to give to Paco. Sergio, Paco, Hector, Bobby, C.J., Carl, Stanley, Sancho and Vito have a bachelor party at the Great Lakes City Zoo, a pizza party at the pizza restaurant, games at Joe's arcade and an underground dance party in the G.L.A.R.T. When it comes to the next morning, Sergio finds that the las arras are missing and he ropes Ronnie Anne, C.J., Carl, and Sancho into finding the las arras while the rest of the Casagrandes keep Paco distracted.
61	15	"Race Against the Machine"	Mike Nordstrom	Michael Molina	Susan Nguyen & Jaylen Tate-Lucas	June 10, 2022	311	0.32
61	15	"My Fair Cat Lady"	Miguel Puga	Han-Yee Ling	Nic Parris	June 10, 2022	311	0.32
"Race Against the Machine": As Ronnie Anne, Sid, Carl, and Adelaide ride on the subway, Stanley is introduced to the robot conductor G.L.A.R.T.-E by his boss Mr. Vanderspeed (Sean Schemmel). Having overheard Mr. Vanderspeed's plot to replace all the human conductors due to him being displeased with delays and conductors stopping for bathroom breaks, the kids inform Stanley of this as they work with him to make his train faster than G.L.A.R.T.-E's train. While Ronnie Anne, Sid, and Breakfast-Bot help out Stanley, Carl and Adelaide pull out every trick to stall G.L.A.R.T.-E. "My Fair Cat Lady": Adelaide witnesses Mr. Scully getting attacked by the cat clowder who has called animal control to deal with them. Not wanting them to serve a lifetime behind bars, Adelaide entices their leader Mr. Wiggles with anchovies so that they can get adopted. She works to teach the cats good manners, being cute, and being obedient to their owners. After the adoption fails, Adelaide works to hide the cats from Marcus at the Great Lakes City Zoo. Though things get complicated when a rat problem happens in Great Lakes City.
62	16	"Survival of the Unfittest"	Mike Nordstrom	Alejandro Bien-Willner	Carmen Liang	June 17, 2022	312	N/A
62	16	"Nixed Signals"	Miguel Puga	Adeline Colangelo	Rebecca Schauer	June 17, 2022	312	N/A
"Survival of the Unfittest": Bobby and Arturo have a movie marathon until the power goes out and Bobby tries to get food on his own. Having seen Bobby in this state, Arturo plans to help Bobby with his survival skills by taking him on a weekend camping trip. Arturo teaches Bobby different survival skills like going to the bathroom behind a tree, setting up a pop-up tent, navigating, setting up an animal trap, and fishing. When it comes to the next day, Bobby gets lost trying to find food and Arturo has to work to rescue him from a bald eagle. "Nixed Signals": Carlota announces on her vlog that she is planning a mother-daughter day and asks for suggestion. Frida also asks Carlos for what to wear for her day with Carlota. While Carlos watches over C.J., Carl, and Carlitos, Frida takes Carlota out on the town where she gives her followers a sneak peek of Frida's work at The Art Space, takes their suggestion on what to order at Goddess Green, and the recommended hairstyle at Margarita's. As Carlota gives her phone to Frida, they go to a spa called Ahh, That Feels Good! until she gets a call from Romeo about his work doing well and that Jim Sparkletooth wants to do an online interview with her.
63	17	"Ay Fidelity"	Mike Nordstrom	Alec Schwimmer	Robert Moon	June 24, 2022	313	0.29
63	17	"Cut the Chisme"	Miguel Puga	Nikki Taguilas & Heidi Lux	Isaiah Kim	June 24, 2022	313	0.29
"Ay Fidelity": At Ziggy's Records & More, Bobby and Par show their appreciation in the merchandise sold here. Upon being told by Ziggy that he has to go out of town to pick up a Mick Swagger record from Royal Woods, he lets Bobby and Par watch over the stuff in order to get an employee discout in exchange for not messing with the store's stuff. They watch over the stuff with comical results involving Vito, Becky, Carl, and Sergio. When they close the store to protect the merchandises, Bobby and Par get tempted by the different merchandise. "Cut the Chisme": Hector gives Vito his order while exchanging gossip with each other where his gossip has displeased Rosa, Miranda, and Mr. Nakamura. The Casagrandes hold an intervention about his chisme addiction. As Hector tries to keep himself from gossiping, the kids work to keep Hector from spreading gossip even when Margarita enters. Sergio is later called in to spray Hector whenever he tries to tell a gossip. When that fails, Greta the Great is hired to hypnotize Hector not to gossip which causes him to become too itchy to spread gossip while being unable to warn his family about different things.
64	18	"Phantom Freakout"	Miguel Puga & Mike Nordstrom	Han-Yee Ling & Rebeca Delgado	Carmen Liang & Rebecca Schauer	July 1, 2022	318	0.35
12 is Midnight is holding a contest to be in their next video which is won by Ronnie Anne and Sid. The music video is at the old Great Lakes City Concert Hall where Ronnie Anne and Sid are told by the director to portray fangirls. When the music video is being filmed, it is disrupted by strange paranormal activities. Lincoln and Clyde are in town with Clyde's dads where they help Ronnie Anne and Sid deal with a Category 3 Poltergeist in the form of the composer Narciso Grillo, who founded the Great Lakes City Concert Hall and dislikes non-classical musical.
65	19	"Sidekickin' Chicken"	Mike Nordstrom	Michael Molina	Susan Nguyen & Jaylen Tate-Lucas	July 8, 2022	314	0.30
65	19	"Silent Fight"	Miguel Puga	Han-Yee Ling	Nic Parris	July 8, 2022	314	0.30
"Sidekickin' Chicken": While watching an episode of El Falcon del Fuego, Carl hears about a contest about making a sidekick who will be added to the TV show. Carl enlists Sergio to film his El Pollito appearance. Frida is enlisted by Carl to make a better El Pollito costume as he and Sergio film it in action as Carl competes against Alexis as Tuba Boy and Adelaide as Pandalaide. When he is eliminated due to El Pollito not being a convincing sidekick, Carl works to do heroic actions to convince them wrong. "Silent Fight": Carlos and Frida tend to a crying Carlitos who has a cold which is keeping them up. They also must keep Carl and CJ from fighting over Carl's El Falcon del Fuego action figure as Frida threatens them not to wake up Carlitos or they will be grounded for two months. After Carlos, Frida, and Carlitos fall asleep, Carl and CJ do their feuds as quietly as they can. When Carlitos is accidentally awoken, they must work together to put Carlitos back to sleep before their parents wake up.
66	20	"Kick Some Bot"	Mike Nordstrom	Alejandro Bien-Willner	Carmen Liang	July 15, 2022	315	0.23
66	20	"Salvador Doggy"	Miguel Puga	Michael Rodriguez	Rebecca Schauer	July 15, 2022	315	0.23
"Kick Some Bot": Adelaide has more awards on the Shelf of Achievement. To do something big for Becca to be proud of her, Sid is told by Ronnie Anne about a Robotics Competition coming to Great Lakes City. While Becca deals with Nico's antics, Sid discovers that Vito and Robbie, Maybelle and Mangobot, Rachel, and Ryan are the competition for her and Breakfast Bot. She is also discovered that Lisa Loud is also competing with her robot Todd. The Robotic Competition is fierce until only Sid and Lisa are left. "Salvador Doggy": Frida is suffering from painter's block as she works on her next upcoming showcase. Lalo rolls into the paint sending some of it onto Frida's canvas. When Romeo comes over, he sees the painting and is impressed where he informs her that there is an art collector coming tomorrow as Frida tries to explain to him. With Romeo in need of 10 more paintings like that, Frida ropes Lalo into making more papers. Sergio becomes Lalo's manager by teaching him the law of supply and demand, where he orders Frida to give Lalo anything in exchange for the paintings.
67	21	"The Wurst Job"	Mike Nordstrom	Alec Schwimmer	Robert Moon	July 29, 2022	316	0.14
67	21	"The Sound of Meddle"	Miguel Puga	Michael Molina	Isaiah Kim	July 29, 2022	316	0.14
"The Wurst Job": Mrs. Galiano announces the Internship Week where the students get to intern with people to learn about the education. Ronnie Anne talks Bruno into letting her intern at his cart to help him out for the upcoming hot dog eating contest. Starting at 6:00 AM, Ronnie Annie learns about the different perks of being a hot dog vendor like beating the other vendors to the good spot in the park, studying up on the menu of the other 50 hot dogs, and handling the lunch rush. When it comes to preparing for the hot dog eating contest by arriving at 5:00 AM, Ronnie Anne comes up with a plan to get out of it. "The Sound of Meddle": Carl is having a gig at Cesar Chavez Academy which only Alexis turned up to. He tells Carl that the Chavez Academy junior band is going to perform at the halftime show of the Gatos soccer game. As Carl has to be in the junior band to be on the field, he works to find an instrument so that he can join the junior band and do his DJ band. Alexis tries to find an instrument for Carl to play. Carl struggles to try out each instrument until he tries out the triangle. When it comes to the day of the Gatos soccer team, Carl sends Sergio to the control booth to await the signal with comical results.
68	22	"Alpaca Lies"	Mike Nordstrom	Heidi Lux & Nikki Taguilas	Susan Nguyen & Jaylen Tate-Lucas	August 5, 2022	317	0.18
68	22	"Rocket Plan"	Miguel Puga	Alejandro Bien-Willner	Nic Parris	August 5, 2022	317	0.18
"Alpaca Lies": At Arturo's apartment, Arturo informs Ronnie Anne and Bobby that his favorite alpaca Beto is coming to visit from Peru. When Arturo meets up with Beto and introduces him to Bobby and Ronnie Anne, he brings Beto to his apartment. Though Beto starts to show some jealousy towards Bobby and Ronnie Anne and Arturo doesn't believe him. Bobby and Ronnie Anne work to expose Beto's actions to Arturo before things get worse. "Rocket Plan": Hector learns from CJ that his fellow students laughed at his plan to send a rocket into outer space like the rocket that was ridden by José M. Hernández. Hector offers to help him with his rocket science project. After they build it, Hector and CJ work to find a way to launch it into outer space like using the soda and mint combination, Lalo's farting, and using Mr. Inflatable to harness the wind. When every attempt fails, Hector has no choice but to buy a rocket and disguise it at CJ's rocket.
69	23	"The Oddfather"	Mike Nordstrom	Michael Molina	Robert Moon	September 23, 2022	319	0.23
69	23	"Long Shot"	Miguel Puga	Rosemary Contreras	Isaiah Kim	September 23, 2022	319	0.23
"The Oddfather": Carlos is told by Frida that her mural needs a padrino (Spanish for "godfather") for Carlitos' christening party. Not wanting to mess up like he did when he picked Sergio as Carl's padrino, Carlos looks for a suitable candidate. His first choice is Romeo who he tests with a teddy bear-type nanny cam. His next choice is Mr. Nakamura who scares Carlitos with his vintage clown collection. He ends up going with Vito after he saves Carlitos from an approaching skater. Though Carlos starts to worry that Vito's usual antics will start rubbing off on Carlitos. "Long Shot": At Cesar Chavez Academy, Principal Valenzuela informs Carlota that she is missing a PE credit which she needs to make up or else she cannot graduate. Carlota informs Ronnie Anne that she is not good at sports as Ronnie Anne offers to help her pick a sport. They start with soccer where she cannot get the soccer ball into a net. The next choice is pole vaulting which is Mrs. Kernicky's favorite sport where she cannot get over the bar. Then she tries fencing where she accidentally cuts off Becky's ponytail. She soon finds herself pulling off basketball moves and ends up in a game against Vito and Bruno. She succeeds in the sport as it leads to her joining the school's basketball game.
70	24	"Flock This Way"	Mike Nordstrom	Alec Schwimmer	Susan Nguyen & Jaylen Tate-Lucas	September 30, 2022	320	0.18
70	24	"Movers and Fakers"	Miguel Puga	Alejandro Bien-Willner	Nic Parris	September 30, 2022	320	0.18
"Flock This Way": Rosa takes the Casagrandes on a trip to the woods to engage in her new hobby of birdwatching. Upon arrival, Rosa tries various bird calls where she meets David Naberbirdy who is a professional bird enthusiast. Ronnie Anne, Bobby, Carlotta, C.J., and Carl secretly disguise Sergio as different birds in her birdwatching book like a woodpecker, an owl, a falcon, and the Vogelkop bird of paradise from New Guinea. David Naberbirdy is fooled by Sergio's disguise where he thinks it is a talking Vogelkop bird of paradise and captures him so that he can sell him to a rich bird collector. "Movers and Fakers": Bobby is in his latest call with Lori where he cannot find space due to the activities of his family. Lori compares this lifestyle to her family's lifestyle. Upon a former tenant named Jean-Philippe moving to France, Lori advises Bobby to move in to the apartment as he claims that Maria and Rosa would not take the news seriously. After foreseeing their reaction that involves Rosa using an ultra chancla, Bobby secretly moves in to Jean-Phiippe's apartment much to the concern of Lori. Bobby works to cover it up to the rest of the Casagrande family as Lori advises him to tell her family the truth when he learns about Jean-Philippe's cooking lessons with Rosa, Hector and Maria, where they are unaware that Jean-Philippe moved away.

=== Shorts (2021–22) ===
No.	Title	Directed by	Written by	Storyboarded by	Original release date	Prod. code
1	"I'm Back"	-	-	-	July 16, 2021	106
1	"Do the Fruit Shake"	-	-	-	July 16, 2021	106
"I'm Back": An extended music video of the song "I'm Back" from the episode "Operation Popstar". "Do the Fruit Shake": An extended music video of the song "Do the Fruit Shake" from the episode of the same name.
2	"Operation: After School Snack"	Mike Nordstrom	Joshua Hoskison	Nic Parris	July 23, 2021	107
2	"Meet the Mercado!"	Miguel Puga	Rebeca B. Delgado	Nic Parris	July 23, 2021	107
"Operation: After School Snack": Secret agents Carl, Sergio, and Lalo attempt to retrieve a bag of chips from Carlitos. "Meet the Mercado!": Ronnie Anne and Bobby offer to show the viewers, the 1,000th customer, around the mercado with a special prize at the end.
3	"The History of the Casagrandes"	Miguel Puga	Lalo Alcaraz	Nic Parris	August 6, 2021	109
3	"K-Pop Dance Battle"	Alan Foreman	Rebecca Banks	Nic Parris	August 6, 2021	109
"The History of the Casagrandes": Hector performs a song talking about his family's history during a school play Ronnie Anne is in. "K-Pop Dance Battle": Ronnie Anne and Sergio compete on the Twelve is Midnight Dance-Off machine in order to win a jacket worn by Yoon Kwan.
4	"We Jam Contigo"	Isaiah Kim	Rebeca B. Delgado	Isaiah Kim	January 21, 2022	111
An extended music video of the song "We Jam Contiago" from the episode "The Bros in the Band".
5	"Froggy Lake"	Rebecca Schauer	Julia Rothenbuhler-Garcia	Amanda Tran	May 6, 2022	118
Adelaide injures her ankle while practicing for Swan Lake. To cheer her up, Sid and the animals in Becca's care put on their own play called Froggy Lake.
6	"Creature Seekers"	Rebecca Schauer	Rebeca B. Delgado	Taylor Chang	May 13, 2022	119
A strange noise is heard in the apartment building that is keeping Ronnie Anne awake. Suspicious that there is a creature in the building, Ronnie Anne and Sid hold a sleepover stakeout to catch it.
7	"Dog Day Afternoon"	Isaiah Kim	Kristen G. Smith	Jaylen Tate-Lucas	June 10, 2022	121
While the Casagrandes are away, Lalo starts engaging in different activities during his day afternoon.

== Film (2024) ==
Title	Directed by	Written by	Storyboarded by	Original release date
The Casagrandes Movie	Miguel Puga	Tony Gama-Lobo, Rebecca May, Lalo Alcaraz & Rosemary Contreras	TBA	March 22, 2024
After a surprise family trip to Mexico derails Ronnie Anne's birthday plans, she is determined to prove she's old enough to do her own thing – even if it means confronting an ancient preteen demigod whose angst has apocalyptic potential!
