= The Loud House (franchise) =

American multimedia franchise

- Created by: Chris Savino
- Original work: "Bathroom Break!!" (2014)
- Owners: Nickelodeon Group (Skydance)
- Years: 2014; 2016–present

Print publications
- Novels: List of novels
- Comics: List(s) of graphic novels

Films and television
- Films: The Loud House Movie (2021); A Loud House Christmas (2021); A Really Haunted Loud House (2023); The Casagrandes Movie (2024); No Time to Spy (2024); A Loud House Christmas Movie: Naughty or Nice (2025)
- Television series: The Really Loud House (2022–2024)
- Animated series: The Loud House (2016–present); The Casagrandes (2019–2022)

Games
- Video games: Ultimate Treehouse (2018); Outta Control (2020); Nickelodeon Kart Racers 2: Grand Prix (2020); Nickelodeon All-Star Brawl (2021)

Official website
- www.theloudhouse.com

The Loud House is an American multimedia franchise created by Chris Savino and owned by Nickelodeon. It began with the short "Bathroom Break!!" in 2014, before being developed into the series of the same name which started in 2016. It is based on Savino's own childhood growing up in a large family, with the art style largely influenced by newspaper comic strips. The franchise also includes a spin-off series The Casagrandes, airing from October 14, 2019, to September 30, 2022, and the live-action television series The Really Loud House, which premiered November 3, 2022. The franchise expanded to film with The Loud House Movie on August 20, 2021, followed by A Loud House Christmas on November 26, 2021, A Really Haunted Loud House on September 28, 2023, The Casagrandes Movie on March 22, 2024, No Time to Spy on June 21, 2024, and A Loud House Christmas Movie: Naughty or Nice on November 21, 2025.

The franchise primarily focuses on Lincoln Loud, the only boy and the middle child in a family of eleven children (with ten sisters of distinctive personalities) residing in the fictional town of Royal Woods, Michigan, who occasionally breaks the fourth wall to explain to the viewers the chaotic conditions and sibling relationships of the household, and continually devises plans to make his life in the Loud House better. Since its debut, the franchise has gained high ratings, with the original series becoming the top-rated children's animated series on American television within its first month on the air, further receiving considerable media attention and nominations at both the 28th and the 29th GLAAD Media Awards for its inclusion of Howard and Harold McBride, two supporting characters who are an interracial gay married couple. In May 2017, the characters of Lincoln Loud and Clyde McBride were featured on the front cover of Variety as an example of diverse characters in children's television.

== Background ==
=== Creation ===
Chris Savino conceived of the idea for The Loud House based on his own experiences growing up in a large family. Early in development, the Loud family was going to be composed of rabbits, but this was terminated when an executive, Jenna Boyd, asked Savino to make them human. The idea of the Loud family being rabbits became used as Lincoln's dream in the Season 3 episode "White Hare". He pitched the idea to Nickelodeon in 2013 as a 2 1/2-minute short for their annual Animated Shorts Program.

=== Main characters ===
The main characters of the franchise are the members of the Loud household, which consists of parents Rita and Lynn Loud Sr., their son 11 year old Lincoln and 10 daughters 18 year old Lori, 17 year old Leni, 16 year old Luna, 15 year old Luan, 14 year old Lynn Jr, 9 year old Lucy, 7 year old twins Lana and Lola, 5 year old Lisa, and 2 year old Lily. According to Chris Savino, the family lives in the fictional town of Royal Woods, Michigan.

== Television series ==
Series	Season	Episodes	Originally released			Showrunner(s)
Series	Season	Episodes	First released	Last released	Network	Showrunner(s)
The Loud House	1	52	May 2, 2016	November 8, 2016	Nickelodeon	Chris Savino
The Loud House	2	49	November 9, 2016	December 1, 2017	Nickelodeon	Chris Savino
The Loud House	3	48	January 19, 2018	March 7, 2019	Nickelodeon	Chris Savino; Michael Rubiner
The Loud House	4	50	May 27, 2019	July 23, 2020	Nickelodeon	Michael Rubiner
The Loud House	Special		May 23, 2020		Nickelodeon	Michael Rubiner
The Loud House	5	47	September 11, 2020	March 4, 2022	Nickelodeon	Michael Rubiner
The Loud House	Specials		February 15, 2021	September 4, 2023	Nickelodeon	Michael Rubiner
The Loud House	6	49	March 11, 2022	May 16, 2023	Nickelodeon	Michael Rubiner
The Loud House	7	38	May 17, 2023	June 6, 2024	Nickelodeon	Michael Rubiner
The Loud House	8	22	June 10, 2024	July 25, 2025	Nickelodeon	Michael Rubiner
The Loud House	9	35	August 1, 2025	April 24, 2026	Nickelodeon	Michael Rubiner
The Loud House	10	TBA	May 1, 2026	TBA	Nickelodeon	Michael Rubiner
The Casagrandes	1	38	October 14, 2019	September 25, 2020	Nickelodeon	Michael Rubiner
The Casagrandes	2	37	October 9, 2020	September 10, 2021	Nickelodeon	Michael Rubiner
The Casagrandes	3	37	September 17, 2021	September 30, 2022	Nickelodeon	Michael Rubiner
The Really Loud House	1	20	November 3, 2022	June 29, 2023	Nickelodeon	Tim Hobert
The Really Loud House	2	19	February 19, 2024	November 26, 2024	Nickelodeon	Tim Hobert

== Films ==
=== No Time to Spy (2024) ===
The second animated film in the franchise, was first unveiled on April 26, 2024, on Nickelodeon's Instagram page. It premiered on June 21, 2024, on Nickelodeon, while it also simultaneously streamed on Paramount+.

=== Naughty or Nice (2025) ===
A second Christmas movie in this franchise was released on November 21, 2025.

== Literature ==
=== Graphic novels ===
The Loud House has spawned a graphic novel series by publisher Papercutz. The graphic novels are by either crew members or other incoming artists, and dive into the world of the show and the characters within. They are usually anthology comics, however, others are arranged on certain themes, while others have overarching storylines.

==== Running series ====
Release date	Volume #	Title	ISBN
May 9, 2017	1	There Will Be Chaos	978-1-62991-741-2
November 21, 2017	2	There Will Be More Chaos	978-1-62991-824-2
March 20, 2018	3	Live Life Loud!	978-1-62991-862-4
August 21, 2018	4	Family Tree	978–1545800058
November 27, 2018	5	After Dark	978–1545801543
May 7, 2019	6	Loud and Proud	978–1545802106
August 20, 2019	7	The Struggle Is Real	978–1629917979
November 26, 2019	8	Livin' La Casa Loud!	978–1545803431
June 9, 2020	9	Ultimate Hangout	978–1545804056
August 11, 2020	10	The Many Faces of Lincoln Loud	978–1545804735
November 17, 2020	11	Who's the Loudest?	978–1545805589
March 16, 2021	12	The Case of the Stolen Drawers	978–1545806210
August 24, 2021	13	Lucy Rolls the Dice	978–1545807057
December 28, 2021	14	Guessing Games	978–1545807248
March 29, 2022	15	The Missing Linc	978–1545808689
September 27, 2022	16	Loud and Clear	978–1545808894
November 29, 2022	17	Sibling Rivalry	978–1545809792
July 4, 2023	18	Sister Resister	978–1545810361
October 17, 2023	19	Bump It Loud	978–1545810569
June 4, 2024 (Paperback); June 25, 2024 (Hardcover)	20	Totally Not a Loud	978–1545811412
September 3, 2024	21	Howling Good Time	978–1545801031
November 12, 2024	22	Powered Up!	978–1545812389
January 21, 2025	23	Games and Gains	978–1545816356
August 26, 2025	24	Movin' to the Music	978-1545816943
November 25, 2025	25	Loud Party	978-1545820537
January 27, 2026	26	On with the Snow!	978-1545823033
May 12, 2026	27	Space Case	978-1545826416
September 1, 2026	28	Night Haunts	978-1545834091

==== Seasonal/holiday series ====
Release date	Title	ISBN
October 6, 2020	Winter Special	978–1545806876
June 1, 2021	Summer Special	978–1545806920
December 7, 2021	Love Out Loud	978–1545808542
July 26, 2022	Back to School Special	978–1545808900
February 7, 2023	Super Special	978–1545810248
November 14, 2023	Loud Spies	978–1545810637
July 2, 2024	Spooky Special	978–1545801758
May 27, 2025	Loudest and Proudest	978-1545818473
November 25, 2025	Freezing and Frio! (Note: Branded under The Casagrandes)	978-1545820407
June 16, 2026	The Loud House 10th Anniversary Special	978-1545826720
November 24, 2026	The Loud House x Casagrandes Holiday Special	978-1545834428

==== The Casagrandes running series ====
Release date	Volume	Title	ISBN
May 4, 2021	1	We're All Familia	978-1545806227
February 22, 2022	2	Anything for Familia	978-1545808634
June 28, 2022	3	Brand Stinkin' New	978-1545809105
October 18, 2022	4	Friends and Family	978-1545809631
June 13, 2023	5	Going Out of Business	978-1545810477
April 2, 2024	6	Familia Feud	978-1545811399
September 30, 2025	7	Sweet Skates	978-1545819012
January 27, 2026	8	Selfie Espectacular	978-1545820773
April 28, 2026	9	Peppers Primavera!	978-1545823507
July 14, 2026	10	D-I-Why?!	978-1545827154
November 3, 2026	11	The Tres Leches Trials!	978-1545834220

=== Chapter book series ===
The Loud House has produced a series of chapter books with original stories, initially published by Random House before switching to Scholastic.

Release date	Title	Author	Original publisher	ISBN
July 3, 2018	Who Ghost There?	Karla Sakas Shropshire	Random House (New York)	978-1-5247-7035-8 (Random House); 978-1-33868-152-9 (Scholastic)
July 3, 2018	Arcade or Bust!	Amaris Glass	Random House (New York)	978-1-5247-7036-5 (Random House); 978-1-33868-151-2 (Scholastic)
January 8, 2019	Campaign Chaos!	Mollie Freilich	Random House (New York)	978-1-98485-148-2 (Random House); 978-1-33868-153-6 (Scholastic)
October 6, 2020	The Ultimate Party	Mollie Freilich	Scholastic (New York)	978-1338681543
January 4, 2022	Case of the Missing Cake	Daniel Mauleón	Scholastic (New York)	978-1338775549
September 6, 2022	No Bus, No Fuss	Shannon Penney	Scholastic (New York)	978-1338847963

== Home media ==
DVD Releases:

- The Casagrandes: The Complete First Season (February 2, 2021)
- The Loud House: The Complete First Season (October 19, 2021)
- The Loud House: The Complete Second Season (October 19, 2021)
- The Loud House: The Complete Third Season (May 24, 2022)
- The Really Loud House: Season One (February 27, 2024)
- The Loud House: The Complete Seasons 1, 2 & 3 (June 16, 2024)
- The Loud House: A Loud House Christmas Collection (October 29, 2024)

== Video games ==
=== The Loud House: Ultimate Treehouse (2018) ===
A mobile game based on the series called The Loud House: Ultimate Treehouse was released on September 20, 2018, for iOS and Android.

=== The Loud House: Outta Control (2020) ===
The Loud House: Outta Control was released on Apple Arcade on February 14, 2020. In the game, the siblings try to get through to their goals without running into each other.

=== Nickelodeon Kart Racers 2: Grand Prix (2020) ===
Lincoln, Lucy, and Clyde appear as playable characters, with the rest of Lincoln's sisters appearing as unlockable pit crew characters, in the 2020 racing video game Nickelodeon Kart Racers 2: Grand Prix. Lincoln, Lucy and Clyde are confirmed to return in the 2022 sequel Nickelodeon Kart Racers 3: Slime Speedway, with Bentley Griffin, Jessica DiCicco, and Jaeden White reprising their roles.

=== Nickelodeon All-Star Brawl (2021) ===
Lincoln and Lucy are also playable in the 2021 title Nickelodeon All-Star Brawl; a patch to the game added voice acting with their roles being reprised by Bentley Griffin and Jessica DiCicco.

=== Nickelodeon All-Star Brawl 2 (2023) ===
Lucy returns as a playable character with Jessica DiCicco reprising her role. Lincoln appears in the game now as a background character in the Loud Castle stage.
