= The Casagrandes Movie =

2024 film by Miguel Puga

- Release poster
- Directed by: Miguel Puga
- Screenplay by: Tony Gama-Lobo; Rebecca May; Lalo Alcaraz; Rosemary Contreras
- Story by: Lalo Alcaraz; Rosemary Contreras; Tony Gama-Lobo; Rebecca May
- Based on: The characters by Chris Savino
- Starring: Izabella Alvarez; Sumalee Montano; Paulina Chávez; Angélica Aragón; Sonia Manzano; Kate del Castillo; Alex Cazares; Carlos PenaVega; Carlos Alazraqui; Ruben Garfias; Leah Mei Gold; Alexa PenaVega; Cristo Fernández; Sergio Aragonés; Roxana Ortega; Jared Kozak
- Edited by: Jhoanne Reyes
- Music by: Marcelo Treviño
- Production company: Nickelodeon Movies (Note: Animation outsourced to Mighty Animation.)
- Distributed by: Netflix
- Release date: March 22, 2024
- Running time: 81 minutes
- Country: United States
- Language: English

The Casagrandes Movie is a 2024 American animated dark fantasy comedy film that is a continuation of the Nickelodeon television series The Casagrandes. The film was directed by series co-developer Miguel Puga and stars the show's regular voice cast with the addition of Paulina Chávez, Angélica Aragón, Kate del Castillo, Cristo Fernández, and Sergio Aragonés. The story follows newly minted Ronnie Anne and her family as they go on a trip to Mexico and face off against an ancient preteen demigoddess. It is the second animated film in The Loud House franchise following The Loud House Movie (2021), and the fourth overall.

The film was produced by Nickelodeon Movies, with the animation provided by Mighty Animation. It was released on Netflix on March 22, 2024, to mostly positive reviews from critics.

The soundtrack is available on platforms featuring Nikki Clan, Pato Machete, La Coreañera, Malibu Kings, and more.

== Plot ==
Ronnie Anne is celebrating her 12th birthday. She intends to celebrate her "Summer of 12" at Xtreme Eddie's, a dangerous theme park open to only 12 year olds and older, with her best friend, Sid Chang, but her family surprises her with a trip to Japunda, Mexico, much to her dismay. In Mexico, Ronnie Anne takes interest to a necklace that a shopkeeper claims to hold the last connection between humans and gods, but Maria dismisses it as a hoax. However, Ronnie Anne buys the necklace behind her mother's back.

The family head to Mama Lupe's house, where Ronnie Anne points out a nearby mountain that resembles a half-pipe. Carlos tells her that the mountain is named after the petrified form of the demigoddess Punguari, whose parents denied her from becoming a full-fledged god due to her rebellious nature and lack of responsibility. Dissatisfied, Punguari snuck out and stole a mask that allowed her to become a god; however, the ground around her started to crack and separate. Sisiki, her mother, was forced to petrify her daughter; should Punguari be freed now, Mexico would be in danger.

The next day, Ronnie Anne decides to go to Mount Punguari, where she starts to synchronize skate with Sid via video call. However, Ronnie Anne falls off her skateboard, breaking her necklace and releasing Punguari. Soon, a young girl, who introduces herself as Shara, calls for help, her leg having been trapped underneath a branch following an earthquake. Ronnie Anne, accompanied by Shara, is confronted by her mother, who is angry that she snuck out to do her own thing. Later that evening, Maria expresses her frustration about Ronnie Anne's rebellious nature, prompting Mama Lupe to take her outside to practice her chancla throwing.

Shara and Ronnie Anne sneak away to a museum, where Ronnie Anne uncovers the gateway to the realm holding the mask. Shara, taking the mask, reveals that she is in fact Punguari all along, leaving Ronnie Anne trapped within the realm. However, her grandfather Hector ends up finding her through a magical mirror. Ronnie Anne explains her plight to her family, who sneak into the museum at night to save her. Ronnie Anne realizes that the story of Punguari was wrong: as Punguari wielded the mask, the cracks forming within the ground was allowing another deity - Ucumu, the god of the underworld - to rise up from the ground.

Punguari harnesses the mask's power to make herself a god, draining the sea and creating a temple in its wake. However, the earth starts to crack once more. Ronnie Anne decides to go to Punguari's temple herself, where she confronts Punguari and tells her the true story: her parents petrified her to protect her from Ucumu. They notice that Maria, who tried to get to the temple, is about to slip into the newly-formed cracks. Punguari shapeshifts into a coyote and runs toward Maria, who uses her itinerary to swing herself to safety. The family and Punguari regroup as Ucumu rises from the cracks.

Ronnie Anne rides off with Punguari into battle, while Maria orders Lalo to dig for a giant chancla, and Bobby grabs the sacred flame housed beneath Mama Lupe's house. Bobby's group returns to the mainland as Ucumu summons a group of minions to attack. Lupe's housekeeper, Don Tacho, crashes the plane he was piloting into the minions, taking them out, and each Casagrande utilizes their strengths to fight them off. Punguari is eventually knocked out by Ucumu, who proceeds to drag her into a skull on his mask.

Maria, aided by a group of Chancla Warriors, is able to lift the giant chancla long enough for Frida to knock a paper cutout of Arturo, which is engulfed in the sacred flame, into the chancla, which strikes Ucumu, reducing him into a skeleton. Ronnie Anne fires at Ucumu, destroying him and petrifying all of his minions. Punguari seals the cracks using the temple she built, preventing Ucumu's return, and reunites with her parents, who had been turned into gemstones. Sisiki and Maria reconcile with their respective daughters and put aside their differences.

Punguari's father, Chipiri, restores the mainland back to its former glory, and the Festival of the New Fire is now being held at Mama Lupe's island. Maria presents her daughter with another gemstone as Punguari, Sisiki and Chipiri watch the celebrations from afar.

== Voice cast ==
- Izabella Alvarez as Ronnie Anne
- Sumalee Montano as Maria
- Paulina Chávez as Punguari/Shara
- Angélica Aragón as Lupe
- Sonia Manzano as Rosa
- Kate del Castillo as Sisiki
- Alex Cazares as Carl and Villager Boy
- Carlos PenaVega as:
  - Bobby
  - Flat Arturo
- Carlos Alazraqui as:
  - Carlos
  - Sergio
  - Don Tacho
- Ruben Garfias as Hector
- Leah Mei Gold as Sid
- Alexa PenaVega as Carlota
- Cristo Fernández as Chipiri
- Sergio Aragonés as Paco
- Roxana Ortega as:
  - Frida
  - Chancla Warrior
- Jared Kozak as CJ
- Jorge R. Gutierrez as Felipe the Street Vendor
- Kurly Tlapoyawa as:
  - Security Guard
  - Villager Man #2
- Fabio Tassone as Arturo
- Cristina Milizia as:
  - Carlitos
  - Villager Woman
  - Docent
  - Tourist Woman #3
- Eric Bauza as Pedestrian in Suit
- Darin McGowan as Happy Neighbor
- April M. Lawrence as Tourist Woman #1
- Caitlyn Connelly as Tourist Woman #2
- Dee Bradley Baker as Lalo

== Production ==
A film based on the animated television series, The Casagrandes, was first announced by Nickelodeon via a press release in April 2023. The Casagrandes Movie's voice cast is led by series regulars Izabella Alvarez, Sumalee Montano, Sonia Manzano, and Angélica Aragón, with other leading cast including Paulina Chávez, Kate del Castillo, and Cristo Fernández. The film was directed by The Casagrandes co-developer and The Loud House veteran Miguel Puga, and written by Tony Gama-Lobo, Rebecca May, Lalo Alcaraz, and Rosemary Contreras. The film is produced by Nickelodeon Animation Studio, and Michael Rubiner—who co-developed and served as an executive producer on the series—also executive produced the film.

== Release ==
The Casagrandes Movie was released by Netflix on March 22, 2024.

== Reception ==
The film has received mostly positive reviews from critics. Jennifer Green of Common Sense Media gave the film a 3 out of 5 star rating. She commended the film for its representation and characters and said, "If parents can sit through the cartoon violence, they might enjoy some of these messages and the sillier asides as well." Rosa Parra of The Latino Slant similarly gave the film a 3 out of 5 rating. She praised the film for its animation, representation, and themes of family, but criticized the story for its formulaic nature. She wrote, "Overall, The Casagrandes Movie is a beautifully animated kids movie. It's a fun adventure about family, community, ancestry, and rebellious youth."
