= La Cucaracha (comic strip) =

American comic strip by Lalo Alcaraz

- Author(s): Lalo Alcaraz
- Website: www.gocomics.com/lacucaracha
- Current status/schedule: Current daily strip
- Launch date: 1992; 33 years ago
- Syndicate(s): Universal Press Syndicate/Universal Uclick/Andrews McMeel Syndication (2002–present)
- Genre(s): Satire

La Cucaracha (Spanish for The Cockroach) is a nationally syndicated daily comic strip by Lalo Alcaraz. First published in the LA Weekly in 1992, La Cucaracha's satirical themes reflect U.S./Mexican, and Latino culture and politics. Lalo's characters are symbolic of Latino culture in the United States, particularly from Southern California, where Alcaraz is from. Recurring characters include Eddie, Cuco, and Vero.

It is syndicated by Andrews McMeel Syndication, and is printed in over 60 newspapers. It began daily publication in November 2002. It is the only 'political' Latino-themed syndicated daily comic strip in the U.S.

It is one of several politically themed comic strips in mainstream papers. It is similar, in that manner, to Doonesbury, Candorville, The Boondocks and Prickly City (although the latter is of an opposite political persuasion). Some see a distinct influence of Mexican artist Rius.

The strip is considered one of the most controversial in the history of American comic strips, labeled "anti-white" and "divisive" by its detractors and defended as "truthful" and "progressive" by its supporters. It was dropped by four papers after a deluge of reader complaints. Alcaraz satirized his hate-mailers by drawing a letter-writer pleading, "Please drop 'La Cucaracha' and bring back my favorite comic strip, 'Whitesville USA' by Aryan McCracker." In regard to this response, Alcaraz said, "I'm sorry, but I'm just not polite about this stuff."

Universal Press Syndicate considered La Cucaracha an unqualified success, and signed Alcaraz to a ten-year contract.

== See also ==
- Baldo
