= Izabella Alvarez =

American actress (born 2004)

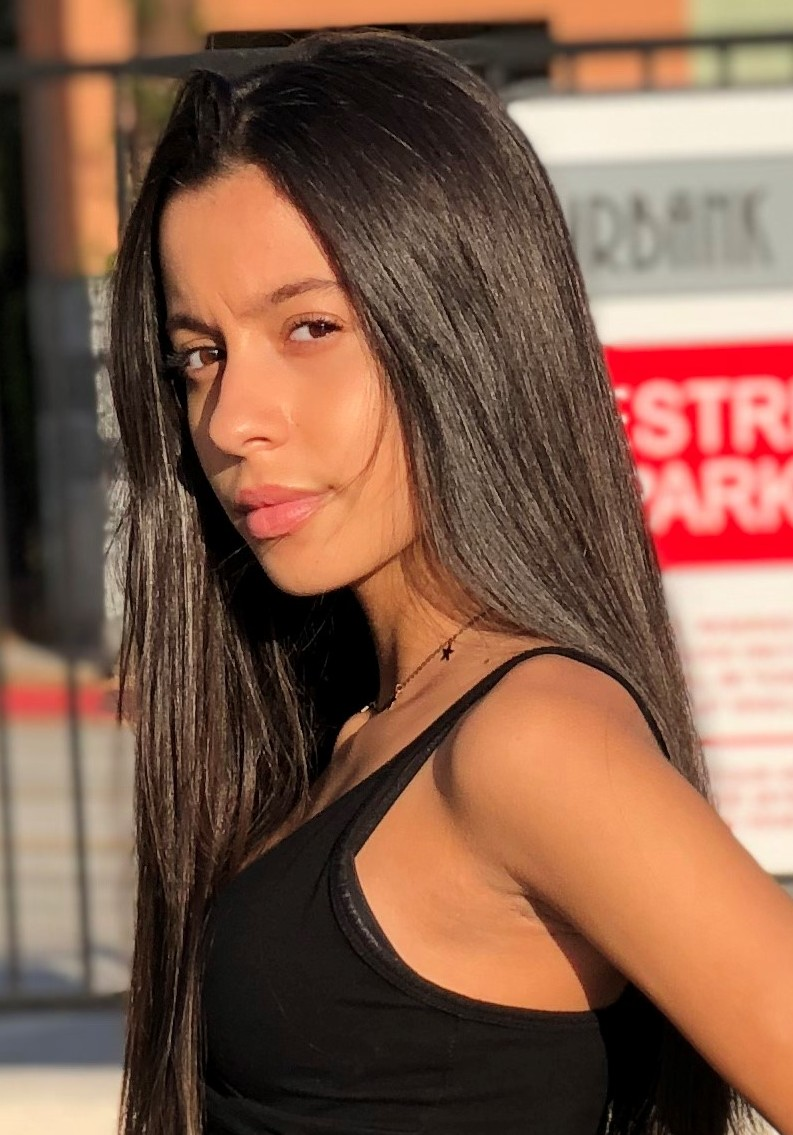
- Alvarez in 2019
- Born: March 1, 2004 (age 22); Irvine, California, U.S.
- Occupation: Actress
- Years active: 2010–present
- Website: www.izabellaalvarez.com

Izabella Alvarez (born March 1, 2004) is an American actress known for her roles in television shows such as Shameless, Westworld, and Walk the Prank. She plays Vera in the Disney+ film Magic Camp. Her most recent role is the voice of Ronalda "Ronnie Anne" Santiago in the Nickelodeon animated series The Loud House, its spin-off installment, The Casagrandes, as well as their respective films, The Loud House Movie (2021) and The Casagrandes Movie (2024).

== Career ==
Alvarez began acting at the age of six in 2010. Her first role was in a retail television commercial with her family. Since that time, she has played roles for film and television.

Her first recurring role was that of Sarah in Season 4 of Shameless. Alvarez was cast as a regular in the 2017 made-for-television film Raised by Wolves where she played Dolly Gabel, the daughter of Sheila Gabel (Georgia King). She is also cast as Vera in the 2020 film Magic Camp.

Additional recurring roles include on Splitting Up Together, Westworld, and Walk the Prank.

In 2019, Alvarez provided the voice of Ronalda "Ronnie Anne" Santiago in The Loud House and its spin-off series The Casagrandes where the role was previously voiced by Breanna Yde.

== Filmography ==
=== Film ===
| Year | Title | Role | Notes |
|---|---|---|---|
| 2016 | Little Dead Rotting Hood | Kendra | |
| 2017 | Raised by Wolves | Dolly Gable | Made for television film |
| 2018 | Collisions | Itan | |
| 2020 | Magic Camp | Vera Costa | |
| 2021 | The Loud House Movie | Ronnie Anne Santiago (voice) | |
| 2024 | The Casagrandes Movie | Ronnie Anne Santiago (voice) | |

=== Television ===
| Year | Title | Role | Notes |
|---|---|---|---|
| 2014 | Anger Management | Myla | Episode: "Charlie & the Return of the Danger Girl" |
| 2014 | Shameless | Sarah | 4 episodes |
| 2016 | The Odd Couple | Birdie | Episode: "I Kid, You Not" |
| 2016 | Teachers | Debbie | Episode: "Pilot" |
| 2016–2018 | Westworld | Lawrence's Daughter | Recurring role |
| 2017 | Henry Danger | Sharon | Episode: "Balloons of Doom" |
| 2017–2018 | Walk the Prank | Anna | |
| 2018 | S.W.A.T. | Amy | Episode: "The Tiffany Experience" |
| 2018 | Splitting Up Together | Hazel | Recurring role |
| 2018–2025 | Craig of the Creek | Wildernessa (voice) | Recurring role |
| 2019 | Sorry for Your Loss | Skylar | Episode: "Mr. Greer" |
| 2019–present | The Loud House | Ronnie Anne Santiago (voice) | Recurring role (seasons 4–present) |
| 2019–2022 | The Casagrandes | Ronnie Anne Santiago (voice) | Main role |
| 2021 | The Republic of Sarah | Maya | Main role |
| 2022 | Euphoria | Marta | Episodes: "The Theater and Its Double" and "All My Life, My Heart Has Yearned for a Thing I Cannot Name" |

== Awards and nominations ==
| Year | Award | Category | Work | Result | Refs |
|---|---|---|---|---|---|
| 2019 | Woods Hole Film Festival | Best Actor Feature Youth | Collisions | Won | |
| 2020 | Imagen Awards | Best Young Actor - Television | Collisions | Won | |
| 2020 | Imagen Awards | Best Young Actor - Television | The Casagrandes | Nominated | |
| 2021 | Imagen Awards | Best Voice-Over Actor - Television | The Casagrandes | Nominated | |
