= The Casagrandes =

American animated television series

- Genre: Animated sitcom; Comedy
- Based on: The Loud House by Chris Savino
- Developed by: Michael Rubiner; Miguel Puga
- Voices of: Izabella Alvarez; Carlos PenaVega; Sumalee Montano; Sonia Manzano; Ruben Garfias; Carlos Alazraqui; Roxana Ortega; Alexa PenaVega; Jared Kozak; Alex Cazares; Cristina Milizia; Dee Bradley Baker; Eugenio Derbez; Ken Jeong; Melissa Joan Hart; Leah Mei Gold; Lexi Sexton
- Theme music composer: Germaine Franco
- Opening theme: "The Casagrandes Theme Song" performed by Ally Brooke
- Composers: Germaine Franco; Jonathan Hylander
- Country of origin: United States
- Original language: English
- No. of seasons: 3
- No. of episodes: 70 (112 segments) (list of episodes)

Production
- Executive producer: Michael Rubiner
- Producers: Karen Malach (episodes 1-34); Yvette E. Dibello (episodes 36-68); Ian Murray (episodes 69-70)
- Running time: 11 minutes (regular segments); 22 minutes (special segments)
- Production company: Nickelodeon Animation Studio

Original release
- Network: Nickelodeon
- Release: October 14, 2019 – September 30, 2022

Related
- The Loud House

The Casagrandes is an American animated sitcom developed by Michael Rubiner and Miguel Puga that aired on Nickelodeon from October 14, 2019 to September 30, 2022. It is a spin-off of The Loud House and the second television series in the overall franchise, which follows the adventures of Ronnie Anne, her brother Bobby Santiago, and their family living in the fictional Great Lakes City. An animated feature film which serves as a continuation and series finale to the show was released on Netflix on March 22, 2024.

== Premise ==
Having moved to Great Lakes City back in The Loud House episode "The Loudest Mission: Relative Chaos", Ronnie Anne Santiago, her older brother Bobby, and their mother Maria move in with their extended family, the Casagrandes - consisting of grandparents Hector and Rosa, aunt and uncle Frida and Carlos, their cousins Carlota, C.J., Carl, and Carlitos, and their pets Lalo and Sergio. In the city, Ronnie Anne meets new friends like Sid Chang, learns more about her relatives, and explores the endless possibilities in Great Lakes City. Meanwhile, Bobby helps Hector run the mercado as he acquaints himself with his family's quirky neighbors.

== Episodes ==
Season	Segments	Episodes	Originally released	
Season	Segments	Episodes	First released	Last released
1	38	25	October 14, 2019	September 25, 2020
2	37	21	October 9, 2020	September 10, 2021
3	37	24	September 17, 2021	September 30, 2022

== Characters ==
- Ronnie Anne Santiago (voiced by Izabella Alvarez)
- Bobby Santiago (voiced by Carlos PenaVega)
- Maria Casagrande-Santiago (voiced by Sumalee Montano)
- Rosa Casagrande (voiced by Sonia Manzano)
- Hector Casagrande (voiced by Ruben Garfias)
- Carlos Casagrande (voiced by Carlos Alazraqui)
- Frida Puga-Casagrande (voiced by Roxana Ortega)
- Carlota Casagrande (voiced by Alexa PenaVega)
- Carlos "CJ" Casagrande Jr. (voiced by Jared Kozak)
- Carlino "Carl" Casagrande (voiced by Alex Cazares)
- Carlitos Casagrande (voiced by Roxana Ortega up to ep. 6, Cristina Milizia from ep. 7 onward)
- Sergio (voiced by Carlos Alazraqui)
- Lalo (vocal effects provided by Dee Bradley Baker)
- Dr. Arturo Santiago (voiced by Eugenio Derbez)
- Mr. Stanley Chang (voiced by Ken Jeong)
- Mrs. Becca Chang (voiced by Melissa Joan Hart)
- Sid Chang (voiced by Leah Mei Gold)
- Adelaide Chang (voiced by Lexi Sexton)

== Production ==
On March 6, 2018, it was announced that Nickelodeon was developing a spinoff of The Loud House under the working title of Los Casagrandes. On July 2, 2018, it was announced that Nickelodeon officially green-lit the comedy series with a 20-episode order. On February 14, 2019, it was announced that The Casagrandes, formerly Los Casagrandes, would premiere in October 2019.

On May 7, 2019, it was announced that Eugenio Derbez, Ken Jeong, Melissa Joan Hart, Leah Mei Gold, and Lexi Sexton joined the voice cast. Mike Rubiner serves as executive producer, while Karen Malach serves as producer. On September 4, 2019, it was announced that the series would premiere on October 14, 2019. The series is produced by Nickelodeon.

On February 19, 2020, it was announced that the series was renewed for a second season of 20 episodes, which premiered on October 9, 2020. On September 24, 2020, it was announced that the series was renewed for a third season, which premiered on September 17, 2021.

On February 17, 2022, Axios reported that Nickelodeon had cancelled the series, though the characters would continue to appear in The Loud House.

== Film ==
On December 11, 2023, it was announced that The Casagrandes Movie would release on Netflix in 2024. The film is directed by Miguel Puga and written by Tony Gama-Lobo & Rebecca May, and Lalo Alcaraz & Rosemary Contreras. On February 1, 2024, it was announced that the film would be released on March 22.

== Home media ==
Region	Set title	Season(s)	Aspect ratio	Episode count	Time length	Release date
1	The Complete First Season	1	16:9	20	450 minutes	February 2, 2021
3	The Complete First Season	1	16:9	20	450 minutes	June 8, 2021

== Reception ==
The series received positive reviews. Joyce Slaton of Common Sense Media described the series as a "charming Loud House spin-off about Mexican American family." She further noted that cartoon violence only happens infrequently, with differences between characters rarely coming up, and said that while "humor can be slightly vulgar," it is a lot of fun, and is "worth your while."

=== Ratings ===
Viewership and ratings per season of The Casagrandes
Season	Episodes	First aired		Last aired		Avg. viewers (millions)
Season	Episodes	Date	Viewers (millions)	Date	Viewers (millions)	Avg. viewers (millions)
1	25	October 14, 2019	0.61	September 25, 2020	0.61	0.68
2	21	October 9, 2020	0.52	September 10, 2021	0.33	0.44
3	23	September 17, 2021	0.41	September 26, 2022	0.18	0.30

=== Awards and nominations ===
Year	Award	Category	Result	Refs
2020	NAMIC Vision Awards	Animation	Nominated	
2020	Daytime Emmy Awards	Outstanding Children's Animated Series	Nominated	
2020	Daytime Emmy Awards	Outstanding Main Title for an Animated Program	Won	
2020	Imagen Awards	Best Children's Programming	Nominated	
2021	Imagen Awards	Best Youth Programming	Won	
2022	Imagen Awards	Best Youth Programming	Nominated	
2023	Ninth Annual Screen Nova Scotia Awards	Best Animated Series	Won	
