= Lalo Alcaraz =

American cartoonist (born 1964)

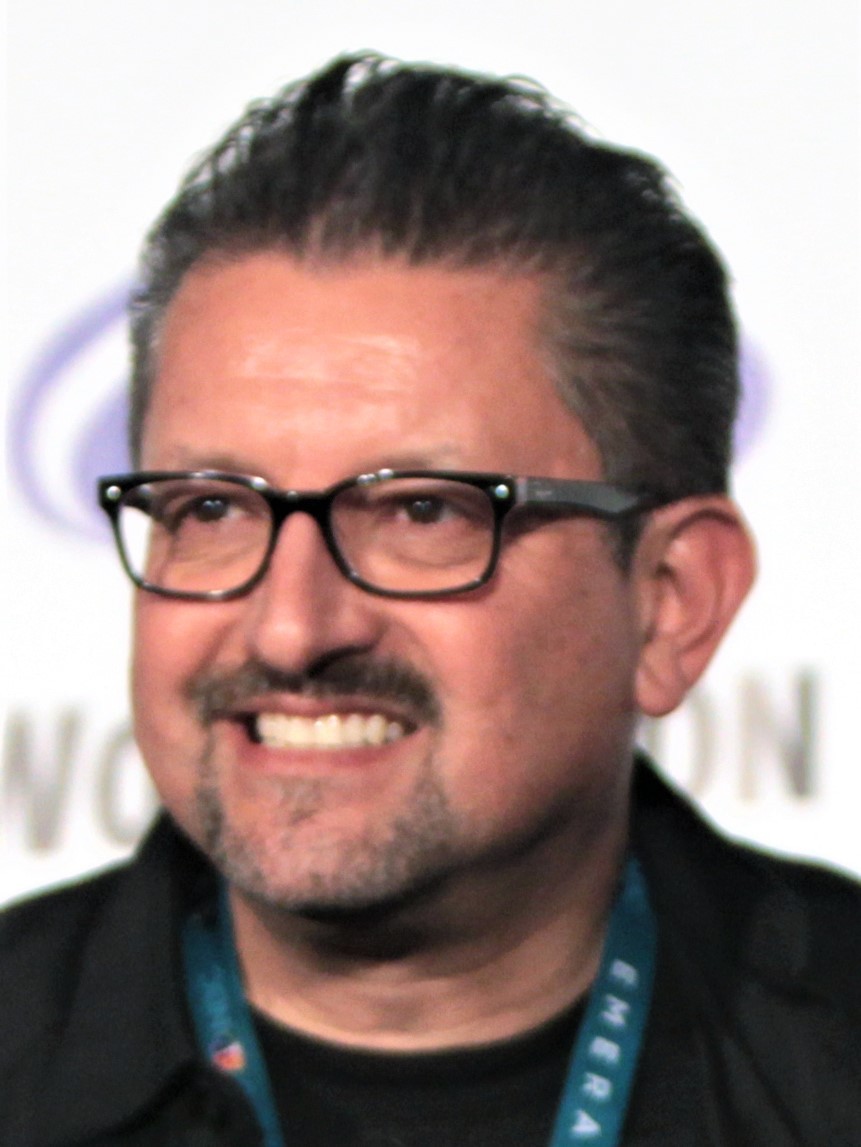
- Alcaraz at WonderCon 2016
- Born: Eduar Lopez Alcaraz; April 19, 1964 (age 62) San Diego, California, U.S.
- Areas: Cartoonist, writer, producer
- Notable works: La Cucaracha

Lalo Alcaraz (born April 19, 1964) is an American cartoonist most known for being the author of the comic La Cucaracha, the first nationally syndicated, politically themed Latino daily comic strip. Launched in 2002, La Cucaracha has become one of the most controversial in the history of American comic strips.

Alcaraz was born in 1964 in San Diego, California, and grew up on the U.S.–Mexico border, giving him a dual outlook on life (not "Mexican" enough for his relatives, not "American" enough for some in the U.S.). He attended San Diego State University, where he received his bachelor's degree "With Distinction" in Art and Environmental Design in 1987. In 1991, Alcaraz earned his master's degree in architecture from the University of California, Berkeley.

A leading figure in the Chicano movement, Alcaraz formerly contributed political cartoons for LA Weekly from 1992 to 2010. He co-hosts a radio show on KPFK called the "Pocho Hour of Power". Alcaraz is also the "Jefe-in-Chief" of POCHO.COM, a website specializing in "Ñews y Satire."

== Career ==
In addition to the daily strip, Alcaraz has published four books. Alcaraz is also an active speaker on the college circuit. He is represented by The Agency Group in Los Angeles.

Alcaraz taught as a faculty member at Otis College of Art & Design. He serves on the editorial advisory board of the Latin American and Latinx literature, philosophy, and arts journal Chiricú Journal: Latina/o Literatures, Arts, and Cultures.

Alcaraz was consulting producer and writer on the animated show Bordertown (created by Family Guy show runner Mark Hentemann and executive produced by Seth MacFarlane), which ran one 13-episode season on Fox. It featured the first animated Mexican-American or even Latino family on primetime American television. He also served along with Gustavo Arellano as producer on comedian Al Madrigal's TV special for Fusion, Half Like Me. In 2015, Pixar hired Alcaraz to consult on Coco. (See "§ Activism" below.) He is also a TV animation producer and consultant on The Casagrandes on Nickelodeon. Alcaraz is also a performer, voicing an angry mariachi in Coco, and has portrayed a Mexican bounty hunter named "Royce Vargas" in the 2017 Bill Plympton/Jim Lujan animated feature film Revengeance.

== Activism ==
In response to the Walt Disney corporation's attempt to trademark Día de Los Muertos for the Pixar film set in Mexico, Coco, Alcaraz helped lead a social activist campaign which eventually led to Disney's abandoning the idea. In particular, Alcaraz's "Muerto Mouse" (itself an offshoot of his early "Migra Mouse") criticized the Disney campaign with the byline "It's coming to trademark your cultura."

He is the creator of "Daniel D. Portado", a satirical Hispanic character who in 1994 formed the faux group "Hispanics For Wilson" which called on Mexican immigrants to return south—"reverse immigration"—as a response to the controversial Proposition 187. In 2012, Daniel D. Portado returned to the headlines as a result of Mitt Romney's call, during his campaign for the Republican presidential nomination, on undocumented immigrants to exercise "self-deportation."

He contributed a work of art to the 2008 Obama campaign called "Viva Obama". He worked with The Lincoln Project during the campaign for the 2020 United States presidential election.

== Awards ==
Alcaraz has received five Southern California Journalism Awards for Best Cartoon in Weekly Papers, and numerous other awards and honors, including "The Latino Spirit Award" from the California Legislature and the Office of the Lt. Governor, honors from the Los Angeles City Council, The California Chicano News Media Association, the UC Berkeley Chicano Latino Alumni Association, the United Farm Workers of America, the Los Angeles County Federation of Labor, the Center for the Study of Political Graphics, and The Rockefeller Foundation.

Pulitzer Prize Finalist

In 2019 and 2020, Alcaraz was a finalist for a Pulitzer Prize.

Herblock Prize

On April 26, 2022, he was awarded the annual Herblock Prize presented by the Herb Block Foundation to honor excellence in editorial cartooning.

== Works ==
- Alcaraz, Lalo (2004). La Cucaracha. Andrews McMeel Publishing. ISBN 978-0740746598.
- Alcaraz, Lalo (2004). Migra Mouse: Political Cartoons on Immigration. Akashic Books. ISBN 978-0971920620.
- Stavans, Ilan (2000). Latino USA: A Cartoon History. Illustrated by Lalo Alcaraz. Basic Books. ISBN 9780465082216.
- Stavans, Ilan (2014). A Most Imperfect Union: A Contrarian History of the United States. Illustrated by Lalo Alcaraz. Basic Books. ISBN 978-0465036691.
- "Fuertes with the 2010 Census" (PDF). Maldef.
