= Sumalee Montano =

American actress

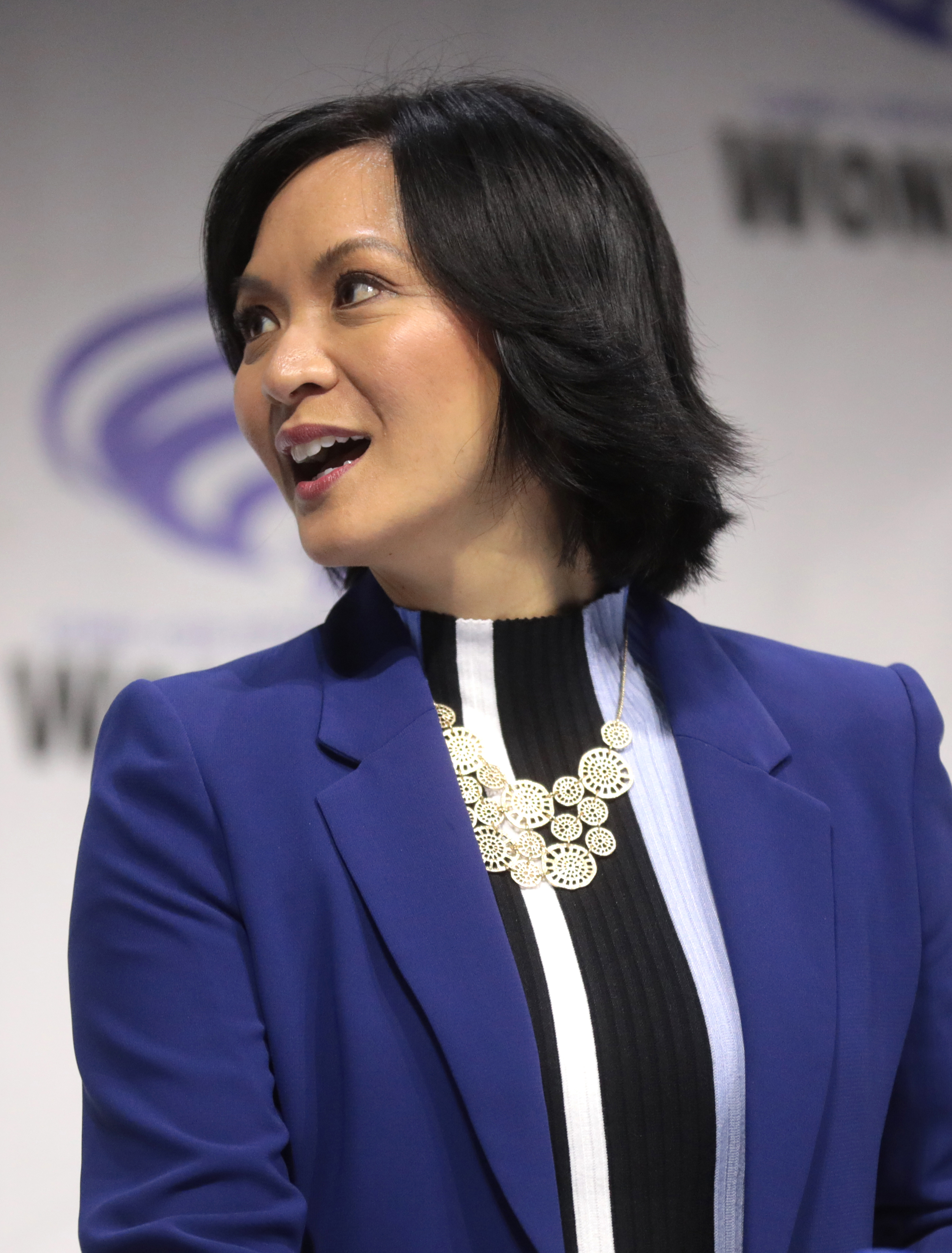
- Montano at the 2019 WonderCon
- Born: Columbus, Ohio, United States
- Education: Harvard University (AB)
- Occupations: Actress; filmmaker
- Years active: 1999–present
- Spouse: Craig Zimmerman (m. 2011)
- Website: sumalee.com

Sumalee Montano is an American actress. Originally, she worked as an investment bank analyst in New York City and Hong Kong before starting her acting career.

For TV and film, Montano has appeared on Close to Home, Days of Our Lives, Nashville, Scandal, The Young and the Restless, This Is Us, and Veep. As a voice actress, she has provided the voice of Pudding in Space Channel 5 and Sonic & All-Stars Racing Transformed, Arcee on Transformers: Prime, Cali in the Skylanders series, Katana on Beware the Batman, the President in Saints Row IV, the female Inquisitor in Dragon Age: Inquisition and Yuna in Ghost of Tsushima and Maria Santiago in The Loud House and The Casagrandes. She has also guest-starred as Nila on the web series Critical Role.

She resides and works in Los Angeles.

== Early life ==
Montano is of Filipino and Thai descent and grew up mostly in the United States, but also spent a few years in Bangkok, Thailand. During her high school career, she began acting as an extracurricular activity. Her great-uncle is Filipino actor and writer Severino Montano.

== Education and acting career ==
She graduated from Harvard University in 1993 and is a U.S. Fulbright scholar. After graduation, she worked as an investment banking analyst for Morgan Stanley for a few years. After realizing investment banking wasn't something she was passionate about, Montano quit and went backpacking through Africa before realizing she wanted to pursue acting professionally.

Montano has taken on a variety of different roles, both live-action and voice-over. She is talented in using many different accents, including Chinese, Filipino, British, Southern, Thai, Vietnamese, Eastern European and Japanese. Her first voice acting role was as Pudding in the 1999 music-rhythm game, Space Channel 5. Her first major acting role was playing the nurse Duvata Mahal for three seasons of the TV show ER.

In 2021, Montano gained acclaim for her role as Inoue Sato in the Peacock TV series The Lost Symbol. Following her portrayal as Sato, she had also appeared in the 2021 animated Disney series The Ghost and Molly McGee, voicing Sharon McGee, the titular character's mother, and Grandma Nin.

== Filmography ==
=== Voice acting ===
==== Video games ====
List of voice performances in video games
Year	Title	Role	Notes	Source
1999	Space Channel 5	Pudding	First console game	
2001	SimCoaster	Additional voices		
2002	Space Channel 5: Part 2	Additional voices/hostages	Archive footage from Part 1, Pudding's dialogue	
2003	The Sims	Sim		
2003	Space Channel 5: Ulala's Cosmic Attack	Pudding		
2003	Star Wars: Knights of the Old Republic	Lashowe, Belaya, Rahasia Sandral, Duel Spectator		
2003	Gladius	Additional Voices		
2003	Space Channel 5: Special Edition	Pudding/additional voices	Disc 2 (Part 2) only includes archive footage	
2006	CSI: 3 Dimensions of Murder	Lucy Canelli, Maya Nguyen		
2007	CSI: Crime Scene Investigation: Hard Evidence	Liz Schmidt, Nicole Simms		
2007	Commander in Chief	Air Force Reporter		
2008	Sega Superstars Tennis	Pudding	Voiced alongside Larissa Murray	
2010	Army of Two: The 40th Day	Mei Lin		
2011	Call of Juarez: The Cartel	Shane Dickson		
2011	Dead Island	Yerema		
2011	X-Men: Destiny	Mystique		
2011	Skylanders: Spyro's Adventure	Cali		
2011	Star Wars: The Old Republic	Shae Vizla		
2012	Mass Effect 3	Nyreen Kandros	Omega DLC	
2012	Diablo III	Eirena the Enchantress		
2012	Guild Wars 2	Janis, Marjory Delaqua, Sayida the Sly		
2012	World of Warcraft: Mists of Pandaria	Liu Flameheart, Suna Silentstrike, Sun Tenderheart		
2012	Skylanders: Giants	Cali		
2012	Transformers: Prime – The Game	Arcee		
2012	Sonic & All-Stars Racing Transformed	Pudding	Voiced alongside Apollo Smile	
2013	Saints Row IV	The President		
2013	Skylanders: Swap Force	Cali		
2013	République	Abal Ammash		
2014	The Elder Scrolls Online	Female Redguard, Female Khajiit #1, Additional Voices		
2014	The Amazing Spider-Man 2	Whitney Chang		
2014	WildStar	Tresayne Toria, Vesna Taranoft, Nuriam		
2014	Skylanders: Trap Team	Cali		
2014	Dragon Age: Inquisition	Female Inquisitor (American Accent)		
2015	Saints Row: Gat out of Hell	The President		
2015	Skylanders: SuperChargers	Cali		
2015	Fallout 4	Rachel, Female Gunners, Institute Scientist		
2015	StarCraft II: Legacy of the Void	Tal'darim Mothership		
2016	XCOM 2	Female Soldier		
2016	Mirror's Edge Catalyst	Erika Connors		
2016	Master of Orion: Conquer the Stars	Terran Advisor		
2016	Lego Dimensions	Bonnie		
2017	For Honor	Ayu		
2017	Guardians of the Galaxy: The Telltale Series	Mantis		
2017	Prey	Morgan Yu (Female), January (Female)		
2017	Destiny 2	Suraya Hawthorne		
2017	Batman: The Enemy Within	Renee Montoya, Casino Patron, Newscaster #2		
2018	Lego DC Super-Villains	Katana, Huntress		
2018	Epic Seven	Aramintha, Maya, Kiris		
2019	Anthem	Aunt Cardea		
2019	Marvel Ultimate Alliance 3: The Black Order	Mystique		
2019	The Outer Worlds	Zora Blackwood		
2019	Star Wars Jedi: Fallen Order	Mari Kosan		
2020	Ghost of Tsushima	Yuna	Also motion capture	
2020	Yakuza: Like a Dragon	Additional voices		
2020	Tom Clancy's Rainbow Six Siege	Aruni	Operation Neon Dawn expansion	
2021	Lost Judgment	Reiko Kusumoto		
2022	Return to Monkey Island	Flair Gorey		
2022	Naraka: Bladepoint	Justina Gu		
2023	Dead Space	Dr. Elizabeth Cross		
2023	Starfield	Supervisor Lin		
2023	Like a Dragon Gaiden: The Man Who Erased His Name	Additional voices		
2024	Like a Dragon: Infinite Wealth	Additional voices		
2026	Yakuza Kiwami 3 & Dark Ties	Additional voices		

==== Film ====
List of voice performances in direct-to-video, feature and television films
Year	Title	Role	Notes	Source
2011	Kung Fu Panda: Secrets of the Masters	the Wu sisters	Short film	
2012	Superman vs. The Elite	Newscaster		
2013	Transformers Prime Beast Hunters: Predacons Rising	Arcee		
2015	Justice League: Throne of Atlantis	Mera		
2016	Only Yesterday	Kiyoko	English dub	
2016	10 Cloverfield Lane	Voice on Radio		
2019	Justice League vs. the Fatal Five	Emerald Empress, Pharmacist		
2021	PAW Patrol: The Movie	Additional Voices (US)		
2022	Mortal Kombat Legends: Snow Blind	Kindra		
2024	The Casagrandes Movie	Maria Santiago		

==== Animation ====
List of voice performances in animation
Year	Title	Role	Notes	Source
2010–2013	Transformers: Prime	Arcee, Raf's Mother	Main role	
2013–2014	Beware the Batman	Katana, additional voices	Main role	
2017	The Loud House	Maria Santiago		
2017	Be Cool, Scooby-Doo!	Arachne, Harpy	Episode: "Greece Is the Word"	
2017–2018	Bunnicula	Fluffy	Episodes: "Vampire Rabbit Season" and "Harold the Vampire Pointer"	
2018	Voltron: Legendary Defender	Admiral Sanda, Principle		
2018–2019	Spider-Man	Yuri Watanabe, Nurse		
2019–2020	Star Wars Resistance	Agent Tierny		
2019	Love, Death & Robots	Young Yan, Woman	Episode: "Good Hunting"	
2019	Kung Fu Panda: The Paws of Destiny	Shi Long	Episode: "Curse of the Monkey King"	
2019	Amphibia	Additional Voices	Episode: "Reunion"	
2019–2022	The Casagrandes	Maria Santiago	Main role	
2019	Cannon Busters	12welve, Additional Voices	English dub	
2019	Carmen Sandiego	Lady Dokuso	2 episodes	
2019	Cleopatra in Space	Administrant Khepra, Musti		
2020	Where's Waldo?	Wizard Flambé	Episode: "Mad About Madagascar"	
2020	DreamWorks Dragons: Rescue Riders	Fanthom	Episode: "Divewings"	
2021	Robot Chicken	Baby Secret, Pinhead's Mother	Episode: "May Cause Lucid Murder Dreams"	
2021–2024	The Ghost and Molly McGee	Sharon McGee, Grandma Nin	Main role	
2022	Dragon Age: Absolution	Hira	Main role	
2023	The Legend of Vox Machina	Highbearer Vord	Episode: "The Trials of Vasselheim"	
2024–2025	Jurassic World: Chaos Theory	The Handler	8 episodes	

=== Live-action ===
==== Television ====
List of acting performances in television
Year	Title	Role	Notes	Source
2002–2005	E.R.	Duvata Mahal	10 episodes	
2003	Strong Medicine	Med Student #2	Episode: "Vaccinations"	
2005	Judging Amy	Helen	Episode: "The New Normal"	
2005	Medium	Nurse #1	Episode: "Penny for Your Thoughts"	
2005	The Comeback	Producer	Episode: "Valerie Stands Out on the Red Carpet"	
2005–2006	The West Wing	Vinick Reporter #1	2 episodes	
2005–2007	Close to Home	Melinda Mallari	6 episodes	
2006	Bones	Alexandra Combs	Episode: "The Graft in the Girl"	
2006	Commander in Chief	Air Force One Reporter	Episode: "Happy Birthday, Madam President"	
2007	Shogunate	Lady Sakato Adachi	Television film	
2007	Cane	Christine Kim	2 episodes	
2007	Lincoln Heights	Nurse Tan	Episode: "The Vision"	
2007	Shark	Arlene Pierce	Episode: "Every Breath You Take"	
2007–2008	The Young and the Restless	Dr. Maya Bagano	5 episodes	
2008	Boston Legal	Dr. Linda Corbin	Episode: "Kill, Baby, Kill!"	
2009	Big Love	Dr. Gowan	Episode: "Empire"	
2009	Nip/Tuck	Dr. Wu	Episode: "Briggitte Reinholt"	
2010	Glory Daze	Kim-Ly Franklin	Episode: "Papa Don't Pre-Game"	
2011	Harry's Law	Dr. Erica Christie	Episode: "In the Ghetto"	
2012	The Finder	Lee Scott	Episode: "Little Green Men"	
2012	NCIS: Los Angeles	Yen Tran	Episode: "The Dragon and the Fairy"	
2012	Parenthood	Malea	Episode: "What to My Wondering Eyes"	
2013	Monday Mornings	Lynne Iverson	Episode: "Wheels Within Wheels"	
2013	Touch	Nurse Liz	2 episodes	
2014–2017	Days of Our Lives	Dr. Yuen, Dr. Ong	3 episodes	
2015	The Mentalist	Susan Nguyen	Episode: "Green Light"	
2015	NCIS: New Orleans	Melanie Pratt	Episode: "Touched by the Sun"	
2015–2016	Nashville	Dr. Kitley	4 episodes	
2016–2017	Veep	Joyce Cafferty	3 episodes	
2016	Rizzoli & Isles	Judge Huang	Episode: "65 Hours"	
2016	Grey's Anatomy	Lena McCallister	Episode: "Catastrophe and the Cure"	
2016	Shameless	Turks	Episode: "Hiraeth"	
2017	NCIS	Nicole Taggart	Episode: "Rendezvous"	
2017	Kevin (Probably) Saves the World	Tracy Haslett	Episode: "Rocky Road"	
2017	Dynasty	Deirde	Episode: "Company Slut"	
2018	Scandal	Maria Campo	4 episodes	
2018	Critical Role	Nila	2 episodes	
2018	Animal Kingdom	Melanie Southards	2 episodes	
2018	This Is Us	Dr. Gail Jasper	3 episodes	
2018–2019	S.W.A.T.	Gwen	3 episodes	
2018	Blue Bloods	Inspector Jane Kimura	Episode: "Trust"	
2018	The Gifted	Dr. Taylor	Episode: "iMprint"	
2019	How to Get Away with Murder	FBI Agent Nancy Bayer	2 episodes	
2019	Magnum P.I.	Judge Majorie Kamaka	Episode: "Murder Is Never Quiet"	
2019	SEAL Team	Agent Susan Craver	Episode: "The Ones You Can't See"	
2019	The Resident	Trish Tintoc	Episode: "Out for Blood"	
2020	Star Trek: Picard	Dahj and Soji's Mother	Episode: "Remembrance"	
2020	Hawaii Five-0	Yang	Episode: "He kauwa ke kanaka na ke aloha"	
2021	The Lost Symbol	Inoue Sato	Main role	
2024	Snowpiercer	Kari Chang	Recurring	
2025	The Residence	Danna Hammond	Recurring	
2026	Happy's Place	Money Fairy	season 2 episode 16 "AI-AI-No"	

==== Film ====
List of acting performances in films
Year	Title	Role	Notes	Source
2002	Teknolust	Nelia	Uncredited	
2002	Cherish	Officer Montano		
2002	Minority Report	Talking Billboard	Uncredited	
2003	Water Under the Bridge	Sara		
2006	Danika	News Reporter		
2008	Hancock	News Anchor	Uncredited	
2009	Eating Out: All You Can Eat	Pam		
2011	Losing Control	Breanna Lee		
