= It Ends with Us controversy =

Blake Lively-Justin Baldoni dispute since 2024

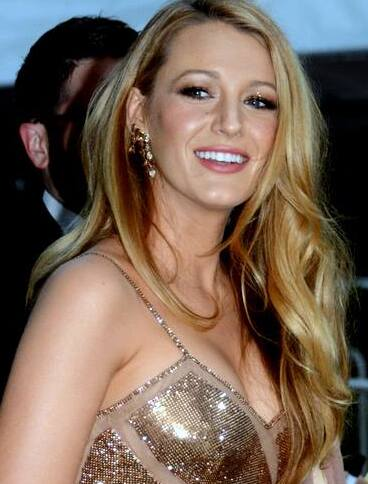
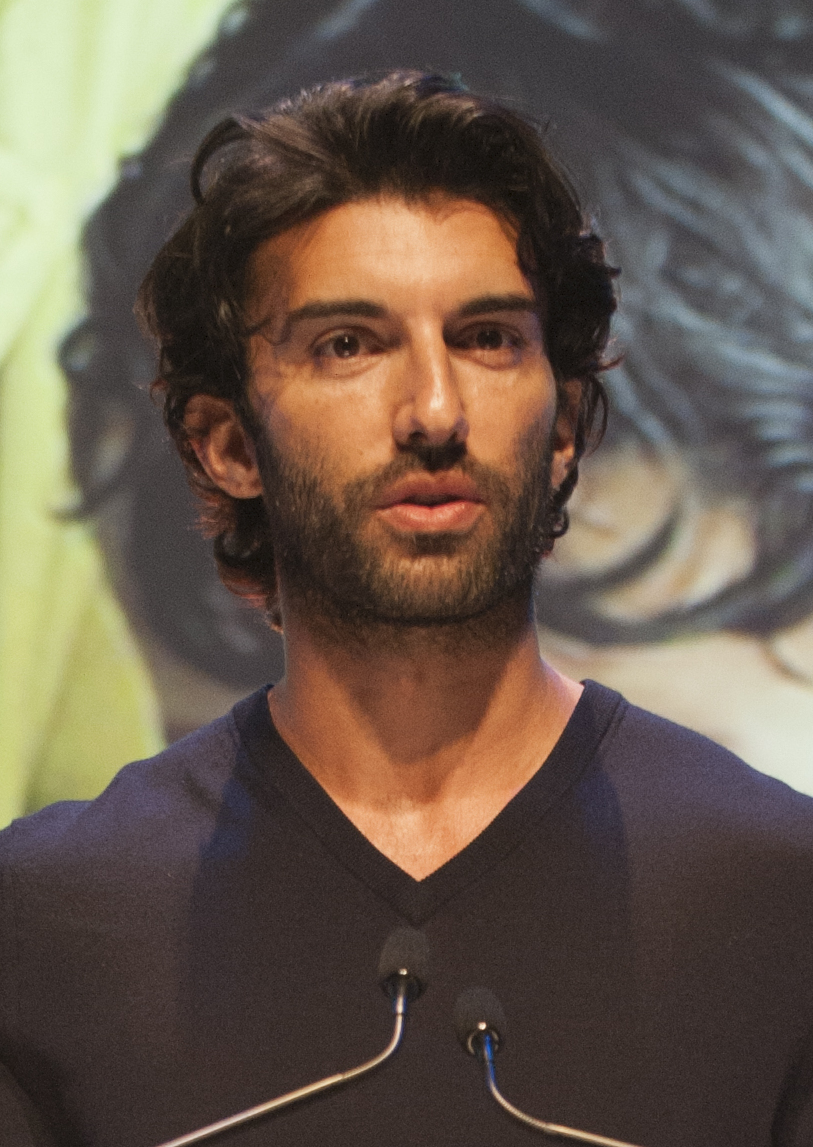
American actress Blake Lively (left; pictured in 2016) and actor Justin Baldoni (right; in 2017)

The production of the 2024 American film It Ends with Us, starring actors Blake Lively and Justin Baldoni, was the subject of controversy due to highly publicized disputes and litigation between Lively and Baldoni concerning allegations of a hostile work environment and smear campaigns. The film, based on the 2016 novel of the same name by the author Colleen Hoover, was directed by Baldoni and produced by Baldoni and Lively, among others. It was released in August 2024 to commercial success.

During the film's press tour, some fans criticized Lively's lighthearted tone in interviews when discussing the story's themes of domestic violence and emotional abuse. Media outlets and tabloids reported an apparent conflict within the cast, with observers noting Baldoni's reduced presence in promotional activities. Reports also included allegations of improper behavior by Baldoni on set, while Lively was accused of creatively undermining Baldoni. In December 2024, Lively filed a complaint with the California Civil Rights Department, alleging that Baldoni created a hostile workplace through inappropriate comments. This was followed by an article in The New York Times that accused Baldoni of hiring a public relations (PR) team to damage Lively's public image in response to her complaints. Lively subsequently filed a federal lawsuit against Baldoni and his associates, alleging violations of U.S. federal and California state law including retaliating against her for reporting sexual harassment and workplace safety concerns. She later added PR consultant Jed Wallace.

Baldoni denied the allegations and alleged that disputes between the parties stemmed from creative disagreements rather than misconduct. He filed a $250 million defamation lawsuit against The New York Times, and in January 2025, filed a $400 million countersuit against Lively, her husband Ryan Reynolds, and their publicist Leslie Sloane, alleging extortion, defamation, and invasion of privacy. Baldoni claimed that Lively used false allegations of sexual harassment and threats to withdraw from the production to gain creative control over the film. The suits alleged that any negative press she received was an organic result of her own behavior during the promotional tour. In February 2025, Lively sought a gag order against Baldoni's attorney, alleging an ongoing smear campaign. The request was denied by the United States District Court for the Southern District of New York.

In May 2025, after Lively included singer-songwriter Taylor Swift on a list of potential witnesses, Baldoni sought to subpoena Swift, alleging that Lively and Reynolds had used her influence to coerce him into accepting Lively's rewrite of a scene in the film. He alleged that Lively blackmailed Swift by leaking private text messages to garner her public support in the controversy. Swift denied involvement in the production, and the subpoena was later withdrawn following criticism from the court. In June 2025, the court dismissed Baldoni's claims against Lively, Reynolds, Sloane and The New York Times, but granted him access to Lively's text conversations with Swift. Lively also sought subpoenas, including requests involving content creators, journalists, media proprietor Scooter Braun and entertainment company Hybe America, alleging association with Baldoni's PR. Her claims against Baldoni's PR consultant Jed Wallace were dismissed in November 2025. In January 2026, a number of exhibits were unsealed ahead of a summary judgment hearing. It included Lively–Swift text messages, communications between Reynolds, his WME agents, with Sony, and multiple deposition excerpts. The testimonies included accounts from co‑star Jenny Slate and other cast and crew, alongside Baldoni's publicists.

In April 2026, the court dismissed 10 of Lively's 13 claims, including sexual harassment, on jurisdictional grounds, effectively removing Baldoni and the other individual defendants from the lawsuit. Lively's remaining claims of retaliation and breach of contract against Wayfarer Studios, as well as aiding and abetting retaliation against associated PR defendants, were resolved out of court in May 2026 without any monetary settlement. Lively continued seeking punitive and treble damages regarding Baldoni's dismissed countersuit. The court awarded Lively attorneys' fees incurred from defense against the defamation claim but denied the sought damages. In June 2026, the terms of the settlement were made public, revealing that all parties waived their rights to any future litigation, bringing the legal dispute between Lively and Baldoni to an end.

== Background ==
It Ends with Us is a 2016 romance novel written by the American author Colleen Hoover. The book's main character is florist Lily Bloom who enters into a relationship with neurosurgeon Ryle Kincaid that becomes abusive over time. A chance encounter with her childhood friend and first love, Atlas Corrigan, inspires Lily to see another way of life. The story, inspired in part by Hoover's parents' relationship, explores themes of domestic violence and emotional trauma.

It Ends with Us has been translated into more than 20 languages other than English and had sold over a million copies worldwide by 2019. It was voted the best romance novel of 2016 by Goodreads. In 2021, the novel experienced a surge in popularity due to attention on BookTok. In 2022, It Ends with Us topped The New York Times Best Seller list and the Publishers Weekly annual list. It subsequently became the best-selling novel of 2023, and Hoover's most popular work.

In July 2019, the American actor and director Justin Baldoni announced on Instagram that he had acquired the film rights to adapt the novel through his company, Wayfarer Studios. In January 2023, it was announced that American actress Blake Lively was cast in the role of Lily Bloom. Baldoni was cast as Ryle Kincaid at Hoover's suggestion. Actors Brandon Sklenar, Jenny Slate, and Hasan Minhaj later joined the cast. Principal photography began in Hoboken, New Jersey, in May 2023. Production was temporarily halted due to the 2023 Writers Guild of America (WGA) and SAG-AFTRA strikes, before resuming in January 2024 in Jersey City.

Early photographs from set sparked criticism from fans with some questioning the film's direction. Lively's outfits particularly were described as "chaotic" and "disheveled, almost-frumpy". Some also expressed concern that Lively was too old to play Lily, who is in her early 20s in the book. Hoover later blamed her own ignorance and explained that the characters in the book are too young for their life experiences, and that the film is a more realistic portrayal. The film's trailer was released on May 16, 2024, featuring the song "My Tears Ricochet" by the American singer-songwriter Taylor Swift, a close friend of Lively's. The film was released on August 9, 2024, achieving commercial success despite mixed reviews, marking both Baldoni and Lively's highest-grossing project yet.

Lively was one of the producers of the film. In an interview with People in April 2024, Baldoni said there "wasn't a part of this production that [Lively] didn't touch and have influence on [...] Everything that she put her hands on and her mind to, she made better." Lively later confirmed this in an interview with Variety, saying "The work I did as a producer was far more all-consuming than anything I did playing Lily. I just did it all. There's nothing I didn't touch on this film."

== Reports of conflict ==
=== Press tour ===
During the film's 2024 promotional campaign, media outlets reported an apparent "feud" between Baldoni and other members of the cast. Baldoni conducted interviews separately and was largely absent from group promotional appearances. Baldoni spoke to Access Hollywood, Today, Entertainment Tonight and Good Morning America, while Lively spoke to Vogue, Capital FM and CBS Mornings. Observers noted that he did not appear alongside Lively in interviews, and other cast members often avoided addressing questions about him. Multiple viewers described Lively's answer to a question on a Yahoo! Entertainment interview about building trust with Baldoni as "wild" as she did not mention him at all.

Social media discourse surrounding Lively became increasingly negative during this period. She faced criticism for her tone during interviews, with some viewers accusing her of treating the film's themes of domestic violence and emotional abuse too lightly. Critics pointed to comments encouraging audiences to attend screenings in a celebratory manner urging them to "grab your friends and wear your florals" to the theater. She was also criticized for promoting her personal brands during the press tour, particularly for tying her alcohol brand to the promotion of a film centered on domestic violence, an issue that is often linked to alcoholism. Additionally, she directed her husband Reynolds in a lighthearted promotional video for It Ends with Us that cross-promoted his film Deadpool & Wolverine. Other criticisms arose from Lively's promotion of her hair care line during the press tour, which some viewed as inappropriate given the film's subject matter. Lively specifically received backlash for what many observers described as a "tone deaf" response to a journalist's question about how survivors of domestic violence might best approach her to discuss the film's themes. In contrast, some observers viewed Baldoni's promotional approach as placing greater emphasis on raising awareness of domestic violence and highlighting survivor experiences.

=== Premiere ===
Speculation about tensions intensified at the film's New York premiere on August 6, 2024. Lively appeared on the red carpet with co-stars, while Baldoni attended separately with his friends and family and did not pose with the main cast. At the premiere, Baldoni told Entertainment Tonight that he likely would not direct the film's potential sequel based on Hoover's follow-up novel, It Starts with Us (2022), and added "I think Blake Lively's ready to direct, that's what I think." When Lively arrived on the red carpet, Baldoni's group was ushered into the basement of the building and placed in a smaller theater to watch the film instead of the main theater with cast. He also did not introduce the film in the main theater prior to the screening, a role typically performed by the director. Lively and Hoover introduced the film instead. According to Baldoni's complaint, Lively and Reynolds had demanded Baldoni not attend the premiere at all.

On the red carpet, Lively disclosed to E! News that her husband, Canadian-American actor Ryan Reynolds, wrote a scene that is a fan-favorite from the book despite not being credited as a writer on the film, sparking fan speculation about whether there were disputes with Baldoni over creative control. Further speculation arose when fans observed that several cast members and Hoover were not following or had unfollowed Baldoni on Instagram. Canadian journalist Liz Plank, a friend of Baldoni and also his co-host of the podcast Man Enough, attended the premiere and posted about it to her Instagram but did not pose with Baldoni or mention him in any of her posts.

On August 8, 2024, The Hollywood Reporter reported that during the film's post-production process, Lively commissioned her own edit of the film from the American film editor Shane Reid, who had edited the Marvel Studios film Deadpool & Wolverine starring and produced by Lively's husband Reynolds, which was slated for release around the same time as It Ends with Us. Reynolds and Lively used the press tour and premiere as an opportunity to cross-promote their projects. Australian-British actor Hugh Jackman, Reynolds's co-star in Deadpool & Wolverine, also attended the It Ends with Us premiere, posing with Reynolds and Lively.

=== Social media traction ===
The alleged conflict gained traction on social media platforms, particularly TikTok, where videos discussing the situation garnered significant attention following the film's release. Speculation among fans and social media users that Reynolds and Lively may have seized creative control of the film from Baldoni increased. Critics posted unflattering comments about Lively's character and highlighted past controversies involving Lively including a video posted by Norwegian journalist Kjersti Flaa titled "The Blake Lively interview that made me want to quit my job" which recounted a negative interaction with the actress, and the resurfacing of other interviews where Lively used the word "trannies" during her Gossip Girl days. Additional criticism came from Domestic Violence survivors who expressed disappointment that Lively's promotion seemed to trivialize domestic abuse and failed to prepare them for the film's heavy subject matter. Negative online discourse also emerged after it was reported that a themed cocktail called "Ryle You Wait" was served at the premiere afterparty, which some interpreted as making light of an abusive character.

On August 13, 2024, it was reported that Baldoni had hired crisis PR manager Melissa Nathan of The Agency Group (TAG). Nathan previously worked at Hiltzik Srategies, whose clients included the American actor Johnny Depp during his legal disputes with the American actress Amber Heard in Depp v. Heard and Depp v News Group Newspapers Ltd. On August 14, the tabloid Page Six published claims that Baldoni made Lively upset when she heard he asked her trainer how much she weighed before shooting a scene in which he had to lift her, as he had a history of back pain. Lively had recently given birth when she began working on It Ends with Us and was reportedly uneasy with her weight.

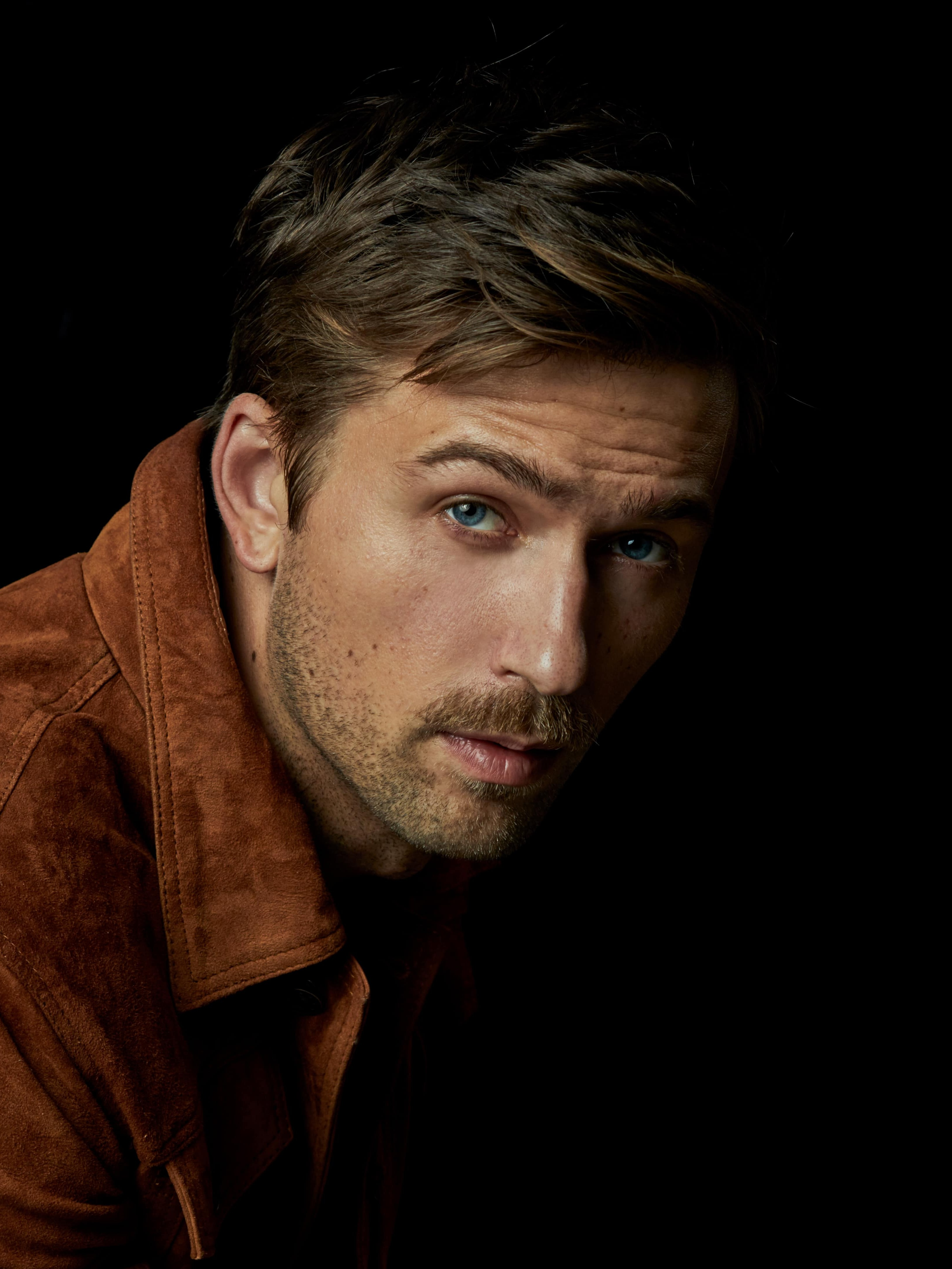
Co-lead Brandon Sklenar supported Lively in the dispute.

On August 20, Sklenar became the first cast member to directly address the feud allegations. He wrote on Instagram, "Vilifying the women who put so much of their heart and soul into making this film because they believe so strongly in its message seems counterproductive and detracts from what this film is about.... What may or may not have happened behind the scenes does not and hopefully should not detract from what our intentions were in making this film." Sklenar asked fans not to direct negativity toward his female colleagues, and tagged all the female cast members, including Lively, in the post, and did not tag Baldoni.

== Complaint and The New York Times article ==
On December 20, 2024, Lively filed a complaint with the California Civil Rights Department, alleging Baldoni created a hostile work environment through inappropriate conduct, including alleged sexual harassment and boundary violations, such as improvising kissing during filming of romantic scenes. The complaint also accused Baldoni of embarking on a "social manipulation" campaign to "destroy" Lively's reputation, which she says harmed her business and caused "severe emotional distress." On December 21, the tabloid TMZ claimed that the complaint mentioned that Lively and Reynolds held a meeting at their home before filming restarted to address Lively's concerns. Lively claims she came to the meeting with a list of demands regarding Baldoni's alleged behavior, including "no more adding of sex scenes, oral sex, or on-camera climaxing by [Lively] outside the scope of the script [Lively] approved when signing onto the project." Baldoni refuted many of her claims at the meeting and denied ever seeing the more serious allegations. In a statement to TMZ, responding to the accusations, Baldoni's attorney Bryan Freedman alleged that Lively's complaint is an attempt at fixing her "negative reputation", describing her accusations as "false, outrageous, and intentionally salacious with an intent to publicly hurt." On the issues during production, Freedman accused Lively of "threatening to not show up to set, threatening to not promote the film, ultimately leading to its demise during release."

Hours after the TMZ news, The New York Times published an investigative report written by Megan Twohey, Mike McIntire and Julie Tate that detailed Lively's allegations in court documents, titled " 'We Can Bury Anyone': Inside a Hollywood Smear Machine". The article reported on Lively's allegations that Baldoni hired a PR crisis management team after she confronted him about alleged harassment. Documents obtained by Lively via subpoena alleged that there was a coordinated effort on Baldoni's behalf to discredit her across both traditional and social media. The paper quoted Lively's claims, "Baldoni had improvised unwanted kissing and discussed his sex life, including encounters in which he said he may not have received consent" and "repeatedly entered [Lively's] makeup trailer uninvited while she was undressed, including when she was breastfeeding." Prior to the recommencement of filming after the 2023 WGA and SAG strikes, Wayfarer Studios had agreed to implement safeguards including providing a full-time intimacy coordinator and bringing in an outside producer. The Hollywood Reporter and Rolling Stone magazine reported that Lively and Reynolds's demands to Wayfarer Studios included "not showing nude videos or images of women to Lively; no more mentions of Baldoni's alleged previous 'pornography addiction'; no more discussions about sexual experiences in front of Lively and others; no further mentions of genitalia; and no more inquiries about Lively's weight." Nathan had also reportedly sent a text to Baldoni's publicist saying "You know we can bury anyone."

Baldoni denied the allegations and insisted that The New York Times reporting was misleading. In a statement to The Times, his attorney Brian Freedman claimed that Lively planted "negative and completely fabricated and false stories with media" about Baldoni to ruin his reputation, which "was another reason why Wayfarer Studios made the decision to hire a crisis professional." He said that Wayfarer "did nothing proactive nor retaliated" against Lively. Freedman maintained that the claims were "completely false" and also suggested the text messages shared with The New York Times were "cherry-picked" to make his clients look unfavorable. According to Freedman, the text messages have been presented out of context in a way that alters their meaning; he also stated that he has "never seen this level of unethical behavior intentionally fueled through media manipulation."

=== Fallout ===
- Immediately after The New York Times article, the American talent agency WME dropped Baldoni as a client. Ari Emanuel, the executive chairman of WME Group, explained that he fired Baldoni because he is "ride or die" for Reynolds and Lively.
- Hoover, Slate and Sklenar spoke in support of Lively. American actresses Amber Tamblyn, America Ferrera, and Alexis Bledel (who all co-starred with Lively in the Sisterhood of the Traveling Pants film series), released a joint statement in support of Lively. Amber Heard also supported Lively, saying "Social media is the absolute personification of the classic saying 'A lie travels halfway around the world before truth can get its boots on.' I saw this firsthand and up close. It's as horrifying as it is destructive."
- The American actors' labor union SAG-AFTRA expressed support for Lively, releasing a statement that read in part, "We applaud [her] courage in speaking out on issues of retaliation and harassment and for her request to have an intimacy coordinator for all scenes with nudity or sexual content. This is an important step that helps ensure a safe set."
- On December 9, Minhaj had presented Baldoni with the 2024 Voices of Solidarity Award from the American non-profit organization Vital Voices, which "honors remarkable men who have shown courage and compassion in advocating on behalf of women and girls worldwide." On December 23, Vital Voice rescinded the award, explaining that their decision was based on reported communications between Baldoni and his publicists, which were published by The New York Times.
- Plank, Baldoni's co-host on Man Enough, resigned from the podcast following Lively's allegations.
- Sony Pictures released a statement in support of Lively, adding, "We strongly condemn any reputational attacks on her. Any such attacks have no place in our business or in a civil society."
- In April 2025, as a result of Lively's lawsuit, Wayfarer Studios financier Steve Sarowitz was targeted by a man who set a fire at his home and repeatedly threatened to kidnap his daughter via text, demanding money in exchange for his daughter's safety. Sarowitz subsequently hired 24/7 security.
- After the threat to his family, in May 2025 Sarowitz shut down Wayfarer Foundation, his charitable organization that funded hundreds of nonprofits.

== Lawsuits ==
Multiple lawsuits arising from the It Ends with Us production dispute were filed across several jurisdictions beginning in December 2024. The litigation primarily involved Blake Lively and Justin Baldoni, but expanded to include media organizations, public relations representatives, and third parties. Baldoni and Lively sued each other in the District Court for the Southern District of New York, in or around January 2025. Baldoni also sued The New York Times, separately in Los Angeles before adding them as co-defendants in his New York case against Lively, Reynolds and Lively's publicist Leslie Sloane. Baldoni's lawsuit against the Lively parties and The New York Times was dismissed in June 2025. In April 2026, the majority of Lively's lawsuit against Baldoni and his associates was dismissed. Lively's narrowed set of claims were set for trial on May 18, but two weeks before trial was to begin, Lively withdrew her remaining claims and settled her case.

=== Stephanie Jones lawsuits ===
On December 24, 2024, after the release of the New York Times article, Stephanie Jones, Baldoni's former publicist, filed a lawsuit in New York City against Baldoni, former employee Jennifer Abel, crisis publicist Melissa Nathan, and Baldoni's company, Wayfarer Studios, alleging breach of contract and defamation, and seeking unspecified damages. Jones claimed she stopped representing Baldoni and Wayfarer Studios due to concerns that Lively would publicly reveal misconduct allegations. The lawsuit alleges that Abel and Nathan conspired for months to undermine Jones and her public relations firm Jonesworks by poaching clients and prospects while blaming her for their smear campaign. The complaint cited internal text messages and emails obtained from Abel's company-issued device.

Baldoni, Abel and Nathan denied the accusations. In March 2025, Baldoni and Abel countersued alleging that Jones wrongfully shared Abel's private text messages with Lively and her publicist Leslie Sloane. They claim that after Jones was fired by Baldoni in August 2024 for allegedly violating instructions by talking to the press, Jones knowingly made false claims to Lively's publicist Sloane about a coordinated effort to destroy Lively's reputation, and later turned over a cache of Abel's internal communications to Sloane using what was described as a "sham" subpoena as cover. The complaint stated that just hours after Abel's work phone was seized by Jones, Sloane called Nathan and informed her that Sloane had seen Nathan's text messages, which could only have come from Abel's phone, and that Nathan should expect to be sued. In March 2026, the court rejected Jones's efforts to dismiss the case against her. The judge allowed their defamation claim to proceed with the allegation that she knowingly fed Lively's team a false narrative.

=== Baldoni v. The New York Times ===
In December 2024, Baldoni filed a libel lawsuit for $250 million against The New York Times in the Los Angeles County Superior Court accusing it of pushing an "unverified and self-serving narrative" using "cherry-picked and altered communications stripped of necessary context," and allegedly ignoring evidence disputing Lively's claims. Baldoni's lawyer stated, "In this vicious smear campaign fully orchestrated by Lively and her team, The New York Times cowered to the wants and whims of two powerful 'untouchable' Hollywood elites, disregarding journalistic practices and ethics once befitting of the revered publication by using doctored and manipulated texts and intentionally omitting texts which dispute their chosen PR narrative." They alleged that The Times story omits contemporaneous text messages where Baldoni's public relations team denies involvement in any negative press against Lively.

The New York Times defended its actions, stating "The role of an independent news organization is to follow the facts where they lead. Our story was meticulously and responsibly reported. It was based on a review of thousands of pages of original documents, including the text messages and emails that we quote accurately and at length in the article. To date, Wayfarer Studios, Mr. Baldoni, the other subjects of the article and their representatives have not pointed to a single error. We published their full statement in response to the allegations in the article as well. We plan to vigorously defend against the lawsuit." This case would be dismissed by Baldoni in January 2025 when he added The New York Times as a party to his lawsuit in New York City.

=== Lively v. Wayfarer Studios et al ===
Lively filed a federal lawsuit against Baldoni on December 31, 2024, addressing the same issues she had raised in her complaint to the California Civil Rights Department. Lively's representatives directly addressed this being a response to Baldoni's lawsuit, saying, "This lawsuit is based on the obviously false premise that Ms. Lively's administrative complaint against Wayfarer and others was a ruse based on a choice 'not to file a lawsuit against Baldoni, Wayfarer,' and that 'litigation was never her ultimate goal.' As demonstrated by the federal complaint filed by Ms. Lively earlier today, that frame of reference for the Wayfarer lawsuit is false. While we will not litigate this matter in the press, we do encourage people to read Ms. Lively's complaint in its entirety. We look forward to addressing each and every one of Wayfarer's allegations in court."

Lively's lawsuit alleges that Baldoni and his public relations team orchestrated a sophisticated, multi-tiered campaign to damage her reputation in retaliation for speaking out about sexual misconduct on the film's set. The complaint names Baldoni, his film studio, Wayfarer, Wayfarer president Jamey Heath, Wayfarer co-founder Steve Sarowitz, public relations representatives Melissa Nathan and Jennifer Abel, and Melissa Nathan's PR agency The Agency Group PR (TAG). Lively's legal team claimed that Wayfarer and its associates violated federal and California state law by retaliating against her after she reported sexual harassment and workplace safety concerns. The statement also accused Baldoni of initiating unwelcome physical advances, asserting that when Lively or others avoided his touch, both Baldoni and Heath retaliated by becoming irritated, cold, and uncooperative. Lively claimed she was forced to work in an "unwelcoming and volatile environment". Sarowitz denied involvement with the film other than providing funding, visiting the set twice and was not involved in the PR.

On February 9, 2025, Lively filed a 163-page amended complaint in New York, updating her initial complaint as well as "a new claim for defamation." Lively's lawyers alleged that it "provides significant additional evidence and corroboration of her original claims" and "includes previously undisclosed communications" involving Lively, Sony, Wayfarer Studios and "numerous other witnesses." A spokesperson for Lively said that the new filing "details the corroboration that backs up Blake's original sexual harassment and retaliation concerns" and that "other women confided in Blake about their discomfort and fear of coming forward, and their concern about the current public vitriol."

Freedman responded in a statement obtained by People, calling the amended complaint "underwhelming" and alleging that it was "filled with unsubstantial hearsay of unnamed persons who are clearly no longer willing to come forward or publicly support her claims." He states his clients "have been transparent in providing receipts, real time documents and video showing a completely different story than what has been manipulated and cherry picked to the media." In March 2025, Lively hired Nick Shapiro, former CIA chief of staff and Obama administration communications director, as crisis PR strategist for the legal dispute.

On August 8, judge Lewis J. Liman granted Lively's motion to strike her deposition from court records, writing that the defendants' attachment of the nearly 300-page deposition and then citing only two pages "served no proper litigation purpose and instead appears to have been intended to burden Lively (and as a result, the Court) and to invite public speculation and scandal". On October 22, Lively's lawyers accused the defendants of using auto-deletion functions on the Signal messaging service to destroy or fail to preserve their communications in 2024, prior to the lawsuit, about the alleged campaign against Lively.

On April 2, 2026, Judge Liman dismissed 10 out of 13 of Lively's claims, including her sexual harassment claims against Baldoni. The judge found that the alleged sexual harassment occurred primarily in New Jersey, where the picture was shot, and on that basis dismissed her sexual harassment claim brought under California law. However, the court allowed Lively to proceed with her retaliation claims under California law, concluding that the defendants had allegedly orchestrated a "smear campaign" against her from California. Additionally, as an independent contractor, Lively was not entitled to bring sexual harassment claims under Title VII of the Civil Rights Act of 1964, the law that prohibits employment discrimination on various grounds, including gender. He also found that several of her allegations failed to meet the bar for gender-based hostile work environment, explaining, "Creative artists, no less than comedy room writers, must have some amount of space to experiment within the bounds of an agreed script without fear of being held liable for sexual harassment."

On May 4, 2026, exactly two weeks before the trial was to begin, Lively and Wayfarer settled out of court with Lively voluntarily dismissing her remaining claims. On June 15, the terms of the settlement were made public, revealing that it bars any future claims related to the dispute, marking a definitive conclusion to the litigation.

==== Unsealing of exhibits from discovery ====
In January 2026, the United States District Court for the SDNY ordered hundreds of exhibits in Lively v. Wayfarer et al to be unsealed, making previously confidential text messages, emails, voice messages, and deposition excerpts part of the public record. Unsealed messages among executives at Sony Pictures indicated that, despite the studio's public support for Lively, some executives privately criticized her conduct, with one referring to her as a "f—ing terrorist".

Unsealed court filings included text messages and emails attributed to Lively's husband Ryan Reynolds, in which he expressed hostility toward Justin Baldoni. Reynolds also expressed ire for two senior executives involved in the production calling them "textbook, ineffectual elderly people with no ideas or thoughtful communication skills. Just blunt instruments with six catchphrases and about 5 key words." Communications show that Reynolds enlisted the help of both his talent agent and the then executive chairman of WME parent company Endeavor to advocate for Lively against Baldoni. Through his agent, he requested that WME co-founder Ari Emanuel go "full Ari" on Baldoni referencing Emanuel's notorious aggression. He also texted his agent that his publicist Leslie Sloane "should definitely engage the studio and fight back in any way necessary." Further communications revealed that Reynolds wrote a statement that he demanded Baldoni and Heath release accepting the blame for Lively's bad press, which they declined to do.

Among the unsealed exhibits were text messages between Lively and singer Taylor Swift. Although Swift's representatives stated that she had no involvement in the film's production or creative decisions, one message described how she encouraged Baldoni to accept Lively's rewrite of the film by "making shit up" about Lively that would impress Baldoni. The messages also featured an exchange where Swift and Lively strategized about using Swift's song in the trailer. Swift texted Lively, "If Justin was strategic [then] he would be like no Taylor Swift in the trailer... Because that gives you more power over the film. That's your ally not his". Lively added "How stupid. This was his only shot at having the appearance of an upper hand."

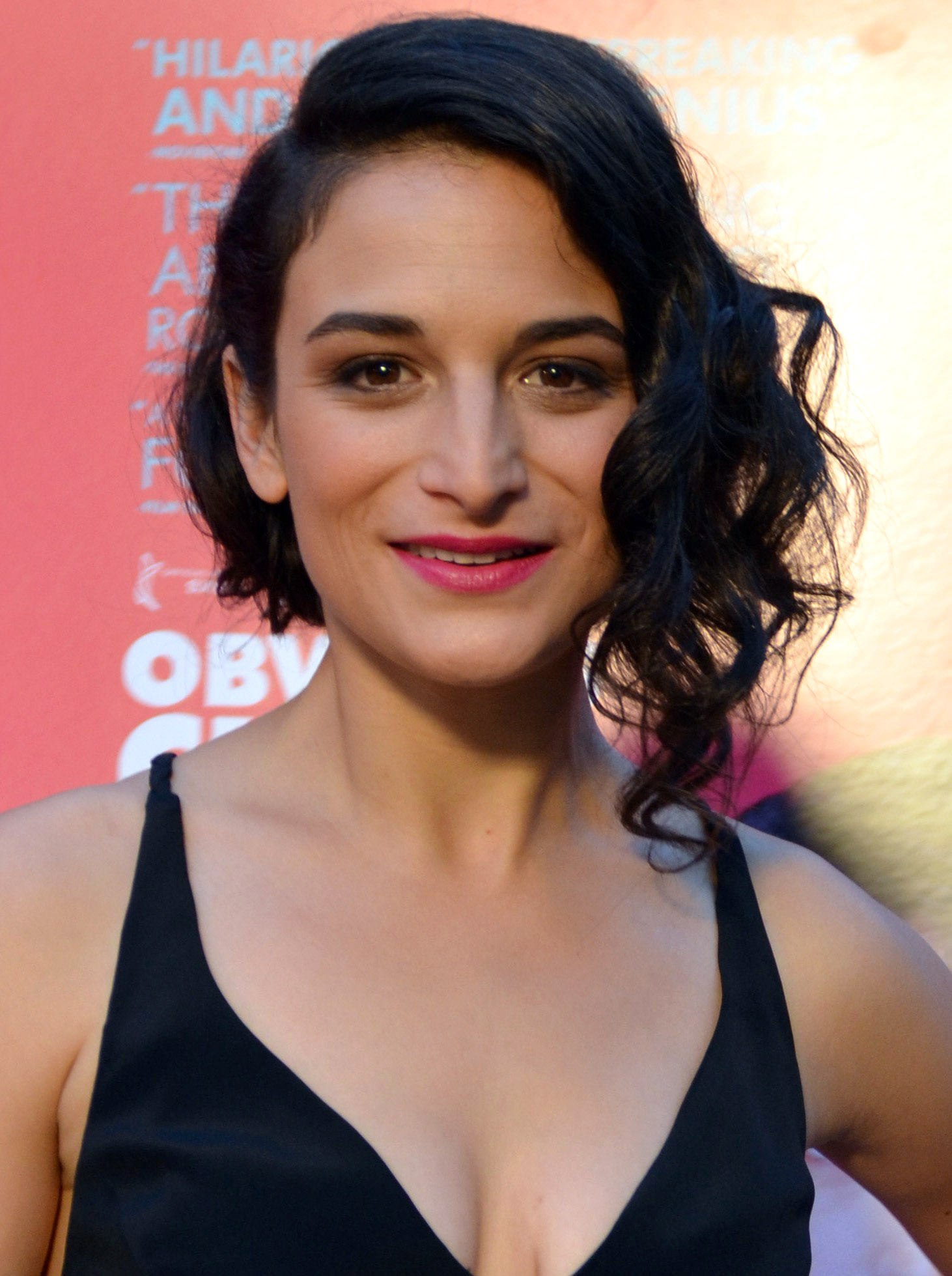
It Ends with Us co-star Jenny Slate accused Baldoni of pretending to be a feminist in her deposition on September 26, 2025, and described her filming experience with him as "gross and disturbing".

Texts and emails revealed that Lively and Reynolds contacted actors Ben Affleck and Matt Damon seeking input on her cut of It Ends with Us. In the messages, Lively disparaged Baldoni and repeatedly referred to his religion as a cult. Unsealed exhibits revealed that Jenny Slate reached out to Lively to discuss a remark she made in front of Lively and Baldoni where she referenced the small bed in her apartment as being "bad for sex". Slate also shared that the apartment was not safe for her child, to which Heath offered her $15,000 to reimburse her security deposit so she could move. It was revealed in the unsealed exhibits that the offer upset her due to his focus on the sanctity of motherhood.

=== Baldoni's countersuit against Lively, Reynolds, Sloane and The New York Times ===
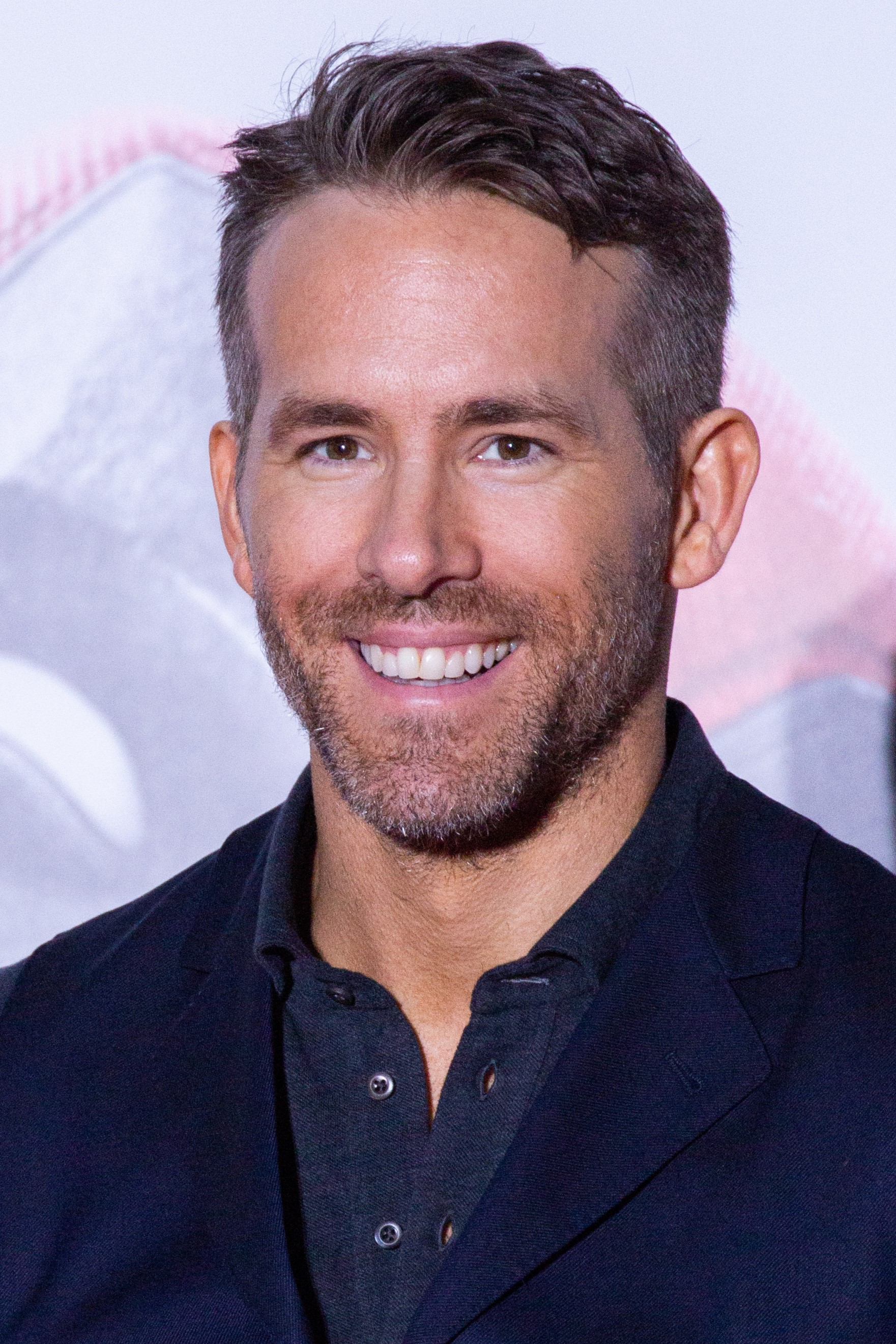
Baldoni also named Canadian-American actor Ryan Reynolds, Lively's husband, as a co-defendant in his lawsuit against Lively.

In reaction to Lively's lawsuit, Baldoni's attorney, Bryan Freedman, told NBC on January 3, 2025, that Baldoni intended to countersue Lively. On January 16, 2025, Baldoni's attorney filed a $400 million lawsuit against Lively, Ryan Reynolds, their publicist Leslie Sloane, and Sloane's company for civil extortion, defamation, and invasion of privacy. The 179-page complaint, filed in the Southern District of New York, claims that Lively attempted to hijack control of the film with demands and threats, and despite getting most of what she wanted, decided to accuse Baldoni of a smear campaign, "to deflect attention and blame for Lively's disastrous misjudgments... Lively would recast herself as the long-suffering martyr by portraying Baldoni and Wayfarer as her persecutors," according to the complaint. The complaint also states that Baldoni "was made aware of Sloane planting an unfavorable, false and defamatory story about Baldoni's Baháʼí faith to Page Six" and also planted "a false story alleging that there were 'multiple' HR complaints during production." Baldoni argued that Lively, along with Reynolds and Sloane, engaged in a coordinated effort to damage his reputation, derail his career, and obscure the film's original purpose of highlighting domestic violence awareness. Lively's cut of the film was the version released in theaters despite Baldoni's cut testing "significantly higher" with test audiences due to her insistence that she would not promote the film otherwise, according to Baldoni's complaint. He also claimed that the smear campaign alleged by Lively did not exist.

On January 21, Baldoni's legal team released unedited behind‑the‑scenes footage from the making of It Ends With Us to counter Lively's allegations that Baldoni acted inappropriately during production of the film. Baldoni's lawyer alleged the raw footage shows the actors conversing casually between takes, including light joking and discussion of scene ideas, and demonstrating professional conduct throughout the scene in what they describe as a standard on‑set interaction. Lively had alleged in her complaint that during the scene, Baldoni "leaned forward and slowly dragged his lips from her ear and down her neck as he said, 'It smells so good,'" adding "None of this was remotely in character". Baldoni's countersuit disputed these allegations, asserting that the unedited footage contradicts Lively's characterization of the interaction and instead shows both actors behaving respectfully. He alleged that the video shows that, as they were dancing in the scene, Lively told Baldoni, "I'm probably getting spray tan on you'' to which he jokingly replied, "It smells good." Baldoni's countersuit also alleged that Lively was "unable to take direction" and that she "tried to direct him" while they were supposed to be in-character filming. His lawyer added that "Any suggestion that this scene was filmed in any manner other than pure professionalism by Baldoni is unequivocally countered with actual evidence."

On January 31, Baldoni filed a 168-page timeline of events made publicly available on a website. The timeline included text messages that provided further context into the environment during production to support the assertion that Lively had conducted a smear campaign against him. The original suit against The New York Times in California was voluntarily dismissed by Wayfarer after the paper was also named as a defendant in the new suit. In their February 2025 amended complaint, Baldoni's lawyer accused the NYT of conspiring with Lively long before her CRD complaint was filed stating "This fresh evidence corroborates what we knew all along, that due to a blind pursuit of power, Ms. Lively and her entire team colluded for months to destroy reputations through a complex web of lies, false accusations and the manipulation of illicitly received communications". The amended filing claimed that metadata on the newspaper's website suggested ''The Times'' had begun working on the story as early as October 2024 and had access to the CRD complaint before its December 2024 filing. A ''Times'' spokesperson called the early access claim "bogus".

Starting in February 2025, several defendants moved to dismiss the Wayfarer party's claims. On February 20, Lively's PR agent Leslie Sloane argued her statements about the cast disliking Baldoni were either opinion or were “substantially true”. Baldoni pushed back, claiming that she conspired with Lively, Ryan Reynolds, and The New York Times to unfairly shift blame onto Wayfarer in an “effort to salvage Lively's reputation”. The New York Times filed its own motion on February 28, arguing it merely engaged in standard newsgathering and reporting. Judge Liman granted a temporary stay of discovery, noting the paper had shown strong grounds for dismissal. Baldoni countered that the Times went beyond reporting and improperly endorsed Lively's narrative without due diligence. On March 18, Reynolds moved to dismiss, arguing the defamation claim rested solely on two alleged instances where he called Baldoni a “predator”, which he claimed was protected opinion. Two days later, Lively filed her own motion, invoking a new California statute intended to shield people who speak without malice about sexual assault or harassment from carrying of the costs of a defamation lawsuit.

In June 2025, Judge Lewis J. Liman dismissed Baldoni's countersuit against Lively and her associates. While he did not evaluate any facts of the case, he found Lively's accusations of sexual harassment "legally protected" due to being part of a legal proceeding and thus immune from a lawsuit. Liman also stated that Leslie Sloane, Lively's publicist, did not defame Baldoni in her dealings with Daily Mail, finding that Sloane relied on Lively's account. He similarly wrote that The New York Times, "reviewed the available evidence and reported, perhaps in a dramatized manner, what it believed to have happened". Liman allowed Baldoni to "amend and refile a couple of allegations regarding interference with contracts" but the Wayfarer parties ultimately chose not to, leading the judge to render final judgment on the countersuit in October 2025. The New York Times subsequently filed a lawsuit against Wayfarer seeking to recoup approximately $150,000 in legal fees. In July 2026, the New York State Supreme Court ruled in favor of The New York Times for this matter on anti-SLAPP grounds and ordered that Wayfarer pay a final total of nearly $172,000 in legal fees.

In June 2026, the court ruled on the motion Lively filed under a new California law designed to protect victims who come forward with allegations of sexual misconduct, where she asked for potentially tens of millions of dollars in punitive and treble damages. Judge Liman denied that Lively was owed the damages she was seeking and suggested she was attempting an "end-run around a jury trial". The court allowed her to seek "reasonable attorneys' fees" and litigation costs stemming from the defamation claim in Baldoni's countersuit following the case's earlier dismissal. Although Lively requested reimbursement to her of $7,495,526.87 in attorneys' fees and $539,541.01 in costs, the court on August 26, 2026, awarded her $363,245.40 in attorneys' fees and $44,206.35 in costs. The court deemed "reasonable" the attorneys' fees that Lively's attorneys at Willkie Farr & Gallagher charged her at hourly rates ranging from $1,551 to $2,795 for the partners assigned to the case and $1,275 to $1,573 for two of the associates. This is one of the first court cases in the country awarding attorneys' fees and costs to a prevailing party under the new California statute (Labor Code Section 47.1) that became effective on January 1, 2024.

=== Wallace v. Lively and Lively v. Wallace ===
In Lively's previously filed California Civil Rights Department complaint, she alleged social media PR expert Jed Wallace weaponized a "digital army" to create and promote fake social media content on behalf of Baldoni that appeared authentic, aiming to damage her reputation and sway public opinion. However, she did not include him in her initial lawsuit. In February 2025, Wallace responded by suing Lively in Texas federal court for defamation, seeking at least $7 million and a court declaration that he did not engage in harassment or retaliation. His complaint argued that "Neither Wallace nor Street had anything to do with the alleged sexual harassment, retaliation, failure to investigate or aiding and abetting the alleged harassment or alleged retaliation."

That same month, Blake Lively amended her complaint, adding Wallace. Wallace filed a motion to dismiss denying that there was a smear campaign and signed a declaration under penalty of perjury explaining that he merely engaged in online monitoring and saying that he "had (and have) no desire to torch Lively or her reputation, nor did I act on that imagined desire with anyone." In July 2025, Lively's case against Wallace was dismissed without prejudice with the judge ruling that Lively "did not prove her case that New York is the proper venue for Wallace to be sued." Lively amended and re-filed her complaint against Wallace, but it was dismissed again in November 2025 resulting in him being formally removed from her lawsuit. In May 2026, Wallace filed an appeal to revive his defamation suit against Lively in Texas.

== Gag order ==
On January 22, 2025, after Baldoni's team released the footage from the set depicting a dance scene that they assert contradicts a major sexual harassment claim in Lively's lawsuit, Lively requested a gag order against Justin Baldoni and his representation. Lively claimed that Baldoni's lawyer had leaked information regarding her, describing it as a "continuation of the initial retaliation harassment" she wrote about in her first complaint. Sources for Baldoni said it would be "grossly unfair to impose a gag order after Justin has been defamed by The New York Times in an article that they say has cost him three jobs and hundreds of millions of dollars." The judge denied the gag order request.

== Subpoenas ==
=== Vanzan ===
In April 2025, it was revealed that Lively obtained the text messages used in her CRD complaint by quietly filing a covert lawsuit in September 2024, months before she went public with accusations against Baldoni and his associates. Baldoni and his associates were not named as defendants, but were referred to as 10 unnamed Does. Because they were not directly named, they were not given notice and were unable to file any motion to prevent the private disclosures. The filing was also made without Lively or Reynold's name attached, instead listing her inactive company Vanzan as the plaintiff. Using the clandestine lawsuit, a subpoena was issued to Stephanie Jones, Baldoni's former publicist, and her firm Jonesworks, that demanded all communications related to Baldoni, Lively, and her husband, Ryan Reynolds. The subpoena led to the release of private messages between PR crisis manager Melissa Nathan and Jones's former employee Jennifer Abel, which were later used as the basis for Lively's claims. The lawsuit was withdrawn on December 19, 2024, two days before Lively's accusations were published in The New York Times. Baldoni's attorney expressed frustration with the secretive lawsuit and proclaimed that he believed its sole purpose was to serve subpoenas without giving proper notice to the affected parties.

=== Scooter Braun ===
On June 11, 2025, People reported that Lively was set to petition the court to subpoena the American media proprietor Scooter Braun and his entertainment company Hybe America. According to Deadline, the notice of the subpoena request was sent to Hybe on June 10. Lively's subpoena sought to recover documents and information that Hybe America has on Melissa Nathan, Baldoni's crisis PR agent since August 2024 and co-defendant in Lively's suit against Baldoni. Hybe has an investment stake in TAG, the publicity firm founded by Nathan. Following this news, publications associated Lively's subpoena of Braun with Swift's masters dispute with Braun and Baldoni's attempt to subpoena Swift in his lawsuit.

=== Perez Hilton ===
On July 19, 2025, Lively subpoenaed celebrity blogger Perez Hilton for communications with Baldoni and his associates. She alleged that Hilton may have participated in a coordinated smear campaign against her, using his platform to distribute derogatory content. Hilton responded by filing a motion to quash and denying that he was part of any smear campaign asserting "I was not paid by anyone to speak negatively about Blake Lively, I was not told to speak negatively about her, I was not promised any favors or discounts or anything". He argued that the subpoena was a "fishing expedition" and asserted his status as a journalist protected by the First Amendment. After initially representing himself, the American Civil Liberties Union (ACLU) of Nevada ultimately stepped in to represent him pro bono. One day after Hilton retained the ACLU, Lively withdrew the subpoena as it was no longer needed, given she had received the materials she sought from the defendants.

=== Content creators ===
In August 2025, Lively subpoenaed several content creators, suspecting them of working with Baldoni's team, which they denied. The initial subpoenas went out to Google and sought "account information for 16 YouTubers, including names, emails, IP addresses, physical addresses and bank account and credit card numbers". Lively also sent subpoenas to TikTok and ultimately targeted 107 content creators in total. The subpoenas required the content creators to either hire a lawyer or represent themselves to file motions to quash the subpoena. One subpoenaed YouTuber wrote that Lively's subpoena "targeted creators who have expressed unfavorable opinions about her online. The Subpoena was not supported by any evidence. It served to intimidate, harass, chill constitutionally protected free speech, and threaten the safety and privacy of non-parties."

== Taylor Swift ==
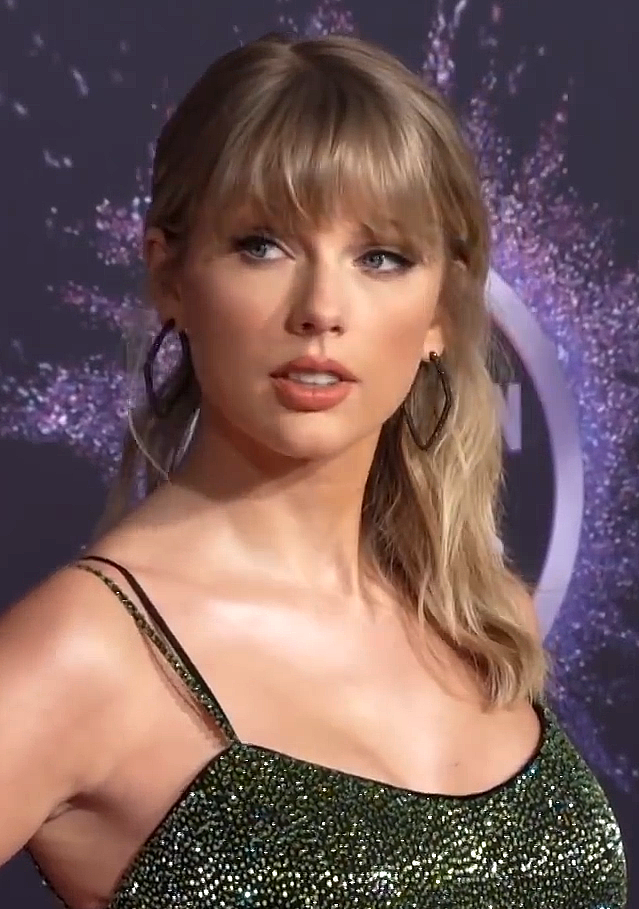
Baldoni mentioned Taylor Swift, Lively's friend, in his lawsuit and attempted to subpoena her as a witness. The judge struck his request, citing abuse of process, but permitted him access to texts between Lively and Swift.

Swift, a close friend of Lively and Reynolds and godmother of their children, was drawn into the litigation after Baldoni alleged that Lively used Swift and Reynolds to pressure him into accepting her creative contributions. The complaint alleged that, during a creative discussion via text, Lively referred to herself as "Khaleesi" and Reynolds and Swift as her "dragons" who have been "by my side for far too many experiences where I've been overlooked", which Baldoni interpreted as a threat. On May 9, 2025, after Lively listed Swift as a witness, she was subpoenaed by Baldoni. A spokesperson for Swift denied that she had any involvement with the film beyond licensing her song "My Tears Ricochet" and characterized the subpoena as an attempt to generate publicity.

On May 14, 2025, Baldoni's attorney wrote a letter to Judge Lewis J. Liman claiming that a "source who is highly likely to have reliable information" informed him that Lively's legal team threatened to leak private messages unless Swift publicly supported Lively. The letter also alleged that Lively asked Swift to delete their text messages from the past "four or five months". Lively's attorney denied the allegations as "unequivocally and demonstrably false" and asked Liman to strike the letter. Lively argued that Baldoni "was dragging Swift into the conflict as part of a public relations strategy." The following day, Baldoni's attorney filed a sworn affidavit under penalty of perjury to attest to his claims. Liman struck both of Baldoni's filings and wrote in his order, "the sole purpose of the letter is to 'promote public scandal' by advancing inflammatory accusations, on information and belief, against Lively and her counsel". Liman also warned Baldoni's team that they will receive sanctions if the court is misused any further. Baldoni subsequently withdrew his request to subpoena Swift. On June 18, 2025, the court allowed Baldoni to obtain the communications between Lively and Swift, without the need to subpoena Swift, ruling that the messages "may be relevant to the case". On September 11, Baldoni's lawyers submitted a letter to Liman, stating that Swift had agreed to a deposition and asked the judge to accommodate it in the scheduling order. In response, Lively's attorneys requested the judge deny the deposition, asserting it as another move "to fuel their relentless media strategy". Swift's attorneys reiterated that Swift "take[s] no role" in the disputes. On September 12, Liman denied Baldoni's request, writing that his team "have offered no evidence that they have served a renewed subpoena on Swift".

Swift released her twelfth studio album, The Life of a Showgirl, on October 3, 2025. When the album's tracklist was revealed pre-release, media outlets highlighted the tracks "Ruin the Friendship" and "Cancelled!" as possible diss tracks aimed at Lively, based on the song titles. After the album's release, many commentators ultimately interpreted the song “Cancelled!” as supportive of Lively. The song is said to be about challenging cancel culture and expressing solidarity with controversial friends amid public adversity and tarnished public image.

On January 20, 2026, court exhibits were unsealed that included text messages where Swift appeared to support Lively's efforts in gaining creative control over the film. Baldoni's lawyer highlighted an exchange prior to filming where Lively referred to Baldoni as a "doofus" and a "clown" who "thinks he's a writer now". It appeared to show Lively asking Swift to endorse her rewrite of a scene to help her pressure Baldoni into accepting the changes, to which Swift responded, "I'll do anything for you!!". In an exchange three days before Lively's complaint was publicized in The New York Times, Swift texted Lively, "I think this bitch knows something is coming because he's gotten out his tiny violin", in reference to an article where Baldoni disclosed that he was sexually assaulted in college. In a later text exchange, Lively apologized to Swift for becoming emotionally distant, "digitally paranoid", and less amicable with Swift, with Swift admitting to feeling uncomfortable with the situation and wanting to mend their friendship.

In December 2024, after the New York Times article was released and WME subsequently dropped Baldoni, Swift celebrated with Lively via text telling her "You won!" However, reports of a strain between the two began to emerge as Swift was drawn into the conflict. Media outlets started to allege that Swift's friendship with Lively had ended since the controversy and that they were "no longer on speaking terms." The sources claimed that Swift became upset with Lively after being referred to as Lively's "dragon", breaching Swift's trust.

== Sources ==
- Justin Baldoni's lawsuit website
- Clayton, Abené (January 4, 2025). "Justin Baldoni plans to sue Blake Lively after she accused him of harassment". The Guardian.
- Wagmeister, Elizabeth (January 16, 2025). "Justin Baldoni sues Blake Lively and Ryan Reynolds for $400 million, alleging Hollywood power couple sought to 'destroy' him". CNN Entertainment.
- Wagmiester, Elizabeth (May 9, 2025). "Taylor Swift subpoenaed in Blake Lively and Justin Baldoni case". CNN Entertainment.
