= It Ends with Us (soundtrack) =

It Ends with Us (Original Motion Picture Soundtrack)

Film score by Rob Simonsen and Duncan Blickenstaff
- Released: August 9, 2024
- Genre: Film score
- Length: 40:45
- Label: Madison Gate Records
- Producer: Rob Simonsen; Duncan Blickenstaff

Rob Simonsen chronology
Deadpool & Wolverine (2024)	It Ends with Us (2024)	Elio (2025)

Duncan Blickenstaff chronology
A Brief History of the Future (2024)	It Ends with Us (2024)	Nobody Wants This (2025)

It Ends with Us (Original Motion Picture Soundtrack) is the film score to the 2024 film It Ends with Us directed by Justin Baldoni who also co-starred with Blake Lively, along with Brandon Sklenar, Jenny Slate, and Hasan Minhaj. The score composed by Rob Simonsen and Duncan Blickenstaff and released on August 9, 2024 through Madison Gate Records.

== Background ==
In June 2024, it was reported that Rob Simonsen and Duncan Blickenstaff would jointly compose the score for It Ends with Us. Simonsen had replaced Brian Tyler, who previously composed Baldoni's Five Feet Apart (2019) and Clouds (2020). Before his involvement, Simonsen was working on Marvel's Deadpool & Wolverine which starred Blake's husband Ryan Reynolds, which had a week of recording left at the Abbey Road Studios in London. He received a text and video message from Blake affirming Simonsen's involvement and asked whether he could do the score within a week. But Simonsen had instead said that whether he would complete it in three weeks, due to the possibilities of completing the music within a week being immaterial. He then recorded the score at the same venue in London. Due to the shorter deadline of completing the score, he assigned Blickenstaff to co-compose the score, while Pierce Constanti provided additional music. Madison Gate Records released the soundtrack, coinciding with the film's release date.

== Track listing ==
It Ends with Us (Original Motion Picture Soundtrack) track listing
No.	Title	Length
1.	"Opening"	2:21
2.	"It Was Nice Meeting You"	1:38
3.	"Lily's Past"	1:01
4.	"Seeing Atlas"	0:52
5.	"First Impressions"	1:09
6.	"Lily Bloom's Flower Shop"	1:22
7.	"Naked Truths"	1:30
8.	"Getting Ready for Bed"	2:01
9.	"Bus Kiss"	2:12
10.	"What Can I Get You?"	0:55
11.	"Lily and Atlas Reconnect"	2:23
12.	"Anyone But Him"	3:14
13.	"Leave Him"	2:22
14.	"Proposal"	1:28
15.	"It's Nothing"	1:00
16.	"Fall in Love with Me"	1:27
17.	"Please Stop"	2:43
18.	"I Used to Love Flowers"	1:13
19.	"Lily Survives"	2:49
20.	"Birth"	1:03
21.	"It Ends with Us"	2:51
22.	"A New Beginning"	3:11
Total length:		40:45

== Reception ==
Filmtracks wrote "Between the awkward lyrics and vocal inflection in the main song and the lack of any convincing care from Simonsen and Blickenstaff, the soundtrack for It Ends With Us loses touch and contributes to the film's ills. The score was released on its own, and its 40 minutes will pass by pleasantly enough, but expect nothing from its cues to resonate for a story that required more heart." Ben of Soundtrack Universe wrote "In the end It Ends with Us is a rather lite though entertaining effort for those that enjoy their romantic melodramas with airy synth textures and sparse, contemporary orchestrations. Those expecting a more robust orchestral or thematic offering from Simonsen on par with his earlier work for the Blake Lively vehicle The Age of Adeline would do best to look elsewhere. Still, there's enough of interest here to warrant a mild recommendation though this is perhaps a case of if one heard something they liked within the film, then check out the score album." Andrew Robertson of Eye for Film wrote "Less disruptive the score by Duncan Blickenstaff and Rob Simonsen which was less a comforting blanket than neutral wallpaper." Owen Gleiberman of Variety and Lovia Gyarkye of The Hollywood Reporter called it "moving" and "tender score". Syed Zain Akhter of Southasia Magazine "Complementing the visuals is a poignant musical score by composer Rob Simonsen and Duncan Blickenstaff, whose melodies underscore the film's emotional beats with grace and subtlety. The soundtrack, featuring original songs and carefully chosen tracks, adds another layer of depth, ensuring that every scene resonates visually and aurally."

== Additional music ==
It Ends with Us featured several songs as heard in the film, including contributions from Taylor Swift, Lana Del Rey, Birdy, Brittany Howard and Cigarettes After Sex amongst others. These songs were not included in the soundtrack. On including the song, "My Tears Ricochet" from Swift's album Folklore (2020), Blake added "All of her songs are great, we could have put any song up there. We could have done like a voice memo song, it would have been the best song to have ever been in a movie." This song was heard in the first trailer.

- "Strangers" by Ethel Cain
- "Hymn" by Rhye
- "Everybody Needs a Friend" by Chyvonne Scott
- "Girl in Calico" by Tow'rs
- "Praise You" by Fatboy Slim
- "Money (That's What I Want)" by Barrett Strong
- "Dawn Chorus" by Thom Yorke
- "White Iverson" by Post Malone
- "Dark Rain" by DRAMA
- "Nothing's Gonna Hurt You Baby" by Cigarettes After Sex
- "Carry This Picture" by Dashboard Confessional
- "I Don't" by Brittany Howard
- "Skinny Love" by Birdy
- "Cherry" by Lana Del Rey
- "Fruits of My Labor" by Lucinda Williams
- "Horizon" by Aldous Harding
- "With Arms Wide Open" by Creed
- "Love the Hell Out of You" by Lewis Capaldi
- "My Tears Ricochet" by Taylor Swift
- "Everytime" by Ethel Cain

== Controversy ==
Brian Tyler was initially brought in to compose the score owing to his past collaborations with Baldoni. He had composed most of the score, based on Baldoni's ideas. However, when Blake took over the post-production duties, she insisted Tyler to be removed and Simonsen should be involved, as he had worked on Reynolds' Deadpool & Wolverine; she did not listen to Tyler's score. Baldoni and the producer Jamey Heath had fought with Blake over her decision to drop Tyler from the film, but left with no option, and eventually had to replace Tyler with Simonsen and Blickenstaff. Before his exit, Tyler was paid out his contract in full. Simonsen, who replaced Tyler, also considered his impromptu hire to be "little nutty" and inquired about a possible replacement which he was bit concerned.

== Credits ==
Credits adapted from Film Music Reporter:

- Music composers and producers: Rob Simonsen, Duncan Blickenstaff
- Music supervisor: Season Kent
- Supervising music editor: Erica Weis
- Music editors: Robb Boyd, Angie Rubin, Seth Glennie-Smith
- Additional music: Pierce Constanti
- Additional arrangements: Yuri Kwag, Christopher Wray
- Guitar: Christopher Wray
- Ambient design: Judson Crane
- Score coordinator: Taylor Lipari Hassett
- Music contractor: Whitney Martin
- Orchestrations: Norbert Elek, Thanh Tranh
- Score recording and mixing: Scott Michael Smith, Thor Feinberg
- Score mix assistant: Jacob Bauman
