= Southasia =

Southasia may refer to:

- South Asia, a subregion of Asia
- Southasia Magazine, an English-language political magazine about South Asia, published in Pakistan
- Himal Southasian, a news magazine published in Sri Lanka
- Southasia Trust, a company based in Lalitpur, Nepal, which previously published Himal Southasian
