= Kjersti Flaa =

Norwegian journalist

Kjersti Flaa (Note: Norwegian pronunciation: [ˈçæ̀ːʂʈɪ ˈfloː]) is a Norwegian junket reporter and journalist known for her promotional interviews with celebrities.

In 2020, Flaa sued the Hollywood Foreign Press Association after it did not elect her as a member. Her suit was dismissed, but inspired an investigation that led to changes in the organization.

She gained public attention in August 2024 after she uploaded a 2016 interview with actresses Blake Lively and Parker Posey promoting the film Café Society, where Lively showed hostility towards Flaa. The uploading coincided with controversy surrounding the film It Ends with Us involving Lively, who starred in the film, as well as the film's director Justin Baldoni.

== Early life and career ==
Kjersti Flaa was born in Norway. Her journalism career began primarily in New York before she relocated to Los Angeles in 2015 to focus on entertainment reporting. Flaa has written for Norwegian magazines and newspapers and has contributed to TV2's God kveld Norge (Good evening Norway). She founded Content Now TV, a production company, in 2018, making entertainment videos for Viaplay.

In 2019, she won third place for One-on-One Interview, TV Personalities at the 12th National Arts & Entertainment Journalism Awards for her interview with Henry Winkler. She was 2nd place for the 2019 SoCal Journalism Award Personality Profile (foreign correspondents) for her interview with Jane Fonda as well as the Foreign Correspondents Best Entertainment News or Feature for her interview with Diane Keaton at the 61st and 62nd SoCal Journalism Awards (held in 2019 and 2020 respectively).

=== Interviews ===
Flaa has published several of her interviews on YouTube, which has led to some media attention. As of late 2024, her YouTube-channel had over a hundred million views.

==== Anne Hathaway ====
In 2012, Flaa interviewed actress Anne Hathaway regarding the film Les Misérables. When Flaa uploaded this video in 2024, Hathaway sent her an apology via her publicist.

==== Blake Lively and Parker Posey ====
Flaa received attention for a 2016 interview with actresses Blake Lively and Parker Posey during the press tour for their film Café Society. The interview resurfaced in August 2024 when Flaa uploaded a clip to her YouTube channel, describing the encounter as "the most uncomfortable interview situation I have ever experienced". During the interview, Flaa congratulated Lively on her pregnancy and "little bump", to which Lively responded by saying "congrats on your little bump." Flaa later stated that the comment was hurtful due to her struggles with infertility at the time.

Flaa also asked the actresses about the film's costumes, leading Lively to question whether male actors would be asked similar questions. Flaa replied that they would. Flaa later mentioned that she would welcome an apology from Lively but expressed doubt that it would happen.

The upload happened shortly after the release of It Ends with Us which Lively was starring in, which was mired in controversy. This heightened interest in the video, which as of late 2024 had more than five million views. The New York Times mentioned Flaa in their reporting on the film's director Justin Baldoni's alleged smear campaign against Lively. Flaa responded to the Times, contesting what she described as the "insinuation" of her involvement. The Times then expanded the online version of their article, adding a statement from Flaa that the upload "was neither coordinated nor influenced by anyone associated with the alleged campaign". Elsewhere, she has said that "I posted the video after I had seen the movie", and "And I had a bad experience with Blake Lively, and at that time I was like 'I've kind of had enough of Hollywood' ... so I decided to post the video."

==== Claudia Kim ====
In November 2018, Flaa faced criticism after an interview with Korean actress Claudia Kim, during the press tour for Fantastic Beasts: The Crimes of Grindelwald. During the interview, Flaa asked Kim whether she had read the Harry Potter books in English when she was in middle school. The question was perceived by some as racially insensitive. Flaa issued public apologies, explaining that her question was based on curiosity and was not intended to be offensive, since she herself learned English as a second language later on in her life. HFPA brought up this incident in the 2020 suit.

==== Diane Keaton ====
Flaa won a 2020 62nd SoCal Journalism Award for an interview with Diane Keaton. The judges commented that it was "an engaging interview with a fascinating and thoughtful range of topics. The interviewer and Keaton maintained an endearing chemistry in their exchanges, which seemed to elicit authentic responses that surely resonate with viewers."

== Lawsuit against the Hollywood Foreign Press Association ==
In August 2020, Flaa filed an antitrust lawsuit against the Hollywood Foreign Press Association (HFPA), then-organizers of the Golden Globe Awards, after being denied membership in 2018 and again in 2019. The lawsuit alleged that the HFPA operated as a cartel, using its influence to monopolize entertainment journalism and exclude qualified journalists from joining the group. Flaa claimed that certain members opposed her membership due to concerns that she would compete with them for access to Hollywood coverage in Scandinavian outlets.

The lawsuit accused the HFPA of maintaining a culture of corruption and using its control over the Golden Globe Awards to maintain its power. The HFPA denied these claims, describing the lawsuit as a "publicity stunt" and asserting that membership could not be obtained through intimidation.

The lawsuit inspired an investigation by the Los Angeles Times which highlighted issues within the HFPA, including its lack of diversity—most notably, the absence of Black members. The controversy led to a Hollywood-wide boycott of the HFPA, with major studios cutting ties with the organization and NBC canceling the planned telecast of the 2022 Golden Globes. The HFPA implemented reforms, including adding new members and diversifying its ranks.

The suit was dismissed in November 2020. The judge found that Flaa had achieved professional success without HFPA membership. In December 2022, the Ninth Circuit Court of Appeals upheld the federal district court's decision to dismiss, finding no evidence to support her claims of antitrust violations.

== Personal life ==
Originally from Haslum, Norway, as of 2020, she lives in California. Flaa continues her work in entertainment journalism, maintaining a presence on her YouTube channel and in Norwegian media outlets. As of 2023, she is in a relationship with Swedish journalist Magnus Sundholm. Sundholm was a HFPA-member, but was expelled in 2021.
