= Golden Globe Foundation =

American not-for-profit organization

- Named after: Golden Globe Awards
- Predecessor: Hollywood Foreign Press Association
- Formation: June 12, 2023
- Type: 501(c)(4) non-profit organization
- Headquarters: West Hollywood, California
- Members: 65 (2024)
- President: Henry Arnaud
- Board of directors: Earl Gibson III (chairman); Henry Arnaud (treasurer); Tim Kittleson (secretary); Meher Tatna; Bianca Goodloe; Silvia Bizio; Mia Farrell; Jeff Harris; Helen Hoehne; Adam Tanswell
- Staff: Sandra Cuneo; Gregory Goeckner; Jason Little; (2024)
- Website: ggfdn.org

The Golden Globe Foundation is a nonprofit successor organization to the Hollywood Foreign Press Association (HFPA), which previously owned and managed the Golden Globe Awards.

The awards themselves are now owned and operated by Dick Clark Productions (DCP) following the June 12, 2023 dissolution of the HFPA in which HPFA sold all its assets and intellectual property to DCP and rebranded itself as the Golden Globe Foundation. The foundation is currently funded by the proceeds of this sale. The president of the foundation is Henry Arnaud.

The foundation, based in West Hollywood, California, is led by 9 board members and 3 members of staff. As of 2024, the foundation has 65 members.

In January 2024, the foundation announced $5 million in grants to 96 organizations catering to underserved communities, universities, and colleges as well as for film restoration projects and to assist journalists around the world. The grants were awarded across several categories. These included professional mentorship and training programs, promoting cultural exchange through film, special projects such as local arts and social services, and also mentoring programs.

The foundation announced grants to 83 nonprofits in December 2024.

== Members ==
The original membership was made up of former Hollywood Foreign Press Association (HFPA) members. Members are also voters for the Golden Globes awards (subject to yearly accreditation by the new operators).

In December 2023, 64 former HFPA members threatened to withhold their ballots after being informed they would not receive tickets to the Globes ceremony.

In February 2025, former HFPA members were informed they would no longer receive a yearly $75,000 payment from the Golden Globes Awards owners. This affected 50 voting members - a subset of the new 300-voting body which had expanded greatly following the dissolution of the HFPA.

== Lawsuit ==
The Golden Globe Foundation was named in a lawsuit against Penske Media and Jay Penske in July 2026. The suit, filed by the Hollywood Foreign Press Association (HFPA) alleges violations of federal and state antitrust laws. It is alleged that this acquisition was done by Penske to influence awards season races. The HFPA is seeking $150 million in damages and the unwinding of the agreement that transferred ownership of the Golden Globes to Penske Media.
