= Paylocity =

American financial software company

Paylocity Holding Corporation
- Type: Public
- Traded as: Nasdaq: PCTY; S&P 400 Component
- ISIN: US70438V1061
- Industry: Payroll service bureau Software as a service
- Predecessor: Ameripay Payroll, Ltd.
- Founded: 1997; 29 years ago Illinois, U.S.
- Founder: Steve Sarowitz
- Headquarters: Schaumburg, Illinois, U.S.
- Number of locations: 8
- Area served: North America
- Key people: Steve Beauchamp (Executive Chairman); Toby Williams (CEO); Ryan Glenn (CFO); Josh Scutt (SVP); Jill Morrison (CHRO); Art Chaisiriwatanasai (CISO); Nick Rost (CAO); Holly Fulp (CSO) Monica Roberts, CDO & VP)
- Products: HR & Payroll; Time & Labor; Recruiting; Expense Management; Onboarding; Performance Management; Compensation Management Asset Management Access Management & Identity
- Services: Online payroll and HR
- Revenue: ▲US$1.59 billion (2025)
- Operating income: ▲US$304 million (2025)
- Net income: ▲US$227 million (2025)
- Total assets: ▲US$4.39 billion(2025)
- Total equity: ▲US$1.23 billion (2025)
- Owner: Steve Sarowitz, and Adams Street Partners (private equity)
- Number of employees: 6,700 (2025)
- Website: www.paylocity.com

Paylocity Holding Corporation is an American provider of cloud-based payroll, spend management, and human capital management (HCM) software.

== History ==
The company was founded by Steve Sarowitz in 1997 as Ameripay Payroll Ltd. It was renamed Paylocity in December 2005. It relocated from Franklin Park, Illinois to Elk Grove Village, and later to Arlington Heights. The company moved its headquarters into a 309,000 square foot office in the former headquarters of Zurich Insurance North America in Schaumburg, Illinois.

In September 2007, Steve Beauchamp was appointed as president and chief operating officer and became CEO within a year.

In 2008, the company secured its first institutional funding with a $10 million Series A round from Adams Street Partners, followed by a $27.3 million Series B round in 2012.

In 2010, Paylocity acquired Payroll Online and expanded its market presence in human capital management (HCM).

Paylocity held an initial public offering in March 2014, raising about $120 million. At the time of the IPO, founder Steve Sarowitz held 44% ownership of the company.

From 2019 to 2024, Paylocity acquired a number of companies in HCM space, including BeneFLEX, VidGrid, Samepage, Blue Marble Payroll, Cloudsnap, Trace and Airbase Inc.

== Products and services ==
Paylocity offers human capital management (HCM) solutions, providing integrated tools for managing payroll, HR functions, time tracking, spend management, and talent acquisition primarily for small to mid-sized businesses with 50 to 1,000 employees.

== Acquisitions ==
- March 2018: BeneFLEX (benefits administration)
- April 2020: VidGrid (video-based learning platform)
- November 2020: Samepage (team collaboration solution)
- September 2021: Blue Marble Payroll (international payroll services)
- January 2022: Cloudsnap (video platform for employee engagement)
- December 2023: Trace (headcount planning tool)
- September 2024: Airbase Inc. (spending management software)

== Awards ==
- 2003, 2004, 2007-2014 - Inc. Magazine 5,000 fastest growing private companies
- 2013-2015 - Deloitte Fast 500 (fastest growing technology companies)
- 2021 - Fortune's 100 Fastest Growing Companies (#51)
