= Hollywood Foreign Press Association =

Defunct American media organization

- Abbreviation: HFPA
- Formation: 1943
- Dissolved: June 12, 2023; 3 years ago
- Type: 501(c)(6)
- Legal status: Professional association
- Purpose: A business league of journalists and photographers covering the entertainment industry for foreign publications.
- Headquarters: West Hollywood, California, U.S.
- Location: United States
- Coordinates: 34.082198°N 118.385508°W
- Members: 105
- Interim Chief Executive Officer: Todd L. Boehly
- President: Helen Hoehne / RE-ESTABLISHED HFPA President 2025 - Scott Orlin
- Executive Secretary: Adam Tanswell
- Treasurer: Henry Arnaud
- Subsidiaries: Hollywood Foreign Press Association Charitable Trust (501(c)(3))
- Revenue: $32,155,768 (2019)
- Expenses: $16,517,902 (2019)
- Employees: 99 (2018)
- Website: hfpa.org (2019 archive)

The Hollywood Foreign Press Association (HFPA) was a nonprofit organization of journalists and photographers who reported on the American entertainment industry for predominantly foreign media markets. It is best known for founding and conducting the annual Golden Globe Awards ceremony in Los Angeles, California, which honors notable achievements in film and television, from its inception in 1943 until 2023. The HFPA consisted of about 105 members from approximately 55 countries with a combined following of more than 250 million.

HFPA was rebranded to the Golden Globe Foundation on June 12, 2023.

== History ==
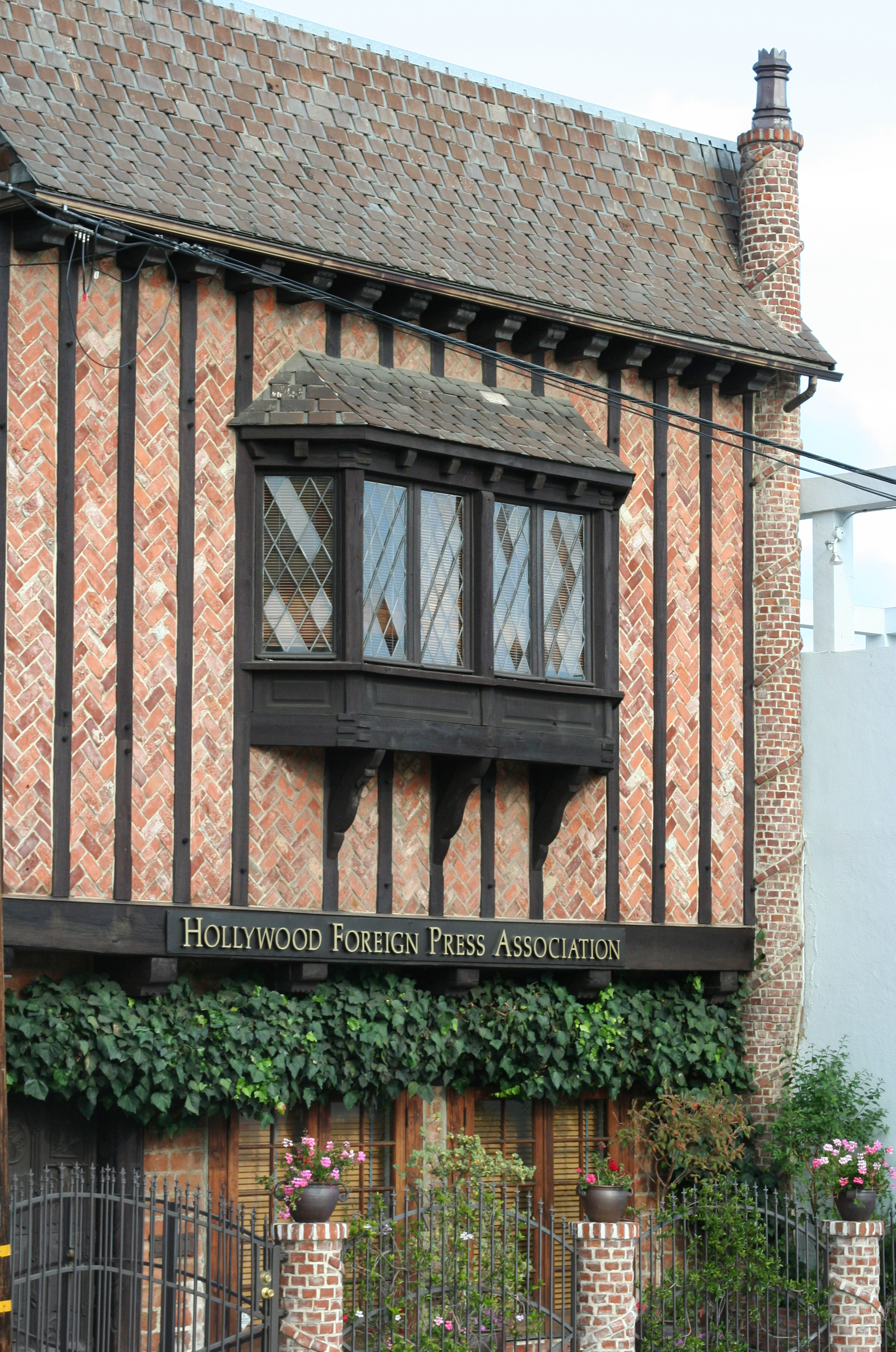
The former Hollywood Foreign Press Association building facade in West Hollywood, CA

The association was founded in 1943, by Los Angeles-based foreign journalists who wanted a more organized distributing process for cinema news to non-U.S. markets.

The first Golden Globes awardees were for the cinema industry in early 1944 with a ceremony at 20th Century Fox. There, Jennifer Jones was awarded "Best Actress" honors for The Song of Bernadette, which also won for "Best Film", while Paul Lukas took home "Best Actor" laurels for Watch on the Rhine. Awards were presented in the form of scrolls.

The following year members came up with the idea of presenting winners with a golden globe encircled with a strip of motion picture film and mounted on a pedestal.

In 1950, differing philosophies among members caused a schism within the organization, resulting in a split into two separate groups: The Hollywood Foreign Correspondents Association and the Foreign Press Association of Hollywood. The separation ended in 1955 when the journalists reunited under the collective title The Hollywood Foreign Press Association with firm guidelines and requirements for membership.

In 1955, the Golden Globes began honoring achievements in television as well as in film. The first honorees in the "Best Television Show" category that year were Dinah Shore, Lucy & Desi, The American Comedy and Davy Crockett.

After multiple controversies and attempts at reform, HFPA was rebranded to the Golden Globe Foundation on June 12, 2023, and the assets related to the Golden Globes had been purchased by Dick Clark Productions and Eldridge Industries, with the proceeds going to a new non-profit created to continue the charitable giving of the HFPA.

In December 2023, 64 former HFPA members (who had remained as Golden Globes voters) threatened to withhold their ballots after being informed they would not receive tickets to the Globes ceremony.

At the 81st Golden Globe Awards in 2024, multiple celebrities thanked the now defunct organization.

In February 2025, former HFPA members were informed they would no longer receive a yearly $75,000 payment from the Golden Globes Awards owners.

=== Lawsuit against Jay Penske and Penske Media ===
In July 2026, the HFPA sued Jay Penske and Penske Media in federal court over their acquisition of the Golden Globe Awards. Penske Media’s ownership of the Golden Globe Awards as well as its ownership of Hollywood publications including The Hollywood Reporter, Variety and Deadline has been a source of controversy. The Golden Globe Awards are presented by the Penske-owned Dick Clark Productions. The federal suite alleges violations of federal and state antitrust laws. It is alleged that this acquisition was done by Penske to influence awards season races. The HFPA is seeking $150 million in damages and the invalidation of the agreement that transferred ownership of the Golden Globes to Penske Media.

== Membership criteria ==
Membership meetings were held monthly, and the officers and directors were elected annually.

In February 2021, the Los Angeles Times reported that none of the HFPA members were black. In response, in early May 2021, the association announced a series of reforms aimed at increasing membership with a "specific focus on recruiting Black members," improving governance, and reducing conflicts of interest.

Lorenzo Soria was elected President of Hollywood Foreign Press Association in 2019. Helen Hoehne was named President in September 2021.

== Charity ==
The HFPA was a nonprofit organization that donated funds to entertainment-related charities. The Golden Globe Awards generated $10 million from its television broadcast each year. The HFPA hosted an annual grants banquet to distribute funds; $2.1 million was donated to nonprofits in 2015, leaving $8 million not being donated to any charities. According to the HFPA, from 1990 to 2015, over $23.9 million was donated to charity and used to fund scholarships and grants; this averaged less than $1 million per year. In 2019, the organization disbursed grants worth under $6 million from a total income of over $30 million.

Funds have also been used to restore more than 90 films, including King Kong (1933) and Woman on the Run (1950).

With the winding down of the HFPA, its philanthropic activities transitioned to a new non-profit known as the Golden Globe Foundation.

== HFPA Residency ==
In 2008, the HFPA announced its residency program in partnership with Film Independent. The program selects three winners from the Italian Venice Film Festival's Orizzonti section and three participants from Canada's Toronto International Film Festival to Los Angeles for an intensive workshop.

The 2019 residency fellows included Emir Baigazin, Mahmut F. Coskun, Georgia Fu, Maria Bozzi, Avril Z. Speaks, Rati Tsiteladze, and Cynthia Kao.

The 2020 residency program winners were TIFF participants: All These Creatures by Australian Charles Williams, Misterio by Chema Garcia from Spain, and Measure by Canadian director Karen Chapman. This is in addition to Venice winners: Atlantis, by Ukrainian Valentyn Vasyanovych, Blanco en Blanco by Spaniard Théo Court and Filipino Raymund Ribay Gutierrez.

The 2021–22 residency fellows were: Maha Al-Saati (Saudi Arabia) Hair: The Story of Grass, Jeff Wong (Canada) H'mong Sisters, Alvaro Gago Diaz (Spain) Matria, Ahmad Bahrami (Iran) The Wasteland, Ana Rocha de Sousa (Portugal) Listen, Ricky D'Ambrose (USA) The Cathedral, Jose Maria Aviles (Ecuador) Al Oriente, Sol Berruezo Pichon-Riviére (Argentina) Nuestros Dias Mas Felices, Beatrice Baldacci (Italy) La Tana, Sahraa Karimi (Afghanistan), Rohena Gera (India), and Nuhash Humayun (Bangladesh).

The 2023 residency program fellows were: Tahmini Raffaella (Banu), Monica Dugo (Come le tartarughe), Eldar Shibanov (Mountain Onion), Hanna Västinsalo (Palimpsest), Phumelele Mthembu (African America), and Soudade Kaadan (Nezouh).

== Controversies ==
=== Membership and accusations of self-dealing ===
Although it counted some prominent journalists among its membership, since at least the 1990s, the HFPA has been accused of lax membership criteria, including accepting members with little or no journalistic background. A 1996 article in the Washington Post alleged that the majority of HFPA members were not full-time professional journalists, but rather part-time freelance writers for smaller publications as well as non-journalists, ranging from a college professor to an appliance salesman.

An antitrust lawsuit was filed against the HFPA in August 2020 by a Norwegian journalist, Kjersti Flaa, whose request for membership had been repeatedly rejected. She alleged that the group was operating as a cartel that monopolized the market of foreign entertainment journalism, that she had been rejected as not to cannibalize other Scandinavian members, and that her inability to join was impacting her ability to gain their "exclusive" access to celebrities and junkets. On November 24, 2020, a federal court threw out the lawsuit, arguing that Flaa did not define the "market" that the HFPA was allegedly monopolizing, and that the HFPA was not subject to the right of fair procedure, since engaging in an "activity of some interest to the public" was not the same as operating "in the public interest."

An investigation by the Los Angeles Times in 2021 found that the HFPA regularly paid its members over $1 million annually for serving on various committees, which might jeopardize its status as a tax-exempt non-profit organization. The report noted that the association's small membership made it easier to sway than the significantly larger voting bodies of the Academy of Motion Picture Arts and Sciences (AMPAS) and the Television Academy. Members allegedly were offered access to actors and film sets, as well as expensive gifts, such as high-priced hotel stays and restaurant bookings. The investigation alleged that many of HFPA members are not journalists, and that established foreign journalists who apply are regularly rejected.

=== Black representation ===
In 2021, the HFPA faced criticism for the lack of Black representation among its members; it was reported by the Los Angeles Times that the association had not had a new person of color member since Meher Tatna, its former president, in 2002. Variety cited criteria requiring new members to have been sponsored by two current HFPA members as being a major roadblock towards recruiting new Black members, stating that "for a foreign journalist based in Los Angeles, building relationships with this small group, which are largely unknown to the public, is difficult due to its tight and exclusive membership policies. More transparency would help alleviate the public perception that the group doesn't seek to be inclusive."

Ahead of the 78th Golden Globe Awards, Time's Up launched a social media campaign to draw attention to the issue. On February 25, 2021, the HFPA stated that it was "fully committed to ensuring our membership is reflective of the communities around the world who love film, TV and the artists inspiring and educating them" and that it planned to "immediately work to implement an action plan" to "bring in Black members, as well as members from other underrepresented backgrounds." The HFPA stated that over 35 percent of its members were people of color from non-European countries, but it was aware that none of its current members were Black.

On March 9, 2021, the HFPA announced that it had hired Shaun R. Harper, executive director of the USC Race and Equity Center, as its new "strategic diversity officer," and hired Ropes & Gray to "support the continued development of a confidential reporting system for investigating alleged violations of our ethical standards and code of conduct." In April 2021, former HFPA president Philip Berk was expelled after he emailed fellow members an article that described Black Lives Matter as a "racist hate movement" and slammed organizer Patrisse Cullors for purchasing a home in an upscale neighborhood.

==== Attempts at reforms, boycotts ====
On May 3, 2021, the HFPA announced plans for a reform package, including a 50 percent increase in members over the next 18 months with a particular focus on underrepresented groups (with at least 20 new members over the next year, which would have a focus on new Black members), new professional administrative positions (including a CEO, CFO, chief diversity, equity, and inclusion officer, and chief human resources officer), establishing an oversight board for a "critical organizational reform," and other accountability improvements (including term limits for board members and restricting internal "gifts"). The majority of the HFPA's members voted in favor of the package on May 6; due to California law, the changes to the organization's bylaws were subject to further votes by the HFPA's full membership scheduled in June and July.

While Dick Clark Productions and NBC—the long-time producer and broadcaster of the Golden Globes respectively—supported the planned reforms, Time's Up and a group of 100 PR firms criticized the lack of given timelines for filling some of the new management positions, arguing that they would not be completed soon enough to have any material impact on the cycle of the next Golden Globes. Time's Up further argued that the package "largely contains no specifics" nor "commitments to real accountability or change." In addition, the HFPA did not open up the positions of General Counsel and COO as incumbent George Goeckner would continue in these roles, so he was seen as "holding almost all the keys to all the cabinets and skeleton closets of the HFPA" making him "the real power in the place by many in the know".

On May 7, 2021, both Amazon Studios and Netflix announced that they would stop their activities with the HFPA until sufficient actions on reforms are made. Netflix co-CEO Ted Sarandos explained that the company "[doesn't] believe these proposed new policies—particularly around the size and speed of membership growth—will tackle the HFPA's systemic diversity and inclusion challenges, or the lack of clear standards for how your members should operate."

On May 10, AT&T-owned WarnerMedia and its subsidiaries similarly boycotted the HFPA, stating that the proposed reforms "[don't go] far enough in addressing the breadth of our concerns, nor does your timeline capture the immediate need by which these issues should be addressed," and also criticizing "special favors and unprofessional requests [that] have been made to our teams and to others across the industry," the lack of diversity among Golden Globe nominees and winners, and the HFPA not having an "enforced code of conduct that includes zero tolerance for unwanted physical contact of all talent and staff."

The same day, NBC announced that it would not broadcast the 79th Golden Globe Awards ceremony in 2022, stating that "change of this magnitude takes time and work, and we feel strongly that the HFPA needs time to do it right," and that "we are hopeful we will be in a position to air the show in January 2023." In support of the boycotts, Tom Cruise returned the Golden Globes that he won for Born on the Fourth of July, Jerry Maguire and Magnolia. Following these events, the HFPA released a new timeline for its reforms, which would see the process completed by the week of August 2.

On October 1, the HFPA released a list of 21 new members that it had recruited under these reforms, increasing its membership by 20 percent. The HFPA then announced on October 15 that it still planned to hold the 79th Golden Globe Awards ceremony anyway, with or without a U.S. broadcaster. The ceremony was ultimately held as a private event with only HFPA beneficiaries present, and contained a major focus on its philanthropic activities.

In July 2022, the HFPA approved a major restructuring, under which interim CEO Todd Boehly would establish a for-profit entity via his holding company Eldridge Industries (owner of ceremony producer Dick Clark Productions, as well as the entertainment trade publication The Hollywood Reporter) that will hold the Golden Globe Awards' intellectual property and oversee the "professionalization and modernization" of the ceremony, including "[increasing] the size and diversity of the available voters for the annual awards." The HFPA's philanthropic activities would continue separately as a non-profit entity, the Golden Globe Foundation.

HFPA was rebranded to Golden Globe Foundation on June 12, 2023.
