= It Ends with Us =

2016 romance novel by Colleen Hoover

- First edition cover
- Author: Colleen Hoover
- Language: English
- Genre: Romance
- Set in: Boston, Massachusetts
- Publisher: Atria Books
- Publication date: August 2, 2016
- Publication place: New York
- Media type: Print (paperback)
- Pages: 376
- ISBN: 978-1-5011-1036-8 (First edition)
- OCLC: 928481387
- Dewey Decimal: 813/.6
- LC Class: PS3608.O623 I84 2016
- Followed by: It Starts with Us

It Ends with Us is a romance novel by Colleen Hoover, published by Atria Books on August 2, 2016. The story follows florist Lily Bloom, whose abusive relationship with neurosurgeon Ryle Kincaid is compounded when her high school boyfriend Atlas Corrigan re-enters her life. It explores themes of domestic violence and emotional abuse. Based on the relationship between her mother and father, Hoover described it as "the hardest book I've ever written".

As of 2019, the novel had sold over one million copies worldwide and been translated into over twenty languages. In 2021, the novel experienced a resurgence in popularity through TikTok and topped sales lists for 2022 and 2023. A sequel titled It Starts with Us was published in October 2022. A film adaptation was released in August 2024, with a screenplay by Christy Hall. It was directed by Justin Baldoni, with Blake Lively, Baldoni, and Brandon Sklenar in leading roles.

== Plot ==
23-year-old college graduate Lily Bloom moves to Boston with hopes of opening her own floral shop. She grew up in a broken family – her late father, Andrew, would physically abuse her mother, Jenny, leading Lily to resent him, as well as resenting Jenny for staying with him. She has recently given a eulogy at Andrew's funeral in her hometown of Plethora, Maine, during which she announced she would list five things she loved the most about him, then stood in silence for several seconds before walking off.

Lily reads through her childhood diaries and remembers her first love, Atlas Corrigan, who left to join the military but promised to return to her. She later meets Ryle Kincaid, a charming, ambitious 30-year-old neurosurgeon. They are mutually attracted, but do not pursue a relationship as Lily is seeking commitment while Ryle is only interested in a string of casual affairs. However, once Lily successfully starts her business, they continue to meet and eventually begin a relationship.

One night, Lily laughs when Ryle accidentally drops a casserole, and he angrily slaps her before frantically apologizing. Lily is reminded of her childhood; while horrified, she decides they are different from her parents and accepts his apologies, but warns him that she will leave him if he hurts her again.

While dining at a restaurant with Ryle, she discovers that Atlas is the owner and head chef there and reconnects with him, making Ryle instantly jealous despite her insistence that Atlas is only a friend. Noticing Lily's bruised eye and Ryle's bandaged hand, Atlas suspects Ryle may be abusing her. He corners her in the bathroom and begs her to leave Ryle. Ryle discovers them and assumes the worst, leading to a violent confrontation between the men. The next day, Atlas visits Lily's shop to apologize for the incident, but gives her his phone number in case she ever needs it.

One night, Lily and Ryle impulsively get married in Vegas, and have a stable marriage until he finds Atlas's number and pushes her down the stairs. He then confesses that as a child, he accidentally shot and killed his brother Emerson with their father's gun, resulting in unresolved trauma that manifests in bouts of uncontrollable rage. Lily forgives him and agrees to help him work through his anger issues. He later finds and reads her diaries, along with a local magazine article that contains an interview with Atlas; furious upon learning that Atlas named his restaurant in Lily's honor, he attempts to rape her, knocking her unconscious when she tries to defend herself.

Lily wakes up, escapes the house, and calls Atlas. He takes her to the hospital, where she discovers she is pregnant with Ryle's child, which she opts to keep a secret from him. She stays with Atlas for a few days while Ryle leaves for a fellowship in England, and eventually moves back home while Ryle is still out of the country. Atlas admits he still has feelings for Lily, but has suppressed them because of her marriage to Ryle. Finally understanding what her mother went through, Lily confides in Jenny about the abuse. Jenny implores Lily to leave Ryle and not make the same mistakes she did.

When Ryle returns, Lily forms a tentative truce with him and allows him to help her through the final few months of her pregnancy, but remains emotionally distant from him. Lily later gives birth to a daughter, whom she names after Ryle's late brother. After giving birth, Lily realizes she does not want her daughter to grow up witnessing Ryle's aggressive outbursts, and tells him she wants a divorce. He tearfully begs her to reconsider, but finally understands her perspective and agrees to separate after she asks him how he would react if their daughter told him she was being abused by her partner. Lily hopes she has finally ended the cycle of abuse in her family, telling her daughter, "It ends with us."

In the epilogue, Lily, who is co-parenting with Ryle, finds Atlas and tells him that she is ready to restart her relationship with him.

== Background and publication ==
It Ends with Us was published by Atria Books on August 2, 2016. Based on the relationship between her mother and father, Hoover described it as "the hardest book I've ever written". It explores themes of domestic violence and emotional abuse. However, the book is ultimately still billed as a "romance novel". The book's publisher described it as a story about "a workaholic with a too-good-to-be-true romance who can't stop thinking about her first love".

On April 18, 2023, a special "collector's edition" of the book was published. It features a Q&A between Hoover and her mother and comes in hardcover with a foil embossed jacket, foil stamped binding and newly designed endpapers that wrap around the front and back covers.

== Reception ==
=== Critical response ===
In a starred review, Kirkus Reviews wrote, "The relationships are portrayed with compassion and honesty" and concluded that the novel "powerfully illustrates the devastation of abuse—and the strength of the survivors". Romantic Times stated: "It Ends with Us is a perfect example of the author's writing chops and her ability to weave together uplifting, romantic and somber plotlines. No matter your level of fandom, readers will love and respect protagonist Lily and learn something from her struggles."

=== Sales ===
As of 2019, the novel had sold more than one million copies worldwide and been translated into more than twenty languages.

In 2021, the novel – and Hoover's works overall – experienced a surge in popularity due to attention from the #BookTok community on TikTok. In January 2022, It Ends with Us debuted at number 1 on The New York Times combined fiction best-seller list. It was number 1 on the Publishers Weekly adult list and number 1 overall in the first six months of 2022, selling a total of 925,221 units. It was also number 1 on the Publishers Weekly annual list, selling a total of 2,729,007 copies. It was the best-selling novel of 2023 too, with a total of 1,292,733 copies. It Ends With Us has more than one billion tags on TikTok.

Following the film adaptation's trailer release, the novel returned to number one on Amazon. On August 11, 2024, two days after the film's release, the novel returned to number one on The New York Times best-seller list.

=== Accolades ===
The novel won the 2016 Goodreads Choice Award for Best Romance.

== Sequel ==
In February 2022, it was announced that Atria Books would publish a sequel to It Ends with Us in October 2022. The follow-up, titled It Starts with Us, was published on October 18, 2022. The sequel continues from where It Ends with Us ended and centers on the relationship between Lily and Atlas.

== Coloring book ==
In January 2023, Hoover announced the planned release of a coloring book based on It Ends With Us. Following backlash from readers due to the novel's subject matter of domestic violence, Hoover decided to cancel the project the next day, stating: "The coloring book was developed with Lily's strength in mind, but I can absolutely see how this was tone-deaf." Atria Books confirmed that they would not proceed with the coloring book's publication.

== Film adaptation ==
In July 2019, Justin Baldoni optioned the novel for a film adaptation, produced through his Wayfarer Entertainment company. In January 2023, Blake Lively was cast in the role of Lily Bloom. Baldoni, who plays Ryle Kincaid, directed the film and Christy Hall adapted the script. In April 2023, Brandon Sklenar was cast to play the role of Atlas. Filming began in Hoboken, New Jersey, on May 5, 2023. The film was theatrically released on August 9, 2024. It received mixed reviews from critics, but was a box-office success, grossing $351 million worldwide against a production budget of $25 million.
