= Elio (soundtrack) =

Soundtrack album by Rob Simonsen

Elio (Original Motion Picture Soundtrack)

Soundtrack album by Rob Simonsen
- Released: June 20, 2025
- Recorded: 2023–2025
- Studios: Sony Scoring Stage, Sony Pictures Studios, Culver City, California
- Genre: Film score
- Label: Walt Disney
- Producer: Rob Simonsen

Rob Simonsen chronology
It Ends with Us (2024)	Elio (2025)	Caught Stealing (2025)

Elio (Original Motion Picture Soundtrack) is the soundtrack album to the 2025 Disney/Pixar film of the same name. The original score is composed by Rob Simonsen. The album was released by Walt Disney Records on June 20, 2025, the same day as the film's theatrical release.

== Background ==
In November 2024, Rob Simonsen was announced to compose the score for Disney/Pixar's Elio. This marks the composer's first animated film. Director Madeline Sharafian described the score as a significant highlight of the picture, adding that it is a "music-forward movie". Simonsen was brought in to work on Elio about two and half years before the film's release. Pixar shared with him the story of the film, and Simonsen strongly resonated with it. The composer described the time frame of the project to be much longer than what he is used to in live-action. He also felt the medium of animation provided less restrictions and allowed for works with "a little bit more inherent music logic to it". He first came up with a suite after viewing a rough cut of the film and chatting with the director. This eventually became the title character's theme.

Each major setting of Elio was given a unique musical identity. Hylurg's sound focuses on a "low male choir and low brass". For Communiverse, Simonsen used choir dolls—small wooden robot dolls made by Swedish company, Teenage Engineering. The dolls are encoded with vowels, words, and consonants which resemble language but not any instantly recognizable kind. The goal was to create an alien sound for the setting, one that shares an "uncanny resemblance to human language", but still sounds off and technological. In contrast, for Earth, the composer desired a grounded and atmospheric sound, with "simple piano melodies" to musically depict Elio's heart and desires. For the montage of Elio and Glordon having fun in the Communiverse, Simonsen wrote a musical piece inspire by space disco. His goal for the piece was to create a nostalgic, whimsical sound with a solid beat. The song, "Once in a Lifetime" (1981) by Talking Heads was already in the film before Simonsen was hired. According to Simonsen, Zoe Saldaña, the voice of Aunt Olga suggested the song that plays on the character's car radio: Carmesí (2016) by Vicente García.

== Release and reception ==
The soundtrack album was released by Walt Disney Records on June 20, 2025, the same day as the film's theatrical release. Tim Grierson of Screen International, said that Simonsen's score "does its best to honour the picture's disparate tones, ranging from tear-jerkingly emotional to gee-whiz exciting". Matt Neglia of Next Big Picture praised the score for complementing all the films tones, from the upbeat and inspirational to the subtle and melancholic. Martin Shore of Tom's Guide, like Neglia praised the dynamic quality of Simonsen's score. Wilson Chapman of IndieWire described the score as generic and over reliant on bombast. Similarly, Lisa Laman of Culturess criticized Simonsen's score as one of the film's weakest components and wished it had more "boldness" reminiscent of the best Pixar scores.

== Track listing ==
All music is composed by Rob Simonsen.

Elio (Original Motion Picture Soundtrack) track listing
No.	Title	Length
1.	"Elio"	1:34
2.	"Are We Alone?"	3:14
3.	"Activate Supernova"	1:59
4.	"The Signal"	2:48
5.	"Rooftop"	1:42
6.	"Bring Us Your Leader"	2:59
7.	"Abduction"	1:39
8.	"The Communiverse"	4:58
9.	"Lord Grigon"	3:07
10.	"Temporary Replacement"	1:40
11.	"He Found the Mint"	1:34
12.	"You're the Alpha"	0:51
13.	"A Dangerous Game"	3:09
14.	"Escape Attempt"	2:16
15.	"Glordon"	1:57
16.	"Lava Tubes"	2:48
17.	"Bargaining Chip, Cool!"	3:05
18.	"Hold My Glorp"	1:41
19.	"SkiddoPOP-PUH"	1:25
20.	"Another Glordon"	2:32
21.	"Something's Off"	2:38
22.	"Carapace"	1:32
23.	"Not Fooled"	3:58
24.	"Reunion"	3:11
25.	"A Distraction"	1:51
26.	"Escaping Earth"	3:13
27.	"Debris Field"	4:33
28.	"Father and Son"	3:26
29.	"The Return"	5:08
30.	"Elio Suite"	5:11
