= Daddio (film) =

2023 film by Christy Hall

- Theatrical release poster
- Directed by: Christy Hall
- Written by: Christy Hall
- Produced by: Dakota Johnson; Ro Donnelly; Emma Tillinger Koskoff; Christy Hall; Paris Kassidokostas-Latsis; Terry Dougas
- Starring: Dakota Johnson; Sean Penn
- Cinematography: Phedon Papamichael
- Edited by: Lisa Zeno Churgin
- Music by: Dickon Hinchliffe
- Production companies: Hercules Film Fund; TeaTime Pictures; Raindrop Valley; Projected Picture Works; Rhea Films
- Distributed by: Sony Pictures Classics
- Release dates: September 1, 2023 (Telluride); June 28, 2024 (United States)
- Running time: 101 minutes
- Country: United States
- Language: English
- Box office: $1.9 million

Daddio is a 2023 American drama film produced, written and directed by Christy Hall. It stars Dakota Johnson (who also produced) as a young woman returning home to Midtown Manhattan from JFK International Airport by cab after a trip, who unexpectedly ends up conversing with her taxi driver (Sean Penn).

After premiering at the 50th Telluride Film Festival on September 1, 2023, Daddio was released in select cinemas in the United States and Canada by Sony Pictures Classics on June 28, 2024.

== Plot ==
Upon her JFK arrival, thirty-something Girlie hails a taxi to her Manhattan apartment. Her middle-aged cabbie, Clark, strikes up a conversation that turns into an honest, multifaceted dialogue.

After a few minutes, Clark drifts into a monologue about globalization worsening the world. In his view, what is considered valuable has changed, from currency transitioning into a virtual space to technology rendering traditional yellow cabs obsolete in favor of apps that will eventually phase out human drivers.

Girlie asks the cabbie his name, then Clark very decidedly describes her. He sees she is a New Yorker by how she carries herself and dresses, how she looks him in the eye fearlessly, saying her destination decidedly. Not fastening her seatbelt and turning off the touristy video upon entering also shows this.

After a dissatisfying message interaction with a male, Girlie is drawn into conversation with Clark. She tells him about her roots in a small Oklahoma town, her nine years as a New Yorker, and her career as a programmer.

Clark hails from Hell's Kitchen. Now gentrified, the area where Girlie lives was once a working-class neighborhood plagued by drugs and prostitution. Clark later moved to Jackson Heights, Queens.

The taxi hits a traffic jam due to a car accident, so Girlie again checks her phone. The man has left her a string of comments. When Girlie tells him that her trip to Oklahoma was hard, he again switches to sexual innuendo, disgusting her with a dick pic.

As Clark asks about Girlie's Oklahoma trip, she gladly puts down the phone and tells him about her older half sister. Although Girlie calls her a bitch, they enjoyed their two-week visit. As children, her 11-years-older sister would torment her by tying her ankles and wrists so she would figure out how to escape.

Clark turns to give Girlie his full attention. He asks her age, which she refuses to reveal, reminding him women are treated differently once their age is known. Clark concedes her point, then asks if she has a significant other. When Girlie is vague, he immediately concludes she is seeing a married man.

When Girlie admits the man is married, Clark warns her never to use the word "love" in an affair. He quickly deduces from her reaction that she already has, which she initially denies before conceding. Clark insists she made a big mistake, as her married man only wants sex and will never leave his wife, which she must accept.

Clark says men just want dumb women who give them dirty sex. Girlie insists all men are not like that. Clark concedes there might be some exceptions, but ultimately men strive to achieve as much as possible to increase status amongst men.

Asking how they met, Clark correctly deduces the man gave Girlie a card, so she made the first move. He suggests she cut him loose, as they have no future. Clark correctly guesses they have a daddy-daughter dynamic.

Clark asks Girlie what she knows about the man's family. She has never met any of them, but saw a photo of his wife, and he often shares photos and videos of his three kids. Clark is surprised, saying he has let her in more than usual, but no more.

Girlie describes when her sister and she left home. She was six and her sister 17. Their father, who had never touched her, shook Girlie's hand to say goodbye.

Girlie and Clark share their bucket lists. He later describes his first wife and the failure of their marriage. Clark tells her it is her turn to tell a story.

Recounting the visit to her sister, Girlie describes how they drank constantly and reminisced. This includes her being tied in the tub. Strangely, Girlie and her sister remember their departure differently; her sister contends their dad never shook Girlie's hand.

She goes on to share that after flying to Oklahoma upon discovering her pregnancy, she immediately began bleeding. The miscarriage lasted the whole visit, but after she quietly prayed to be cleansed during a rain dance hosted by her sister's partner, Eagle, the bleeding stopped the next morning.

Clark declares Girlie has "won". After she quietly tips him $500, they have a teary goodbye, having connected deeply on the journey.

== Cast ==
- Sean Penn as Clark
- Dakota Johnson as Girlie

== Production ==
The film was originally conceived as a stage play in New York City. In October 2017, it was announced that Daisy Ridley would star in the film, based on a spec script by Christy Hall. That December, the script was included on that year's "Black List" of the most-liked unproduced scripts in Hollywood. In June 2021, it was announced that Johnson had replaced Ridley and that Penn was also cast in the film. Johnson was the one to initially suggest Penn and personally sent him the script.

Principal photography occurred in New York City and in Jersey City, New Jersey, in December 2022. It was shot in 16 days. The film entered post-production in January 2023.

All scenes taking place within the cab were shot on a sound stage using on-set virtual production, consisting of large LED video screens on which digital environments were rendered. The actors performed in front of the screens in real time.

== Release ==
Daddio premiered at the 50th Telluride Film Festival on September 1, 2023. It also screened at the 2023 Toronto International Film Festival on September 10, 2023, as part of its special screening program. Later that month, Sony Pictures Classics acquired distribution rights to the film for North and Latin America as well as some European and Asian territories, scheduling it for a theatrical release sometime in 2024. It was released in the United States and Canada on June 28, 2024.

Daddio was released in Germany June 27, and in Argentina June 28, 2024. The film was scheduled to be released in Russia and the CIS on July 11, 2024.

== Reception ==
=== Box office ===
In the United States and Canada, the film made $424,091 from 628 theaters in its opening weekend.

=== Critical response ===
On the review aggregator website Rotten Tomatoes, 76% of 113 critics' reviews are positive, with an average rating of 6.9/10. The website's consensus reads: "A ruminative chamber piece on wheels, Daddio feels expansive thanks to Dakota Johnson and Sean Penn's compelling rapport." Metacritic, which uses a weighted average, assigned the film a score of 62 out of 100, based on 25 critics, indicating "generally favorable" reviews.

Peter DeBruge of Variety gave the film a positive review and wrote, "Every aspect of Daddio is designed to spark conversation. But it’s sweeter and more satisfying than you might expect..." Stephen Farber of The Hollywood Reporter also gave the film a positive review, calling it "A deftly executed debut feature." Todd McCarthy of Deadline Hollywood also gave the film a positive review and wrote, "Sean Penn is at his absolute best here in a tremendously engaging performance as a salty working-class guy with an endless supply of opinions and ways of drawing out his passengers, while Dakota Johnson more than holds her own as a game passenger increasingly willing to share her problems with the amateur shrink behind the wheel."
