= Steve Sarowitz =

American businessman

- Born: 1965 or 1966 (age 60–61)
- Education: University of Illinois at Urbana–Champaign
- Occupation: Businessman
- Known for: Founder of Paylocity
- Spouse: Jessica Sarowitz

Steve Sarowitz (born 1965/1966) is an American billionaire businessman, and the founder of Paylocity.

== Early life ==
Sarowitz earned a bachelor's degree from the University of Illinois at Urbana–Champaign.

== Career ==
Sarowitz owned 44% of Paylocity at its IPO in March 2014, and 28% in April 2019.

Sarowitz has donated hundreds of millions of dollars to charity and plans to donate most of his wealth in the next decade.

== It Ends with Us controversy ==
On December 20, 2024, Blake Lively filed a complaint with the California Civil Rights department against Sarowitz, Justin Baldoni, and others based on allegations regarding sexual harassment and retaliation related to the 2024 film It Ends with Us. The timing of the complaint was coordinated with an article in The New York Times detailing Lively's accusations. She followed the complaint with a formal lawsuit eleven days later.

On December 31, 2025, Sarowitz, along with Baldoni and other associates filed a $250 million libel lawsuit against The New York Times, alleging that a Times article about the dispute defamed them by misrepresenting communications and spreading a “categorically false” narrative.

On January 16, 2025, Sarowitz, along with Baldoni and other associates, filed a $400 million defamation countersuit against Lively, her husband Ryan Reynolds, and her publicist. They alleged that Lively's claims were false and amounted to civil extortion.

Lively filed an amended complaint on February 19, 2025 which included a statement she alleges was said by Sarowitz that: "I will protect the studio like Israel protected itself from Hamas. There were 39,000 dead bodies. There will be two dead bodies when I’m done. Minimum. Not dead, but you’re dead to me. So that kind of dead. But dead to a lot of people. If they ever get me to that point. Then I’ll make it worth their while. Because I’m gonna spend a lot of money to make sure the studio is protected." An audio recording later confirmed he made the statement.

In April 2025, a man set fire to a trash can in Sarowitz's driveway and threatened via text to kidnap his daughter, demanding money in exchange for his daughter's safety. "If you guys are prepared to spend a hundred million to ruin the lives of Ms. [Blake] Lively and her family, we are sure you can spare a few for your daughter,” the text reportedly read, referencing an allegation in Lively's lawsuit. Sarowitz subsequently hired 24/7 security.

Sarowitz's lawsuit against Lively, Reynolds and The New York Times was dismissed in June 2025.

Lively's individual claims against Sarowitz, Baldoni, and others were dismissed in April 2026 leaving a narrowed set of claims against Wayfarer Studios. In May 2026, two weeks before trial, Lively settled her lawsuit by voluntarily dismissing her remaining claims against Wayfarer Studios, receiving no monetary compensation.

== Personal life ==
Sarowitz is married to Jessica; the couple lives in Highland Park, Illinois. He was raised Jewish, but later embraced the Baháʼí Faith.
