= It Ends with Us (film) =

2024 film by Justin Baldoni

- Theatrical release poster
- Directed by: Justin Baldoni
- Screenplay by: Christy Hall
- Based on: It Ends with Us by Colleen Hoover
- Produced by: Alex Saks; Jamey Heath; Christy Hall
- Starring: Blake Lively; Justin Baldoni; Jenny Slate; Hasan Minhaj; Brandon Sklenar
- Cinematography: Barry Peterson
- Edited by: Oona Flaherty; Robb Sullivan
- Music by: Rob Simonsen; Duncan Blickenstaff
- Production companies: Columbia Pictures; Wayfarer Studios
- Distributed by: Sony Pictures Releasing
- Release dates: August 6, 2024 (AMC Lincoln Square); August 9, 2024 (United States)
- Running time: 130 minutes
- Country: United States
- Language: English
- Budget: $25 million
- Box office: $351 million

It Ends with Us is a 2024 American romantic drama film directed by Justin Baldoni and written by Christy Hall, based on the 2016 novel by Colleen Hoover. The film stars Blake Lively alongside Baldoni, Brandon Sklenar, Jenny Slate, and Hasan Minhaj. The story follows florist Lily Bloom (Lively), whose abusive relationship with neurosurgeon Ryle Kincaid (Baldoni) is compounded when her ex-boyfriend Atlas Corrigan (Sklenar) re-enters her life.

Principal photography on It Ends with Us took place from mid-2023 to early 2024, with pauses due to the 2023 WGA strike and the 2023 SAG-AFTRA strike. It Ends with Us premiered at the AMC Lincoln Square in New York City on August 6, 2024, and was released in the United States on August 9 by Sony Pictures Releasing. The film received mixed reviews from critics and was a box-office success, grossing $351 million against a $25 million budget. The production of the film was mired in controversy due to disputes between Lively and Baldoni, leading to extensive litigation.

== Plot ==
Lily Bloom returns to her hometown of Plethora, Maine, to deliver a eulogy at her recently deceased father Andrew's funeral. From the podium, she announces that she will list five of her favorite things about him, then stands in silence before walking off.

Back home in Boston, she meets handsome, charming neurosurgeon Ryle Kincaid. They flirt before Ryle is abruptly called away for emergency surgery. While renovating the building she bought to open her flower shop, Lily meets Allysa, a friendly woman who is looking for work. Lily hires her and later learns that she is Ryle's sister.

At Allysa's birthday party, Ryle tells Lily he is infatuated with her. They kiss, but she declines to go further, citing that he is only interested in casual sex while she is seeking a committed relationship. Lily spends the night at Ryle's apartment, and he asks her out the next morning, which she accepts. A while later, Lily takes Ryle to a new restaurant, Root, to introduce him to her mother Jenny, and discovers that Root's owner and head chef is Lily's high school boyfriend, Atlas Corrigan.

Flashbacks reveal that Andrew was physically abusive toward Jenny, and that Lily found Atlas living in an empty house next door after he ran away from home to escape his mother's abusive boyfriend. Though Lily and Atlas fell in love, Andrew severely beat Atlas upon finding them in bed together, resulting in the latter becoming hospitalized. Atlas later left to join the Marines, but promised Lily that he would resume their relationship upon returning.

One morning, Ryle burns his hand while cooking breakfast. When Lily tries to help, he slaps her, but he immediately apologizes, insisting that it was an accident. While Ryle, Lily, Allysa, and Allysa's husband Marshall are at Root, Atlas notices Lily's bruised eye and Ryle's bandaged hand. Atlas confronts Lily in the restroom, imploring her to leave Ryle. Ryle finds them together and assumes the worst, leading to a physical altercation between the men, which culminates in Atlas ejecting and banning Ryle.

Atlas visits Lily's shop to apologize for the incident, but gives her his phone number in case she ever needs it. Lily confides in Ryle about her parents' abusive relationship. While visiting Allysa and Marshall in the hospital after the birth of their daughter, Ryle proposes to Lily, which she accepts, and they elope shortly after.

Ryle later finds Atlas's phone number hidden in Lily's phone case. During the ensuing argument, he pushes Lily down the stairs. She falls unconscious and awakens to him tending to her injuries, though he claims she accidentally fell and he tried to catch her.

A local magazine publishes an article interviewing top new business owners, which includes Lily’s shop and Atlas’ restaurant Root. He reveals he named it in Lily's honor. Ryle reads the article, becoming overcome with jealousy, then sexually assaults Lily.

Lily escapes, seeking out Atlas, who takes her to a hospital, where she discovers that she is pregnant. She stays with him for a few days, during which he confesses that he had planned to commit suicide on the night she found him. However, Lily inspired Atlas to continue living.

When Lily confides in Allysa about Ryle's treatment of her, who then reveals that, as a small child, Ryle accidentally fatally shot their brother Emerson with their father's gun; his unresolved trauma manifests as uncontrollable bouts of rage. Allysa implores Lily to leave Ryle. Lily moves out, though he begs her to return, promising to undergo psychological counseling and stop the abuse.

Lily later gives birth to a daughter, whom they name Emerson. Upon seeing Ryle hold her for the first time, Lily tells Ryle that she wants a divorce. He initially resists, but agrees when she asks how he would react if Emerson were being abused by a partner. Hoping that she has finally broken the cycle of abuse within her family, Lily tells Emerson, "It ends with us."

Months later, Lily and Jenny take Emerson to Andrew's grave, where Lily leaves the blank eulogy on his headstone. She later encounters Atlas at the farmers' market and tells him that she is no longer with Ryle, and they smile at each other.

== Cast ==
- Blake Lively as Lily Bloom
  - Isabela Ferrer as young Lily
- Justin Baldoni as Ryle Kincaid, Lily's husband
- Jenny Slate as Allysa Kincaid, Ryle's older sister
- Brandon Sklenar as Atlas Corrigan
  - Alex Neustaedter as young Atlas
- Hasan Minhaj as Marshall
- Kevin McKidd as Andrew Bloom, Lily's late father
- Amy Morton as Jenny Bloom, Lily's widowed mother
- Robert Clohessy as the Sheriff
- Robyn Lively as Ms. Byland
- Emily Baldoni as Dr. Julie

== Production ==
In July 2019, Justin Baldoni optioned the novel for a film adaptation, to be produced through his Wayfarer Studios company. In January 2023, Blake Lively was cast in the role of Lily Bloom. Baldoni, who plays Ryle Kincaid, also signed on as director with Christy Hall adapting the script. In April 2023, Brandon Sklenar was cast to play the role of Atlas.

Principal photography began in Hoboken, New Jersey, on May 5, 2023, with shooting taking place along 10th and Bloomfield Streets. The production took over Field Colony, a workspace and art gallery, for six weeks, transforming it into a cafe then Lily Bloom's florist shop. In mid-May 2023, filming moved to Chatham, New Jersey, where scenes were shot at Fair Mount Cemetery. Later that same month, Hasan Minhaj was announced to have joined the cast.

The next month, production had to temporarily pause due to the 2023 WGA strike. Just over half of the film was completed when production shut down. The production was still on hold when the 2023 SAG-AFTRA strike began on July 14, 2023. Filming resumed in the Newport neighborhood of Jersey City, New Jersey, on January 5, 2024. That same month, Isabela Ferrer and Alex Neustaedter joined the cast as the younger versions of Lily and Atlas, respectively.

== Music ==
Rob Simonsen and Duncan Blickenstaff composed the film's score. Madison Gate Records released the soundtrack, coinciding with the film's theatrical release date.

== Marketing ==
The first trailer was released on May 26, 2024 and featured "My Tears Ricochet" by Taylor Swift. The subsequent marketing campaign received a mixed response, not unlike the book itself. Social media users and outlets observed mixed messages related to the flower-focused campaign ("grab your girls, wear your florals”) and the film's content. For example, Bridgette Stumpf of The Hollywood Reporter wrote on the issue, "By glossing over its domestic violence content in the film's marketing, and by not providing any content warnings prior to the start of the film, It Ends With Us ultimately fails the survivors it is supposed to advocate for." In contrast, when asked about domestic violence in an interview, Lively said she saw the move as, "a story that covers domestic violence but it’s not about domestic violence.” Kathleen Walsh identified the tension in this approach for Glamour. Meanwhile, the film's official TikTok page released videos of pop-up flower shops featuring Lively and Baldoni, as well as Hoover. Additionally, due to the delay in the film's release and a pre-planned release of Lively's haircare line, Blake Brown, there was a co-mingling of her role as an actor and as an entrepreneur. While there was some discussion on-line regarding tensions between Lively and Baldoni, social media users increased speculation about the alleged rift grew on platforms such as TikTok (where the book was massively popular among the "BookTok" subcommunity) in videos that noted Baldoni's absence from joint press events.

== Release ==
It Ends with Us premiered at the AMC Lincoln Square in New York City on August 6, 2024. The film was originally set to be released theatrically in the United States on February 9, 2024, and June 21, 2024, but the release date was pushed back to August 9, 2024. It was released earlier on August 7 in Belgium, Finland, the Philippines, and Sweden.

It Ends with Us was released on VOD on September 24, 2024, and was released on Blu-ray and DVD on November 5, 2024. It became available to stream starting on December 9 on Netflix.

== Reception ==
=== Box office ===
It Ends with Us grossed $148.5 million in the United States and Canada, and $202.5 million in other territories, for a worldwide total of $351 million. Deadline Hollywood calculated the film's net profit as $207 million, accounting for production budgets, marketing, and other costs; box office grosses, merchandise, television and streaming, and home media revenues placing it sixth on their list of 2024's "Most Valuable Blockbusters".

In the United States and Canada, It Ends with Us was released alongside Borderlands and Cuckoo, and was projected to gross $23–30 million in its opening weekend, with some estimates going as high as $40–50 million. The film made $24 million on its first day, including $7 million from Thursday night previews. It went on to debut to $50 million, finishing second behind holdover Deadpool & Wolverine. A PostTrak survey of moviegoers reported that 30% said they came because of Lively, while another 30% said it was because of the book. It marked the first time since 1990 that two films separately starring a married Hollywood couple (in this case, It Ends with Us star Blake Lively and Deadpool & Wolverine star Ryan Reynolds) occupied the number one and two spots at the box office simultaneously, and the first time two films grossed at least $50 million in the same weekend in the month of August. In its second weekend the film made $23.8 million (a drop of 52.4%), finishing in third. The film crossed $100 million domestically on August 19, after eleven days in theaters. It ended its theatrical run after three months.

=== Critical response ===
Reception of the film from critics was mixed. On the review aggregator website Rotten Tomatoes, 55% of 198 critics' reviews are positive, with an average rating of 5.6/10. The website's consensus reads: "Earnestly performed if marred by clunky dialogue, It Ends with Us is surprisingly at its most graceful when handling the more provocative elements of its melodramatic source material." Metacritic, which uses a weighted average, assigned the film a score of 53 out of 100, based on 42 critics, indicating "mixed or average" reviews. Audiences polled by CinemaScore gave the film an average grade of "A–" on an A+ to F scale, while those surveyed by PostTrak gave it an 85% positive score, with 69% saying they would definitely recommend it.

Wendy Ide of The Observer gave the film three out of five stars, writing: "For a film that dips its Manolo-clad toe into the murky waters of domestic abuse, it's unexpectedly aspirational, almost frothy in tone." The Globe and Mail's Johanna Schneller praised Lively's performance, writing: "Beyond nailing Lily's exact shade of auburn hair, funky/sexy dress and vision-notebook stuffed with flowers, she also conveys her luminousness and strength, and reminds you how pleasurable it can be to watch a romantic thriller." Kevin Maher of The Times gave it 4 out of 5 stars, calling it "a glossy, sometimes soapy but always compelling adaptation."

Hannah Giorgis of The Atlantic was more critical, writing: "To young people who have become inured to the misery of modern life, there's a seductive premise in these novels: Relentless suffering can give way to freedom—and hot sex—if women want it badly enough. On-screen, performed by real people, it's not as convincing." The Sydney Morning Herald's reviewer Sandra Hall gave the film two and a half out of five stars, saying that it was "packed with erotic cliches overlaid with a rolling soundtrack of pop hits that includes songs by Taylor Swift and Lana Del Rey", and called the dialogue "risible".

== Potential sequel ==
In August 2024, following the release of the film, director Justin Baldoni acknowledged the potential for a film adaptation of the sequel novel It Starts with Us. However, he later stated that he might not return in his role as director, suggesting that Blake Lively direct the film instead. Baldoni's Wayfarer Studios holds the rights to It Ends with Us and It Starts with Us after acquiring them in 2019.

== Conflict between Lively and Baldoni ==
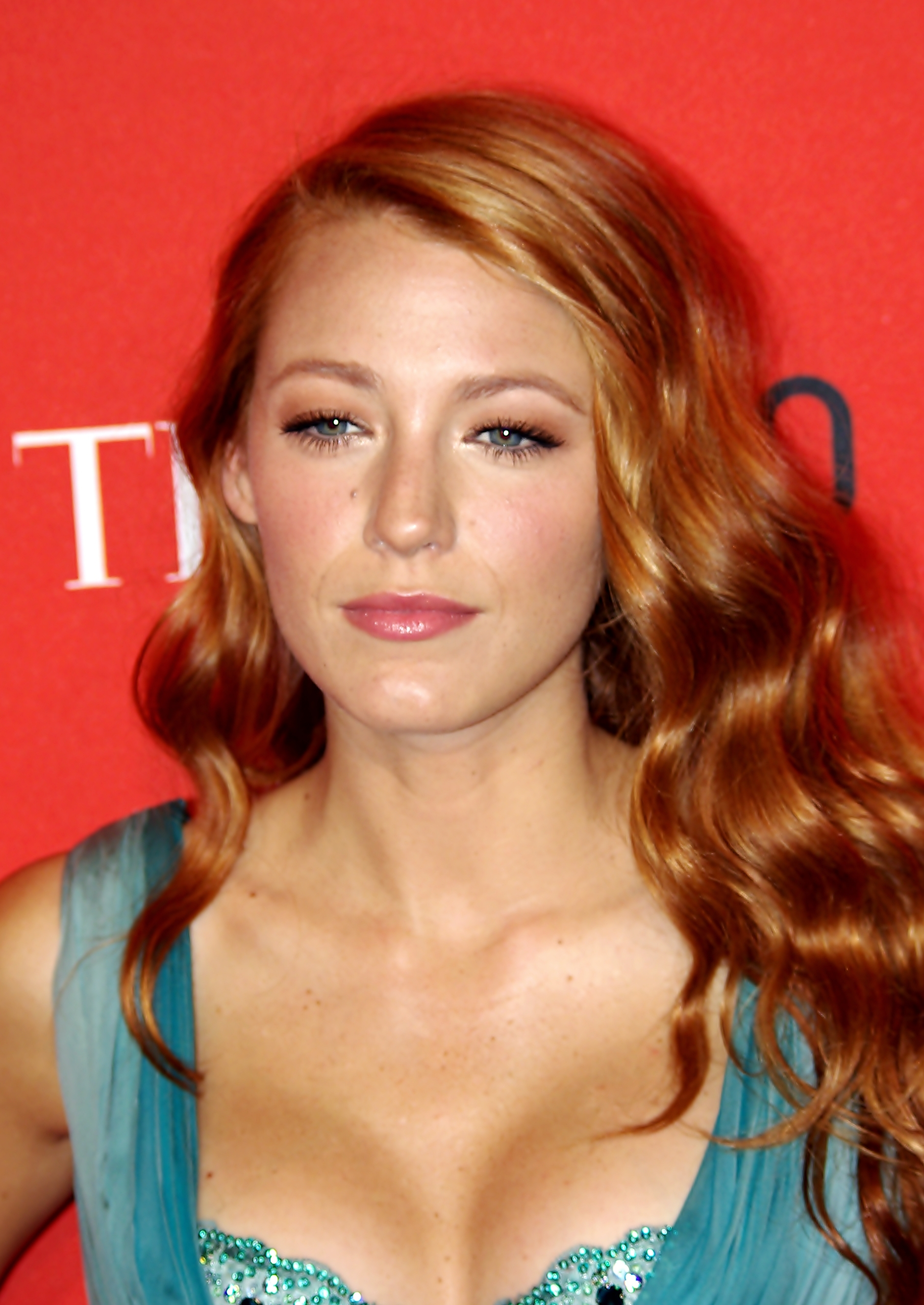
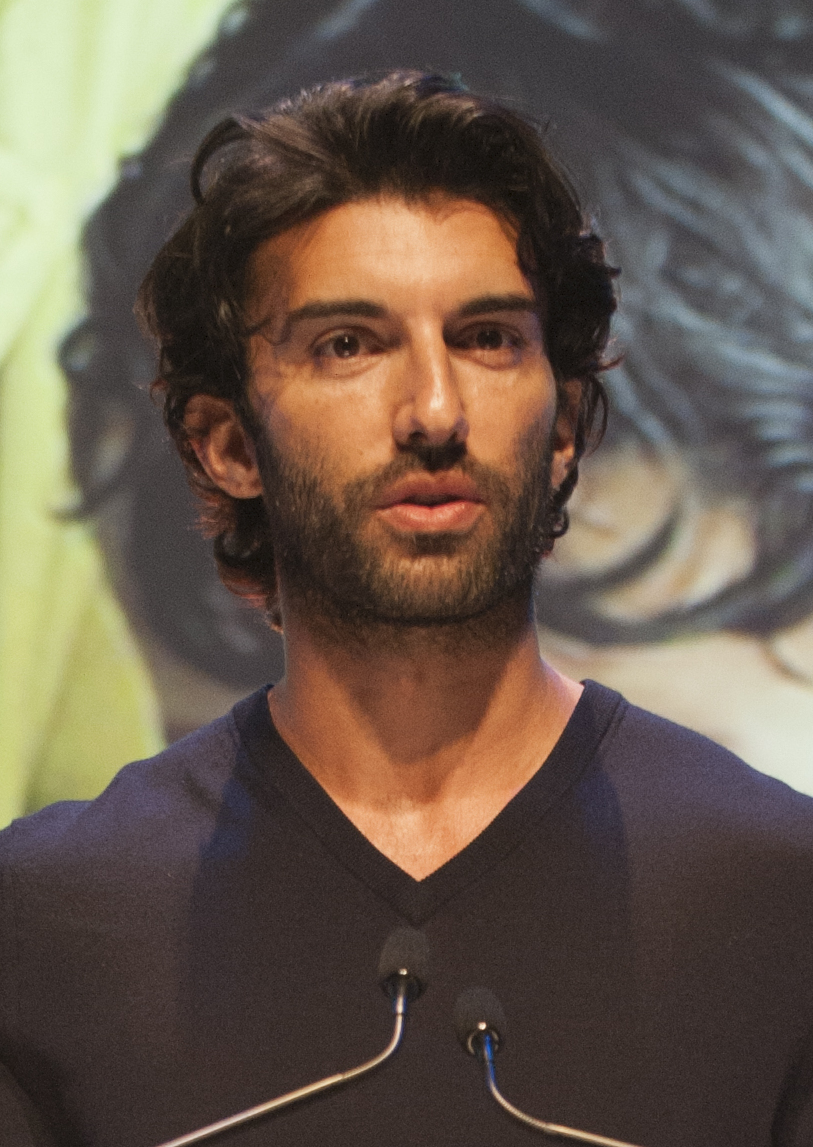
Actress Blake Lively (left; pictured in 2011) and director Justin Baldoni (pictured in 2017)

In August 2024,The Hollywood Reporter reported on internet speculation that a conflict had formed between Lively and Baldoni during the making of the film. They alleged that one source of the conflict may have been that Lively had her husband Ryan Reynolds write the scene in the film where the lead characters first meet. Additionally, during the post-production process, Lively commissioned a second cut of the film from editor Shane Reid. Reid had previously worked on the Marvel Cinematic Universe (MCU) film Deadpool & Wolverine (2024) starring Lively's husband, and the Lively-directed Taylor Swift music video "I Bet You Think About Me". The edit used in theaters, reportedly the version Lively preferred, was credited to Oona Flaherty and Robb Sullivan.

In August 2024, Baldoni hired public relations crisis manager Melissa Nathan. Sources told Variety that while they would not "articulate any legitimate transgressions from either party" that "the bad blood between the two is very real and the relationship may not be salvageable."

=== Sexual harassment and defamation legal action ===
On December 20, 2024, Lively filed a legal complaint with the California Civil Rights Department accusing Baldoni, producer Jamey Heath, and their studio Wayfarer of creating a hostile work environment and retaliating against her for reporting misconduct. According to the filings, she claimed Baldoni had improvised unwanted kissing and discussed his sex life, Heath had shown her a video of his wife giving birth naked, and both men repeatedly entered her makeup trailer uninvited while she was undressed, including when she was breastfeeding, among other inappropriate actions. Documents obtained by Lively via subpoena claimed to show that Baldoni and his agents ran a public relations campaign to damage her reputation, which involved social media manipulation, planting negative stories, and amplifying criticism of her. Lively alleged that this was done in retaliation for her raising concerns and seeking protections on set.

Lively's complaint, though filed privately, was published the following day in a The New York Times exposé by Megan Twohey, Mike McIntire and Julie Tate under the title "We Can Bury Anyone: Inside a Hollywood Smear Machine."

Baldoni was dropped by the talent agency WME in response to the allegations and reporting. He denied the allegations through his lawyer, alleging that the dispute was due to creative disagreements rather than misconduct, and denied the claim that he or his team were responsible for Lively’s bad press. The following day, Baldoni's publicist stated that his PR team had "sophomorically reveled" in the Lively coverage, yet "although we were prepared, we didn't have to do anything over the top to protect our client."

Lively's civil rights complaint also named businessman Steve Sarowitz, a co-founder of Wayfarer Studio; Jed Wallace and his company Street Relations Inc; crisis manager Melissa Nathan and her company The Agency Group PR LLC (TAG); and publicist Jennifer Abel and her company RWA Communications. She also filed a lawsuit against the same, except Wallace and Street Relations, alleging sexual harassment, planned public smear campaign, and causing her emotional distress. Baldoni's former publicist Stephanie Jones also filed a defamation lawsuit that alleged that her former employee Jennifer Abel and crisis communications manager Melissa Nathan attempted to cover up Baldoni's on-set behavior while It Ends With Us was being filmed. Jones' lawsuit also alleged that efforts were made to undermine her reputation.

In December 2024, Baldoni and the other plaintiffs responded with a $250 million lawsuit against The New York Times, saying that the newspaper had defamed them by publishing "'cherry-picked' and altered communications" which were "stripped of necessary context and deliberately spliced to mislead". They alleged that The Times conspired with Lively on a one-sided narrative and ignored evidence that contradicted her claims. In January 2025, Baldoni and his associates also filed a lawsuit against Lively, Reynolds and Leslie Sloane, Lively's PR representative, alleging extortion, defamation and breach of contract, seeking at least $400 million in damages. They alleged that Lively hijacked control of the film and then created false stories in the press portraying Baldoni as a sexual predator. In June 2025, the court dismissed Baldoni's lawsuits against both Lively and ''The New York Times'', finding the statements protected under litigation and reporting privileges. The suit against Lively was formally ended in November 2025 after Baldoni's team did not move to revive it. Baldoni and Abel also filed a countersuit against Stephanie Jones, alleging that she had given Abel's private text messages to Lively and had falsely told Lively that a smear campaign had been initiated against her. Jones filed a motion to dismiss, but in March 2026, the judge allowed the case to move forward on the allegation that Jones knowingly fed Lively’s team a false narrative.

In April 2026, the court dismissed 10 of Lively's 13 claims, including her sexual harassment allegations against Baldoni. The judge ruled she could not pursue the harassment claims under federal law because she worked on the film as an independent contractor, not an employee. Her remaining claims were allowed to proceed to trial.

Lively's remaining claims were settled out of court on May 4, 2026, two weeks before the scheduled trial. A court filing later confirmed the settlement involved no financial payout.
