= Christy Hall =

American film director and screenwriter

- Years active: 2020–present

Christy Hall is an American screenwriter and film director.

== Career ==
She is the screenwriter and director of the 2023 feature film Daddio starring Dakota Johnson and Sean Penn. Daddio is her feature directorial debut. Hall is also the screenwriter for 2024 film It Ends With Us, starring Blake Lively. She also co-developed with Jonathan Entwistle the 2020 Netflix series I Am Not Okay with This. Earlier in 2022, it was announced that Hall would be adapting Liane Moriarty's 2013 novel The Husband's Secret for a film adaptation directed by Kat Coiro. In September 2026, it was announced that the limited series entitled Victoria, which she serves as creator, writer and executive producer, was ordered by Hulu, starring Li Jun Li.

== Filmography ==
Television

Year	Title	Writer	Creator	Executive Producer	Notes
2020	I Am Not Okay with This	Yes	Developer	Yes	
TBA	Victoria	Yes	Yes	Yes	

Film

Year	Title	Director	Writer	Producer
2023	Daddio	Yes	Yes	Yes
2024	It Ends with Us	No	Yes	Yes

Additional literary material only

- A Quiet Place: Day One (2024)
