= It Starts with Us =

2022 novel by Colleen Hoover

- First edition cover
- Author: Colleen Hoover
- Language: English
- Genre: Romance
- Publisher: Atria Books
- Publication date: October 18, 2022
- Publication place: New York
- Media type: Print (paperback)
- Pages: 336
- ISBN: 978-1-66800-122-6 (First edition)
- Preceded by: It Ends with Us

It Starts with Us is a romance novel by Colleen Hoover, published by Atria Books on October 18, 2022. It is the sequel to her 2016 best-selling novel It Ends with Us. The novel continues from where It Ends with Us ended and centers on the relationship between Lily and Atlas. It alternates chapters between the first-person narration of Lily and Atlas. The sequel was first announced in February 2022. It became Simon & Schuster's most pre-ordered book of all time. Hoover wrote the novel as a "thank you" to fans of the first novel.

== Plot ==
Lily Bloom unexpectedly runs into her former lover, Atlas Corrigan, on the streets of Boston, but their encounter is cut short. After dropping off her eleven-month-old daughter with her ex-husband Ryle Kincaid for his weekend with her, Lily is unable to stop thinking about her run-in with Atlas, but is hesitant to text him for fear of how Ryle may react.

Atlas' friend Theo convinces him to text Lily, but Atlas is disappointed by her curt response. When Lily returns to her apartment that evening, she finds Ryle and Emerson inside. He requests to start having overnight visits with Emerson, but Lily asserts that Emerson will not be allowed to stay with Ryle overnight until she is old enough to speak. She also requests that Ryle return her apartment key, which he begrudgingly does.

Atlas' restaurants are being vandalized, but he chooses not to report it to the police after he discovers some food missing, empathizing with the vandal as he too was once homeless and starving. While inspecting some of the damage, he receives a call from his estranged mother, Sutton, whom he hangs up on and immediately blocks.

While Atlas visits Lily at her flower shop, Ryle arrives unannounced. Nervous about how Ryle will react to seeing Atlas, Lily hides Atlas in a closet. That night, Atlas invites Lily on a date, and she accepts. She drops off Emerson with her best friend, Ryle's sister Allysa. While on the drive to their date, Lily falls asleep. Instead of waking her, Atlas occupies himself by reading journal entries Lily wrote about him when they were kids.

When Lily returns to pick up Emerson, she finds Ryle watching Finding Nemo with her. Ryle is furious, having deduced that Emerson's middle name, Dory, is dedicated to Atlas because of the significance the movie had to Lily and Atlas when they were children, but Lily promises she chose the name unrelated to Atlas.

Sutton shows up at one of Atlas' restaurants and reveals that he has an eleven-year-old brother named Josh, who is missing. Later that night, Atlas waits at one of his restaurants to confront the vandal, who returns and is revealed to be Josh. Atlas takes Josh in, initially planning to return him to Sutton, but changes his mind after witnessing her abusing Josh.

While attending a wedding together, Atlas notices a heart-shaped tattoo on Lily's collarbone. After she tells him he was the reason she got the tattoo, they share a kiss, and have sex later that night. Atlas leaves early the next morning to take care of Josh, leaving Lily a note. Ryle arrives at Lily's apartment; when he sees undergarments strewn around her living room, he assaults Lily in a jealous rage. She flees the apartment and collects Emerson from her mother's house. Lily takes Emerson to Atlas' house, where Lily and Atlas officially define their relationship.

Ryle drunkenly sends Lily aggressive texts throughout the following days. Eventually, he shows up at her flower shop. Lily says she will be talking to a lawyer about his custody of their daughter. Ryle goes to Atlas's restaurant and assaults him. Atlas does not fight back, instead trying to talk him down. Ryle is frustrated, but ends up leaving.

While at Emerson's birthday party, Ryle tries to talk to Lily, but she refuses to speak with him alone, saying she will only converse with him if Allysa and her husband Marshall are there. When the four meet, Lily delivers an ultimatum: Ryle must attend anger management courses, and his visits with Emerson be supervised. Ryle is enraged, but ultimately agrees to her terms.

Meanwhile, Sutton implores Josh to come live with her, but he declines, insisting on living with his father in Vermont. Atlas takes Josh to see his father, but Josh changes his mind and wants to live with Atlas instead. Atlas meets with Sutton at his restaurant and requests full parental rights over Josh, with weekly family dinners at Atlas's restaurant, to which Sutton ultimately agrees.

Six months later, Atlas asks Lily to move in with him, and she accepts. A year and a half later, Theo helps a nervous Atlas go over his wedding vows to Lily, which include a reference to Finding Nemo.

== Reception ==
By the end of its release day, the novel sold 800,000 copies, a number that includes pre-orders and first-day sales. It Starts with Us debuted at number one on The New York Times fiction best-seller list for the week ending October 22, 2022. It was the third best-selling novel of the year according to Publishers Weekly, selling a total of 1,885,351 copies. The next year it was the second best-selling novel of 2023, selling a total of 1,244,471 copies.

In its starred review, Publishers Weekly called it a "stunning sequel" that showcases "the author's talent for creating nuanced and empathetic characters". Kirkus Reviews wrote, "Through palpable tension balanced with glimmers of hope, Hoover beautifully captures the heartbreak and joy of starting over." Marianka Swain of The Daily Telegraph gave the novel 2 out of 5 stars, describing Hoover's writing quality as "closer to Fifty Shades of Grey, a strange mix of twee and graphic, plus the added irritant of solemn therapy-speak pronouncements". Swain also lamented, "She [Hoover] favours blunt dialogue and inner monologues over description, subtext or character development." Alice Giddings of Metro wrote, "While it doesn't have the grit or the emotional pain and catharsis of the first book, Colleen's latest work is exactly what it needs to be, which is the light at the end of the tunnel."

It Starts with Us was named WHSmith's Book of the Year for 2022.

== Film adaptation ==
Justin Baldoni's Wayfarer Studios holds the rights to It Ends with Us and It Starts with Us after acquiring them in 2019. In August 2024, following the release of the film adaptation of It Ends with Us, director Justin Baldoni acknowledged the potential for a film adaptation of the sequel novel. However, he later stated that he would not return in his role as director, suggesting that Blake Lively direct the film instead.
