= Southasia Magazine =

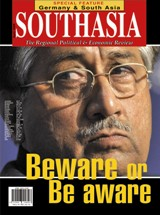
- SOUTHASIA Magazine, 1 April 2008
- Editor: Syed Jawaid Iqbal
- Categories: Newsmagazine
- Frequency: Monthly
- Publisher: Syed Jawaid Iqbal
- First issue: 1977
- Company: CMC Pvt. Ltd, SOUTHASIA Publications
- Country: Pakistan
- Based in: Karachi
- Language: English
- Website: Southasia
- ISSN: 1816-1243

Southasia Magazine is a Pakistani/English-language political and news magazine published from Pakistan. The magazine publishes news and analysis about South Asia and international affairs. It is edited and published by Syed Jawaid Iqbal, and is distributed in the United States by JAYEYE Associates.

Southasia Magazine was formerly called Thirdworld International which was established in 1977. It changed its name in 1997. It is a certified member of the All Pakistan Newspapers Society (APNS).
