= Magnetic Man (disambiguation) =

Magnetic Man is an English electronic music project.

Magnetic Man, Magnet Man or variants may also refer to:

== Arts, entertainment and media ==
- Magnetic Man (album), 2010, by Magnetic Man
- The Magnetic Man, a 2009 Finnish documentary film
- The Magnetic Man, a 1968 novel by Norman A. Daniels based on the television series The Avengers
- The Magnet Man, a 2023 multinational film directed by Gust Van Den Berghe

=== Fictional characters ===
- Magnet Man, in the Japanese video game franchise Mega Man
- Magnet Man, in the American animated series Mighty Man and Yukk
- Magnet Man, in the American animated series The Plastic Man Comedy/Adventure Show
- Magnetic Men, by Amalgam Comics
- The Magnet Men, in the American animated series Underdog

== People with the name ==
- Magnet Man, Barbadian musician
- Magnetic Man, a nickname of Malaysian entertainer Liew Thow Lin (1930–2013)
- Magnetic Man, a nickname of Etibar Elchyev, featured in the television series Man Vs Weird
- Magnet Man, a nickname of English footballer Johnny Mullins (born 1985)

== See also ==
- All pages with titles containing Magnetic/Magnet Man/Men
- Dapper Dan The Magnetic Man, a toy
- Magno the Magnetic Man, a Quality Comics character
- Human magnetism
- Magneto (disambiguation) § Fictional characters
- Magneto Man, a character from the animated cartoon series The Super 6
