= The Gateway Pundit =

American far-right fake news website

- Website type: Fake news; Far-right politics
- Available in: English
- Owner: Jim Hoft
- Creator: Jim Hoft
- Editor: Jim Hoft
- Revenue: $3.1 million (2023)
- Website: thegatewaypundit.com
- Registration: Optional, required to comment
- Launched: October 23, 2004; 22 years ago

The Gateway Pundit (TGP) is an American far-right fake news website. The website is known for publishing falsehoods, hoaxes, and conspiracy theories. Founded in 2004 by Jim Hoft, The Gateway Pundit expanded from a one-person enterprise into a multi-employee operation, supported primarily by advertising revenue. During the 2016 U.S. presidential campaign, the site received over a million unique visitors per day.

In September 2021, Google demonetized the site for publishing misinformation. In April 2024, Hoft announced that the TGP parent company, TGP Communications, had filed for Chapter 11 bankruptcy, blaming multiple defamation lawsuits. The bankruptcy case was dismissed in July 2024, with the judge finding it had been filed in bad faith to avoid the lawsuits against the site.

== History ==
The Gateway Pundit was founded prior to the 2004 United States presidential election, according to its founder, Jim Hoft, to "speak the truth" and to "expose the wickedness of the left". The website's name makes reference to the Gateway Arch in the city of St. Louis, Missouri, where Hoft resided as of February 2018. He operates the site from Ellisville, a western suburb.

In 2016, the site provided favorable coverage of Donald Trump's presidential campaign and, after Trump's election, was granted press credentials by the White House. A 2017 study by the Berkman Klein Center for Internet & Society at Harvard University found that The Gateway Pundit was the fourth most-shared source among Trump supporters on Twitter during the 2016 election, behind Fox News, The Hill and Breitbart News.

A study by the Center for Countering Digital Hate found that The Gateway Pundit earned up to $1.1 million in Google Ad revenue between November 2020 and July 2021. Twitter permanently suspended Hoft's account (@gatewaypundit) on February 6, 2021, for repeatedly publishing misinformation about the 2020 U.S. presidential election, but it was reinstated on December 16, 2022, following Elon Musk's acquisition of Twitter.

=== Trump-era White House press credentials ===
In February 2017, Hoft and The Gateway Pundit's Lucian Wintrich, a 28-year-old writer and artist, were granted White House press credentials by the Trump administration. Wintrich has collaborated with Milo Yiannopoulos, the former editor at Breitbart News.

As official correspondents, Hoft and Wintrich were able to attend all press briefings and address their questions to the White House press secretary. In an interview, Wintrich said they would be "reporting far more fairly than a lot of the very left-wing outlets that are currently occupying the briefing room" and "doing a little trolling of the media in general here". According to Wintrich, The Gateway Pundit's mission in the White House was "to help drain the press swamp" by covering the press corps' "very leftist and biased reporting", and to alleviate what he saw as bias among reporters in the White House press corps.

On August 14, 2020, after President Trump called on invited Gateway Pundit reporter Alicia Powe for a question at his televised White House press briefing, the White House Correspondents' Association president told the Washington Examiner that including Powe as a guest was an "outrageous" violation of the group's social distancing guidelines during the COVID-19 pandemic.

=== Maricopa County press credentials ===
In November 2022, Jordan Conradson, a reporter for The Gateway Pundit (along with the publisher TGP Communications, LLC), filed suit (represented by Marc Randazza) against Maricopa County, Arizona, because Conradson was denied a press pass. Although a lower court refused to issue a preliminary injunction, the Ninth Circuit Court of Appeals granted the injunction, saying that the denial violated the First Amendment – it was not "viewpoint neutral". To the contrary, the Ninth Circuit found "that a predominant reason for the County denying Conradson a press pass was the viewpoint expressed in his writings".

== False stories and conspiracy theories ==
The Gateway Pundit is known as a source of viral falsehoods and hoaxes. It has been described by the Harvard Journal of Law & Technology as one of the websites that "primarily propagate fake news", by Newsweek as a fake news website, and by CNN as a website "prone to peddling conspiracy theories".

In August 2019, journalism professors Erik P. Bucy and John E. Newhagen observed that "the most aggressive fake news sites and associated YouTube channels, such as InfoWars, The Gateway Pundit, and The Daily Stormer, are routinely sued by victims of these published reports for libel and defamation." As a result of a number of lawsuits against The Gateway Pundit over its false stories, it was reported in March 2018 that Hoft had told his writers to be more careful: "I don't want any more lawsuits so we have to be really careful with what we put up." Hoft said that he believed the lawsuits were "part of a multi-pronged effort to attack media outlets on the right".

In November 2019, the Wikipedia community deprecated The Gateway Pundit as an untrustworthy source of information, due to it "publishing hoax articles and reporting conspiracy theories as fact".

In July 2021, a spokesperson for Google said that the company had demonetized The Gateway Pundit's homepage and some of its articles: "We have strict publisher policies that prohibit content promoting anti-vaccine theories, COVID-19 misinformation, and false claims about the 2020 U.S. presidential election – and our enforcement can be as targeted as demonetizing a specific page. We already actioned the majority of pages shared from this report back in 2020 or early 2021 and similarly stopped serving ads on the site's homepage last year. We will continue to take appropriate action if new content is uploaded that violates our policies."

In September 2021, Google demonetized the entire site. A Google spokesman said "We gave the Gateway Pundit ample notice to address persistent policy violations before we took action. We will not serve Google ads on the site until they can comply with our guidelines." The decision took place a few days ahead of the airing of a French documentary in which a Google representative was confronted with printouts of ads on the site.

=== 2016 election ===
The Gateway Pundit promoted false rumors about voter fraud and Hillary Clinton's health. Specifically, rumors of Hillary Clinton's poor health were disseminated via The Gateway Pundit's articles entitled, "Breaking: 71% of Doctors Say Hillary Health Concerns Serious, Possibly Disqualifying!" and "Wow! Did Hillary Clinton Just Suffer a Seizure on Camera?" Regarding voter fraud, The Gateway Pundit published an unsubstantiated report during the 2016 presidential election from the Internet Research Agency, a Russian troll farm, claiming that Republicans had accused Broward County, Florida officials of tampering with mail-in ballots.

=== Misidentifying shooters and terrorists ===
The Gateway Pundit has a record of misidentifying perpetrators of shootings and terror attacks.

Shortly after the 2017 white supremacist rally in Charlottesville, in which a person drove a vehicle into a crowd of counter-protesters, killing one, The Gateway Pundit falsely identified a young man from Michigan as the driver. After the misidentification took place, the family received several death threats and went into hiding. The Michigan man and his father filed a defamation lawsuit against the publication and other related parties.

In October 2017, The Gateway Pundit published an article falsely implicating an innocent person as the shooter in the 2017 Las Vegas shooting. The article was promoted by Google as a "top story" for searches for the man's name. The Gateway Pundit asserted that New York Times reporter Rukmini Callimachi had reported that ISIS may have evidence that it was behind the shooting, but Callimachi denied that she had ever made such an assertion.

The Gateway Pundit promoted conspiracy theories about the Stoneman Douglas High School shooting. In February 2018, The Gateway Pundit published an article erroneously stating that school shooter Nikolas Cruz was a registered Democrat, citing a registered Broward County voter with a similar name. The website later corrected its mistake. Later that month, The Gateway Pundit was one of a number of far-right websites that pushed the claim that at least one of the teenage survivors of the Stoneman Douglas High School shooting was a deep state pawn, alleging that David Hogg's gun control activism was being coached by his retired FBI agent father.

In July 2018, The Gateway Pundit falsely claimed that a man arrested with bomb-making equipment and illegal weapons had been a "leftist antifa terrorist". The individual in question was however a conservative whose Facebook profile was littered with pro-Second Amendment memes.

In August 2018, The Gateway Pundit falsely identified a Reddit user as the perpetrator of the Jacksonville Landing shooting.

=== 2020 election ===
In November 2020, The Gateway Pundit erroneously stated that a software glitch during the 2020 United States presidential election led to 10,000 votes in Rock County, Wisconsin, being "moved" from incumbent president Donald Trump to his opponent, Joe Biden; the article was then promoted by Eric Trump, President Trump's son and executive vice president of the Trump Organization as part of Donald Trump's attempts to overturn the 2020 United States presidential election. The article was disputed by the Associated Press, which said that the supposed discrepancy was caused by a technical error in AP's reporting of results obtained from Rock County's election website, an error that was resolved within minutes and did not pertain to the counting of actual ballots. Rock County clerk Lisa Tollefson said that The Gateway Pundit reported incorrect information, and that the county stood by the final tally. The Wisconsin Elections Commission later added: "The AP's error in no way reflects any problem with how Rock County counted or posted unofficial results. The WEC has confirmed with Rock County that their unofficial results reporting was always accurate. ... These errors have nothing to do with Wisconsin's official results, which are triple checked at the municipal, county and state levels before they are certified."

In December 2020, The Gateway Pundit falsely claimed that Georgia Secretary of State Brad Raffensperger's brother "Ron" worked for a Chinese tech firm. Raffensperger's brother's name was not Ron and he did not work for a Chinese company.

In August 2021, The Daily Beast reported that according to a senior Trump White House official, Trump was seen holding printouts of articles from The Gateway Pundit during his attempts to overturn the 2020 election, and on one occasion gave an official an article from the site which alleged massive fraud in favor of Biden and told the official to act on it.

Days after the results of the 2021 Maricopa County presidential ballot audit were released, The Gateway Pundit published an altered version of the auditors' report which falsely stated, "the election should not be certified, and the reported results are not reliable." The Gateway Pundit wrote that it acquired the altered document from "Byrne". (Patrick Byrne, a staunch Trump supporter, was a major promoter of and donor to the Maricopa County audit.) Byrne denied he was the source of the document.

In October 2021, The Gateway Pundit used a study by the Poor People's Campaign to falsely claim that Democrats had used low-income voters to steal the election; the study had found that about 35% of the 2020 presidential electorate had household incomes below $50,000. PolitiFact rated the claim "Pants on Fire", finding that The Gateway Pundit had conflated voter outreach with voter fraud.

Analysis conducted in 2022 by researchers with the University of Washington's Center for an Informed Public and the Krebs Stamos Group found The Gateway Pundit was the second-most prolific purveyor of election misinformation on Twitter during the late months of 2020.

==== Defamation lawsuits ====
In December 2020, The Gateway Pundit was named as one of the defendants in a defamation lawsuit filed by Dominion Voting Systems executive Eric Coomer. Coomer asserted that the defendants had characterized him as a "traitor" and that as a result he was subjected to "multiple credible death threats". In May 2022, a Colorado district court judge rejected a motion to dismiss the lawsuit, writing that The Gateway Pundit's allegations "incited threats of real violence against Coomer, including posting an article advertising a million-dollar bounty on Coomer."

In December 2021, two Georgia election workers, Ruby Freeman and her daughter Wandrea' ArShaye Moss, sued The Gateway Pundit for defamation, alleging that the site and its owners had knowingly published false stories about them that "instigated a deluge of intimidation, harassment, and threats that has forced them to change their phone numbers, delete their online accounts, and fear for their physical safety". In response, the website doubled down on its false claims with an article titled "Ruby Freeman and Daughter Sue Gateway Pundit for Posting Video of Her Shoving Ballots Through Voting Machines Numerous Times – PLEASE HELP US Fight This Latest Lawsuit". The website and its owners filed a counterclaim alleging the lawsuit was intended to drive it out of business; the counterclaim was dismissed in 2023. The Hofts said their articles about Freeman and Moss were "either statements of opinion based on disclosed facts or statements of rhetorical hyperbole that no reasonable reader is likely to interpret as a literal statement of fact."

In April 2024, Hoft announced that the TGP parent company, TGP Communications, had filed for Chapter 11 bankruptcy due to the defamation lawsuits against it. TGP attributed the action to "progressive liberal lawfare attacks against our media outlet". That month, a court filing from the lawsuit revealed that the website's employees had expressed concern about plagiarism and the credibility of the website's contributors, including that of Jordan Conradson. Conradson had written stories for the website falsely accusing Freeman and Moss of fraud.

The election workers alleged the bankruptcy was a delay tactic and that TGP is not in financial distress. The bankruptcy case was dismissed in July 2024, with the judge finding it had been filed in bad faith to avoid the lawsuits against the site. The defamation case was set to go to trial in March 2025. In October 2024, the parties reached a settlement; the terms were not disclosed, but the Associated Press reported that nearly 70 articles were no longer available on the Gateway Pundit website after they had been included in the lawsuit as being defamatory.

In October 2024, the following "Note from the Editor: Legal Update" was posted to the site:

Georgia officials concluded that there was no widespread voter fraud by election workers who counted ballots at the State Farm Arena in November 2020. The results of this investigation indicate that Ruby Freeman and Wandrea 'Shaye' Moss did not engage in ballot fraud or criminal misconduct while working at State Farm Arena on election night. A legal matter with this news organization and the two election workers has been resolved to the mutual satisfaction of the parties through a fair and reasonable settlement.

=== COVID-19 misinformation ===
A 2020 study by researchers from Northeastern, Harvard, Northwestern and Rutgers universities found that among Republicans and older people The Gateway Pundit was the most shared fake news domain in tweets related to COVID-19, significantly outperforming other fake news domains such as InfoWars, WorldNetDaily, Judicial Watch and Natural News. The study also found that The Gateway Pundit was the 4th and 6th most shared domain overall, in August and September 2020 respectively.

In February 2021, a Gateway Pundit article claimed without evidence that the Centers for Disease Control and Prevention (CDC) had "illegally inflated the COVID fatality number by at least 1,600 percent". The fact-checker Health Feedback noted that evidence indicated that the deaths due to COVID-19 were being undercounted.

In August 2021, the British anti-disinformation organization Logically found that 30% of referral traffic to OpenVAERS, a website which promotes misinformation about COVID-19 vaccines, came from The Gateway Pundit.

=== Other ===
The Gateway Pundit has promoted the false claim that Barack Obama was not born in the United States. On March 9, 2017, almost 50 days after Obama left office, a Gateway Pundit article highlighted a tweet by Obama's half-brother Malik Obama with an image of a Kenyan birth certificate with Barack Obama's name. The image had been circulating since 2009 when it was originally posted by Orly Taitz, but its authenticity has been debunked. According to Kenyan journalist Salim Lone, then-spokesman for Kenyan Prime Minister Raila Odinga, "It's a forgery. Kenya only became a Republic in December, 1964. Other arguments could also be marshaled, but they are not needed."

In December 2017, The Gateway Pundit published a Reddit post as evidence that Democratic activists were committing voter fraud in the 2017 Alabama Senate special election. The redditor behind the post later said that the post was intended "as an obvious troll". When asked by The Washington Post, the writer of the Gateway Pundit post declined to say whether he had contacted the redditor to verify the information; later the Gateway Pundit story contained an update at the bottom: "Liberals say these are fake Reddit posts(?) Regardless, the posts are still up on Reddit and the posters are still encouraging Democrats to cheat." Also in December 2017, The Gateway Pundit published a story falsely saying that Facebook had taken down a previous Gateway Pundit story about the Alabama election, when in fact a Facebook algorithm had made it less prevalent after it had been flagged as fake news.

In April 2018, The Gateway Pundit falsely claimed in a headline that two prominent African-American conservative video bloggers – Diamond and Silk – had been censored by Facebook.

In July 2018, The Gateway Pundit falsely claimed that then-senator Kamala Harris had lied about her school's integration history. The article was cited by radio host Larry Elder and others in June 2019 after Harris confronted then-presidential candidate Joe Biden over his opposition to busing during the first Democratic presidential debate.

In September 2018, after psychology professor Christine Blasey Ford alleged that U.S. Supreme Court nominee Brett Kavanaugh had sexually assaulted her in the 1980s when they were teenagers, The Gateway Pundit published an article erroneously claiming that Kavanaugh's mother, a district court judge in Maryland, had once ruled in a foreclosure case against Dr. Ford's parents, creating what The Gateway Pundit called "bad blood" between the two families. In an update, The Gateway Pundit noted, "CBS News reports the case was settled amicably and the Blaseys kept their house."

On October 30, 2018, NBC News and The Atlantic published articles detailing a scheme to falsely accuse Robert Mueller of sexual misconduct in 1974. The articles reported involvement by Jack Burkman and Jacob Wohl, the latter a writer for The Gateway Pundit. Hours after these reports, The Gateway Pundit published on its site "exclusive documents" about a "very credible witness" to support the accusations against Mueller. Each document had in its header the phrase "International Private Intelligence", the business slogan of Surefire Intelligence, a firm created by Wohl. The site removed the documents later that day, stating they were investigating the matter, as well as "serious allegations against Jacob Wohl". The following day, Hoft retweeted Wohl's comment suggesting Mueller's office was actually behind the scheme. Mueller's office had days earlier referred the scheme to the FBI. Burkman and Wohl convened a press conference outside Washington on November 1, ostensibly to present a woman who they said signed an affidavit, which Gateway Pundit had published, accusing Mueller of raping her in a New York hotel room in 2010 – on a date he was contemporaneously reported by The Washington Post to be serving jury duty in Washington. The men accused Mueller's office of "leaking" the eight year-old Post story to discredit their allegations. The purported accuser, a Carolyne Cass, did not appear at the press conference, with the men asserting she had panicked in fear of her life and taken a flight to another location. Soon after the press conference, Hoft announced that The Gateway Pundit had "suspended [their] relationship" with Wohl.

== Staff ==
=== Jim Hoft ===
In March 2013, Hoft, The Gateway Pundit's founder, was awarded the Reed Irvine Award for New Media by the Accuracy in Media watchdog at the Conservative Political Action Conference (CPAC).

In August 2013, Hoft contracted a serious strep infection, lost his vision in one eye, suffered five strokes, and required 12 hours of open-heart surgery. Three months after his treatment and before the imminent loss of his health insurance, Hoft stated that it was the Affordable Care Act that had caused insurance companies to leave the marketplace in his home state of Missouri.

Following the 2016 mass shooting at the gay nightclub in Orlando, Florida, Hoft came out as gay, blamed Barack Obama for the massacre and derided "leftwing gay activists" Sally Kohn and Perez Hilton for blaming the National Rifle Association and Christianity for the attack. In 2019, Hoft announced his engagement to a Filipino man, Jezreel Morano, who he had met while on holiday in 2016. Morano had moved from the Philippines to the United States, where the two could be legally wed, in 2017.

On March 4, 2017, Hoft spoke at the Spirit of America Rally in Nashville, Tennessee, and announced that he was starting an event, "The Real News Correspondents' Dinner", to compete with the White House Correspondents' Dinner. The event occurred as planned on April 28, 2017.

In February 2018, Hoft was scheduled to participate in a Conservative Political Action Conference panel titled "Social Media Censorship". After CPAC preemptively removed him from the discussion on censorship following Hoft's coverage of the recent Florida mass shooting, he said that CPAC was in effect engaging in its own form of censorship.

=== Notable writers ===
Notable writers for The Gateway Pundit, past and present, include Michael Strickland (2015–2016), Lucian Wintrich (2017–2018), Cassandra Fairbanks (2017–present), and Jacob Wohl (2018).

== See also ==
- List of fake news websites
- Fake news websites in the United States
