= J. Bart Classen =

American immunologist and anti-vaccinationist

John Barthelow Classen
- Education: University of Maryland, Baltimore; Columbia University
- Occupations: Immunologist, anti-vaccination activist
- Years active: 1997–present
- Known for: Promoting unverified links between vaccines and diabetes, COVID-19 mRNA vaccine-prion claims
- Medical career
- Field: Immunology
- Sub-specialties: Type 1 diabetes research (disputed)
- Notable works: COVID-19 RNA Based Vaccines and the Risk of Prion Disease (2021)

John Barthelow Classen is an American immunologist and opponent of vaccination. He received his M.D. from the University of Maryland, Baltimore in 1988, his M.B.A. from Columbia University in 1992 and obtained his medical license in October 1997. He is best known for publishing research concluding that vaccines, in particular the Hib vaccine, cause insulin-dependent diabetes mellitus, a hypothesis he proposed based on experiments he conducted on mice in 1996. His views are disputed and considered unverified.

A widely reposted 2021 Facebook post claiming that the mRNA vaccines against COVID-19 could cause prion diseases was based on a paper by Classen. The paper was published in Microbiology and Infectious Diseases, whose publisher, Scivision Publishers, is included in Beall's list of publishers of predatory journals. Vincent Racaniello, professor of microbiology and immunology at Columbia University, described the claim as "completely wrong". Tulane University virologist Robert Garry stated that Classen has offered no evidence for the three pillars of his argument: that the sequence overlaps between the Pfizer vaccine are greater than occur with any randomly-selected stretch of RNA, or that the vaccine could cause zinc to be released and that doing so would affect its purported targets as he proposes.

== Anti-vaccination views ==
Classen proposes that vaccines cause diabetes by causing the release of interferons, causing an autoimmune state leading to immune-mediated type 1 diabetes, and he is quoted on many anti-vaccine websites, such as that of the National Vaccine Information Center. His work has been criticized, for example, journalist Amy Wallace wrote that the vaccine-diabetes link "...relies on the flawed work of one doctor [Classen], who gathered data on a slew of vaccines and failed to follow standard study protocols. No other study — including those using the same data — could reproduce the results." Independent studies that have investigated the potential link between vaccines and diabetes include one, published by Frank DeStefano, which "did not find an increased risk of type 1 diabetes associated with any of the routinely recommended childhood vaccines." DeStefano et al. also noted that another study of over 100,000 children examined the potential connection between Hib vaccines and diabetes and found no association between the two. Similarly, the Australian National Centre for Immunisation Research and Surveillance examined Classen's studies and wrote that "Other researchers who have studied the issue have not verified Dr Classen’s findings."

The American Council on Science and Health has said the following of Classen's claims of a link between vaccines, autism, and immune-related diseases:

"These assertions have absolutely no basis in scientific fact. The link between vaccines and autism has been debunked multiple times since it was first proposed by Wakefield, and the bottom line is that there was never any link between vaccines and autism. We urge the public to stop listening to the ideas promoted by the anti-vaccine movement and do what is best for public health, which is to get vaccinated."

In a review article from Trends in Internal Medicine, which is also connected to Scivision Publishers, Classen promoted the idea that COVID-19 vaccines were bioweapons created by the Mossad, which he claims have infiltrated the NIAID, who are working on depopulation and the New World Order.

== Patents ==
Classen holds a number of patents, specifically regarding "the act of reading the published scientific literature and using it to create vaccination schedules that minimize immune disorders," and has sued four biotechnology companies over allegedly infringing on them. While a district court had found that Classen's idea was too abstract to be patented, an appeals court found otherwise following an appeal by Classen.
