= Animal magnetism (disambiguation) =

Animal magnetism is a pseudoscientific theory promoted by Franz Mesmer in the 18th century that posits the existence of an invisible natural force possessed by all living things and that can have physical effects.

Animal magnetism or Animal Magnetism may also refer to:

== Science ==
- Biomagnetism, the phenomenon of magnetic fields produced by living organisms
- Human magnetism, the supposed ability of some humans to attract various objects to their skin
- Magnetoreception, a sense which allows an organism to detect the Earth's magnetic field

== Arts and entertainment ==
- Animal Magnetism (Merzbow album), 2003
- Animal Magnetism (Scorpions album), 1980
- Animal Magnetism (play), a 1788 play by Elizabeth Inchbald
- Animal Magnetism, a novel series by Jill Shalvis
- "Animal Magnetism", an episode of the television series They Came from Outer Space

== Other uses ==
- Charisma, a personal quality of magnetic charm, persuasion, or appeal
- Sexual attractiveness, an individual's ability to attract other people sexually
