= Laidler =

The surname Laidler is a surname. Notable people with the surname include:

- David Laidler (born 1938), English/Canadian economist and scholar of monetarism
- Graham Laidler (1908–1940), British cartoonist
- Harry W. Laidler (1884–1970), American Socialist writer and politician
- Jeremy Laidler (born 1989), Australian rules football player
- Jim Laidler, American autism activist and skeptic
- Keith J. Laidler (1916–2003), English pioneer in chemical kinetics
