= Michael Yeadon =

British researcher and conspiracy theorist

Michael Yeadon is a British anti-vaccine activist and retired pharmacologist who attracted media attention in 2020 and 2021 for making false or unfounded claims about the COVID-19 pandemic and the safety of COVID-19 vaccines. The Times has described him as "a hero of Covid conspiracy theorists" and "a key figure in the antivax movement". Until 2011, he served as the chief scientist and vice-president of the allergy and respiratory research division of the drug company Pfizer, and is the co-founder and former CEO of the biotechnology company Ziarco.

== Career ==
Yeadon received his PhD under Ian Kitchen at the University of Surrey in Guildford, UK. His thesis was on the respiratory system of rats. Yeadon worked with Salvador Moncada at the Wellcome Research Laboratories, focusing on airway hyper-responsiveness and the effects of pollutants such as ozone and nitrogen oxide, as well as working on drug discovery of 5-LO and COX.

He served as vice-president of Pfizer's allergy and respiratory research unit in Sandwich, Kent, where he oversaw the development of drugs for asthma and chronic obstructive pulmonary disease (COPD). During his work at Pfizer, Yeadon was responsible for the selection of targets and the progression of new molecules into human trials. His unit developed inhaled and oral NCEs that showed positive results in clinical trials for asthma, allergic rhinitis and COPD.

Pfizer closed its Kent research facility in 2011. Yeadon, who had not worked with vaccines, then left Pfizer and with three colleagues founded the biotechnology company Ziarco, for which he served as CEO and which was sold to Novartis for $325 million in 2017.

== COVID-19 misinformation ==
Yeadon falsely claimed in an October 2020 blog post that the COVID-19 pandemic in the United Kingdom was "effectively over". (Note: In a November 2020 interview with talk show host Julia Hartley-Brewer, Yeadon falsely stated that the pandemic was "fundamentally over in the UK".) He stated that there would be no "second wave" of infections and that healthy people could not spread the SARS-CoV-2 virus. Yeadon has also discouraged COVID-19 lockdowns and the use of face masks despite evidence for their effectiveness. Several of Yeadon's false or misleading claims have been amplified on social media.

Yeadon has claimed without evidence that COVID-19 vaccines were unnecessary, unsafe, and could cause infertility in women. In a letter to the European Medicines Agency, Yeadon and the German physician Wolfgang Wodarg called for all vaccine trials to be stopped, falsely suggesting that mRNA vaccines could target the syncytin-1 protein needed for placenta formation. (Note: Wodarg and Yeadon wrote, "There is no indication whether antibodies against spike proteins of SARS viruses would also act like anti-Syncytin-1 antibodies. However, if this were to be the case, this would then prevent the formation of a placenta which would result in vaccinated women essentially becoming infertile." Multiple fact-checkers have debunked the latter claim.) A Telegram account under his name has promoted the unfounded claim that the vaccines cause recipients to become magnetized.

Yeadon has been interviewed by The Exposé, a website known for publishing COVID-19 misinformation. In an interview with American political strategist Steve Bannon, Yeadon falsely asserted that children were "50 times more likely to be killed by the COVID vaccines than the virus itself", citing a high number of events following COVID-19 vaccination reported on the Vaccine Adverse Event Reporting System (VAERS) database. The US Centers for Disease Control, which operates the database, cautions that such reports are not verified and do not prove that vaccines caused any given adverse event.

== Political activism ==
Yeadon founded the Liberal Spring movement in the UK, with the goal of turning the Liberal Democrats into a movement for "Covid-sceptic beliefs", according to The Times. He has contributed funding to Liberty Places, a group promising to build a community on the African archipelago of Zanzibar for Europeans to escape COVID-19 lockdowns and vaccine mandates. Interviewed on Bannon's War Room podcast, Yeadon indicated he would also be providing support for "U.S. politicians and influencers".

== Publications ==
- Yeadon, Michael; Diamant, Zuzana (2000). New and exploratory therapeutic agents for asthma. New York: Marcel Dekker. ISBN 0-585-25139-8. OCLC 45730917.
