= OpenVAERS =

American anti-vaccine website

- Website type: Anti-vaccine
- Founded: January 2021
- Founder: Liz Willner
- Website: openvaers.com

OpenVAERS is an American anti-vaccine website created in 2021 by Liz Willner. The website misrepresents data from the Vaccine Adverse Event Reporting System (VAERS) to promote misinformation about COVID-19 vaccines.

== History ==
Lizabeth Pearl "Liz" Willner has worked as a freelance web designer. Willner resides in Oakland, California.

In April 2019, Willner began posting anti-vaccine content after reporting that her child suffered an injury after receiving a vaccine. Willner initially focused her efforts on opposing Senate Bill 276 in California, a piece of legislation introduced to tighten vaccination exemption rules for children.

In September 2019, Willner started OpenVAERS as a project of the website The Arktivist. When the COVID-19 pandemic began in 2020, Willner began investing time in the OpenVAERS project, and opposed lockdown measures imposed in California. In January 2021, Willner launched OpenVAERS as a standalone website.

== Influence ==
In August 2021, the British anti-disinformation organization Logically reported that 30% of the website's referral traffic came from The Gateway Pundit, a far-right fake news website, and over 10% came from English conspiracy theorist Vernon Coleman. Logically also found that almost 3% of the referral traffic for the official VAERS database came from OpenVAERS. According to Logically, the website has attracted 1.23 million visitors since its launch.

== COVID-19 vaccine misinformation ==
OpenVAERS misrepresents data from the VAERS database to indicate that the COVID-19 vaccines are harmful by publishing unverified data and statistics on the number of people who have allegedly died or suffered injuries after being vaccinated against COVID-19. The website is designed to present the information in an easily accessible format, which allows decontextualized screenshots to be shared on social media platforms such as Twitter, Facebook and TikTok. Logically noted that the website did not include the VAERS disclaimer for how its data should be interpreted until it was added on August 12, 2021.

Kolina Koltai, a Postdoctoral Fellow of the Center for an Informed Public (ICP) at the University of Washington, described OpenVAERS as "misinformation 101", adding: "It's decontextualization. I literally show examples like that in classes that I teach. You take a bit of information and you remove all the other context from it. That's common with almost any misinformation you can see." Logically analyst Nick Backovic said, "By design, it's there for virality because it's so easy to share these screenshots, out of context, and people won't question it. It looks official, sounds official, because it also has this very similar name to the actual government website."
