= The Exposé =

British conspiracist website

- Home page in October 2022
- Website type: Conspiracy theory
- Available in: English
- Country of origin: United Kingdom
- Owner: Jonathan Allen-Walker
- Creator: Jonathan Allen-Walker
- Website: expose-news.com
- Launched: November 2020; 5 years ago

The Exposé (formerly known as The Daily Exposé) is a British conspiracist and fake news website created in 2020 by Jonathan Allen-Walker. It is known for publishing COVID-19 and anti-vaccine misinformation.

The website became known internationally after Brazilian president Jair Bolsonaro cited one of its articles in a speech falsely claiming that COVID-19 vaccines could cause AIDS, and after Chinese state media outlets republished one of its articles which falsely claimed that COVID-19 was created by Moderna.

== History ==
The Exposé was created in November 2020 by Jonathan Allen-Walker, a welder from Scunthorpe in Lincolnshire. In March 2021, Twitter suspended the site's main account, but it created several alt accounts to evade its ban. Following its second ban, the site relied on pairs of alt accounts to avoid losing all of its followers or the ability to tweet, and accused Twitter of censorship. As of July 2021, two of the site's alt accounts had approximately 14,000 and 18,000 followers respectively, with 65% of the site's referrals coming from Twitter. As of March 2023, the site's main account had approximately 5,600 followers.

== Content ==
Ernie Piper of Logically, a British anti-disinformation research organisation, said that The Exposé "was unique both for producing a high volume of original content" and for "[trying] to make it look like they were doing hard-hitting investigative journalism" instead of "twisting the facts to suit conspiracy theories." Piper wrote in July 2021 that the website "has promoted a standard portfolio of COVID-denialist, anti-vaxxer, and Great Reset myths framed as breaking news" since its establishment, noting that the site's writers "often distort or misinterpret the information within the snapshots of the documents they use to push a number of conspiratorial narratives". The website has interviewed fringe figures such as anti-vaccine activist Michael Yeadon.

=== COVID-19 misinformation ===
The Exposé has falsely linked the COVID-19 vaccines to AIDS, miscarriages, monkeypox and hepatitis. The website has also downplayed the number of deaths due to COVID-19 in the United Kingdom and falsely claimed that the vaccines are causing mass deaths.

In June 2021, The Exposé falsely claimed that Public Health England (PHE) data proved that more vaccinated people were dying due to COVID-19 than unvaccinated people. The website's claim was debunked by the BBC, Full Fact and Reuters. The claim was later cited in a Sky News Australia broadcast by host Alan Jones and politician Craig Kelly; Sky News Australia subsequently removed the broadcast and issued a correction on its website.

In October 2021, The Exposé used data published by the UK Health Security Agency (UKHSA), which misleadingly indicated that COVID-19 infection rates were higher among fully-vaccinated than unvaccinated people, to falsely claim in several articles that the vaccines were not only ineffective but were also causing vaccinated people to develop AIDS "much faster than anticipated". The articles were widely shared on social media across the world, and one such article was cited by Before It's News, a fake news website, which was subsequently used as a source by Brazilian president Jair Bolsonaro in a speech. The video of Bolsonaro's speech was removed from Facebook, Instagram and YouTube for violating their policies regarding COVID-19 vaccines.

In March 2022, The Exposé falsely claimed that a study proved "beyond a reasonable doubt" that COVID-19 had been created by Moderna. The study, which was published in the Frontiers in Virology research journal, said that Moderna had patented a 19 nucleotide genetic sequence uniquely matching a part of the SARS-CoV-2 spike protein three years prior to the pandemic, arguing it was evidence that the virus was manufactured as part of a lab leak conspiracy. The study has been widely derided for its misunderstanding of statistical likelihood, particularly as the 19 nucleotide sequence is not unique to SARS-CoV-2, and is also found in organisms like bacteria and birds. The Exposé's article was republished by Chinese state media outlets, including China Daily and Global Times, and was shared on Twitter by a counselor for the Chinese Ministry of Foreign Affairs' Department of Information.

In July 2022, The Exposé posted a graph indicating that 94% of deaths due to COVID-19 in England between April 1 and May 31 were among those who were vaccinated. The graph was widely shared on social media. Reuters and Lead Stories found that the statistic by itself was misleading as it failed to acknowledge the country's vaccination rate.

In September 2022, The Exposé falsely claimed that the COVID-19 vaccines contain graphene oxide.

== Operation ==
Ernie Piper of Logically wrote in July 2021 that the website's finances and number of contributors, and whether it had permanent staff besides Allen-Walker, were "unclear". The website has run monthly fundraising campaigns since February 2021 on its home page, Twitter and Telegram, with sporadic campaigns on other platforms such as Buy Me a Coffee and GoFundMe.

== See also ==
- List of fake news websites
