= DeStefano =

DeStefano is an Italian surname with Greek origin. Notable people with the surname include:

- Anthony DeStefano (born 1965), American author
- Chris DeStefano, American singer
- Dusty DeStefano (1917–1982), American basketball and baseball coach
- Frank DeStefano, medical researcher
- Fred DeStefano (1900–1974), American football player
- Joe DeStefano (born 1960), politician
- John M. DeStefano (died 2008), American artist
- John DeStefano Jr. (born 1955), American mayor
- Johnny DeStefano (born 1979), American political advisor
- Lauren DeStefano (born 1984), American author
- Mario Anthony DeStefano (1915–1975), American gangster
- Mike DeStefano (born 1966), American comedian
- Robert DeStefano (born 1962), American chiropractor
- Sam DeStefano (1909-1973), American mobster
- Stephen DeStefano (born 1966), American comics artist

== See also ==
- Ricci v. DeStefano
