= Magneto (disambiguation) =

A magneto is a permanent magnet electrical generator.

Magneto may also refer to:

== Fictional characters ==
- Magneto (Marvel Comics), a comic book character in the Marvel Comics Universe
  - Magneto (film character), the X-Men film series adaptation
- Magneto (Amalgam Comics), based in part on the character Magneto from Marvel Comics
- Magneto (Atlas Comics), a different comic book character, created by Stan Lee before Atlas became Marvel
- Captain Lance Magneto, title character of the shareware adventure game Cap'n Magneto

== Music ==
- Magneto (band), a Mexican boy band of the 1980s and 1990s
- "Magneto" (song), the debut single of the British group Brigade
- "Magneto", a track on Skeleton Tree, by Nick Cave and the Bad Seeds
- "Magneto", a song on Solid Pleasure, the first Yello album

== Other uses ==
- Operation Magneto, a 1985 South African military operation
- Magneto, codename for Microsoft Windows Mobile 5.0
- Portuguese name of Magnetum, an ancient town and former bishopric, now Meinedo in Portugal and a Latin Catholic titular see, now Lousada
- Ignition magneto, self-contained ignition system for internal combustion engines

== See also ==
- Magento, an e-commerce software package
