= Denis Rancourt =

Canadian physics teacher

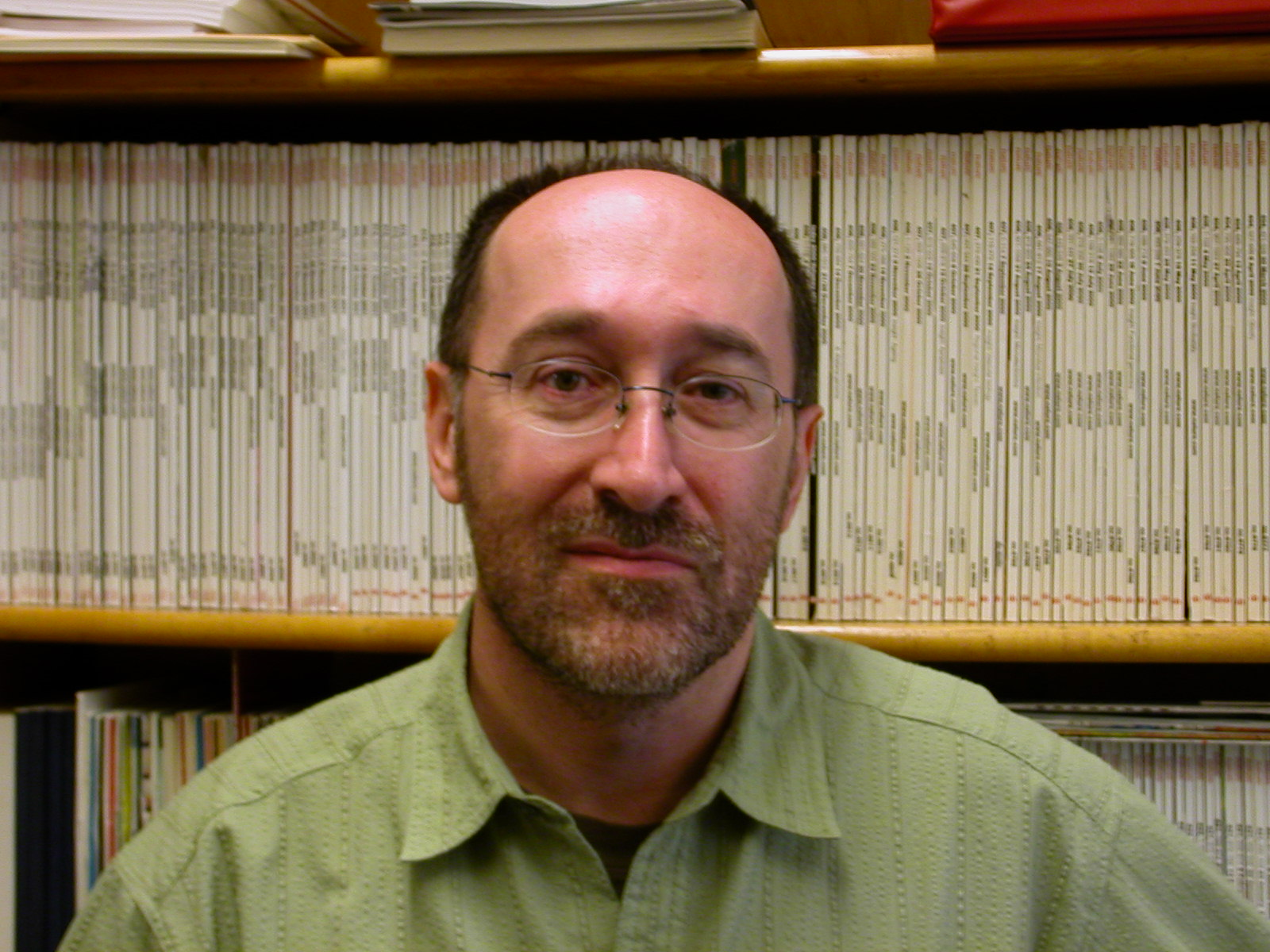
- Rancourt in his office at the University of Ottawa in 2004
- Born: March 23, 1957 (age 69); North Bay, Ontario
- Education: Bachelor's Degree from University of Ottawa (1980), Master's Degree from University of Toronto (1981), Ph.D from University of Toronto (1984)

Denis Rancourt is a former professor of physics at the University of Ottawa. Rancourt is widely known for his confrontations with his former employer, the University of Ottawa, over issues involving his grade inflation and "academic squatting", the act of arbitrarily changing the topic of a course without departmental permission.

== Early career ==
Rancourt obtained his bachelor's degree in 1980 and subsequently his master's degree in 1981 in physics from the University of Toronto. He later obtained a PhD from the University of Toronto also in physics in 1984. He subsequently held several postdoctoral positions before obtaining a permanent position at the University of Ottawa which he held for over 20 years, where he eventually obtained the rank of full professor.

== University conflict ==
His conflicts with the university started in 2005 when, in what was termed "academic squatting", he changed a course to focus "not just [on] how science impacts everyday life, but how it relates to greater power structures". In June 2008 a labour law arbitrator sided with Rancourt and ruled that "teaching science through social activism is protected by academic freedom". Rancourt was removed from all teaching duties in the fall of 2008 because the dean of the faculty of science did not agree with his granting A+ grades to 23 students in one course of the winter 2008 semester. In December, the Allan Rock administration of the University of Ottawa began dismissal proceedings against him and he was banned from campus. This generated a province-wide (Ontario) and national (Canada) public debate on grading in university courses. The university's Executive Committee of the Board of Governors voted unanimously to fire Rancourt on March 31, 2009. Rancourt grieved the dismissal and the Canadian Association of University Teachers ran an Independent Committee of Inquiry into the matter. The dismissal case went to binding arbitration where Rancourt's union took the position that the grading issue was a pretext to remove Rancourt and that the termination was done in bad faith. Arbitrator Claude Foisy ruled in a decision dated January 27, 2014, to uphold the university's dismissal of Rancourt. On March 10, 2014, Rancourt's union announced that it would appeal the Arbitrator's award. As a result, an independent inquiry was held, which, in December 2017, ruled that the termination was justified.

=== Independent Committee of Inquiry ===
In November 2008, the Canadian Association of University Teachers announced that it would establish an Independent Committee of Inquiry (ICOI) with terms of reference to: 1) "examine the series of ongoing disputes between Rancourt and the University of Ottawa"; 2) "to determine whether there were breaches or threats to academic freedom and other faculty rights"; and 3) "to make any appropriate recommendations". The Committee consists of three professors from York University, Wilfrid Laurier University, and Rider University. The report was released in 2017 and concluded that "the University of Ottawa was justified in terminating Dr. Rancourt for insubordination".

== Defamation case ==
While at Ottawa Rancourt started a blog, U of O Watch, to report various alleged malfeasance of administrators and of his colleagues. The University used "copyright infringement" against the blog for using University web site images and disciplined Rancourt with a suspension that was grieved by Rancourt.

In June 2011 University of Ottawa law professor Joanne St. Lewis sued Rancourt for $1 million over two U of O Watch blog posts about her, including one which called her a "house negro". The Law Times (Canada) did a feature about the case on August 29, 2011.

The action went to trial in May 2014, but Rancourt walked out of the trial in the first week citing "reasonable apprehension of bias" and a "kangaroo court", because the judge had struck out one of his defenses during his opening statement to the jury. In June 2014, the court found Rancourt had libeled St. Lewis, and awarded $350,000 in damages, plus court costs. Rancourt appealed the decision, but his appeal was denied and he was ordered to pay St. Lewis $30,000 in costs for the appeal.

== Other views ==
In 2007, Rancourt published an essay disputing the scientific consensus on climate change on his blog, which has served as a platform for climate denial by politicians such as James Inhofe.

On 17 September 2023, a flawed analysis co-authored by Rancourt and published by the Correlation Research in the Public Interest organization claimed that all-cause mortality data didn’t indicate any benefit from COVID-19 vaccination in 17 examined countries, estimating that the COVID-19 vaccinations had killed around 17 million people instead. The report faultily correlates vaccine rollout with increases in mortality, ignoring the role of SARS-CoV-2. The authors also didn’t establish whether the people who died had been vaccinated, since their all-cause mortality data was population-level data, not individual-level data.

In 2024, Rancourt made statements expressing support for various fringe views regarding COVID-19, including suggesting that the virus did not exist.
