= Vaccine Adverse Event Reporting System =

U.S. public reporting system for vaccine safety

The Vaccine Adverse Event Reporting System (VAERS) is a United States program for vaccine safety, co-managed by the U.S. Centers for Disease Control and Prevention (CDC) and the Food and Drug Administration (FDA). VAERS is a postmarketing surveillance program, collecting information about adverse events (possible harmful side effects) that occur after administration of vaccines to ascertain whether the risk–benefit ratio is high enough to justify continued use of any particular vaccine.

VAERS, the Vaccine Safety Datalink, and the Clinical Immunization Safety Assessment (CISA) Network are tools by which the CDC and FDA monitor vaccine safety to fulfill their duty as regulatory agencies charged with protecting the public.

As it is based on submissions by the public, VAERS is susceptible to unverified reports, misattribution, underreporting, and inconsistent data quality. Raw, unverified data from VAERS has often been used by the anti-vaccine community to justify misinformation regarding the safety of vaccines; it is generally not possible to determine from VAERS data if a vaccine caused an adverse event, or how common the event might be.

== Origins ==
The program is an outgrowth of the 1986 National Childhood Vaccine Injury Act (NCVIA), which requires health care providers to report:

- Any event listed by the vaccine manufacturer as a contraindication to subsequent doses of the vaccine.
- Any event listed in the Reportable Events Table that occurs within the specified time period after vaccination. The data are stored electronically by the CDC in the Vaccine Safety Datalink (VSD).

VAERS was established in 1990 and is managed jointly by the FDA and the CDC. It is meant to act as a sort of "early warning system"—a way for physicians and researchers to identify possible unforeseen reactions or side effects of vaccination for further study.

== Operation ==
Higher-priority uses of the data include reports of death and other serious adverse events, recognizing and detecting adverse effects, and finding unexpected adverse events involving new vaccines. The VAERS data are also used to monitor known reactions to vaccines and for vaccine lot surveillance. Data mining techniques such as empirical Bayes methods can be used to improve the quality of data analysis. The system was used in 1999 to identify a rotavirus vaccine that had an increased risk of a bowel obstruction condition, and confirmatory research led to the vaccine's use being suspended.

== Use in research and litigation ==
Many medical researchers make use of VAERS to study the effects of vaccination. VAERS warns researchers using its database that the data should not be used in isolation to draw conclusions about cause and effect. Nonetheless, raw data from VAERS has been used in vaccine litigation to support the claim that vaccines cause autism.

Litigation related to vaccines and autism has led to an increase in VAERS reports filed by plaintiff's attorneys. A 2006 article in Pediatrics found that most VAERS reports related to thimerosal, and many related to autism, were filed in connection with litigation, leading the authors to caution that inappropriate reliance on VAERS data may be a source of bias. The study's lead author stated: "Lawyers are manipulating this system to show increases [in vaccine-related adverse events] that are based on litigation, not health research." Paul Offit, chief of infectious disease at Children's Hospital of Philadelphia, wrote:

Public health officials were disappointed to learn that reports of autism to VAERS weren't coming from parents, doctors, nurses, or nurse practitioners; they were coming from personal-injury lawyers ... For the lawyers, VAERS reports hadn't been a self-fulfilling prophecy; they'd been a self-generated prophecy.

== Limitations and abuse ==
Like other spontaneous reporting systems, VAERS has several limitations, including underreporting, unverified reports, inconsistent data quality, and inadequate data about the number of people vaccinated. Due to the program's open and accessible design and its allowance of unverified reports, incomplete VAERS data is often used in false claims regarding vaccine safety. The Centers for Disease Control and Prevention (CDC) has warned that raw data from VAERS is not enough to determine whether a vaccine can cause a particular adverse event.

For instance, noted anesthesiologist Jim Laidler once reported to VAERS that a vaccine had turned him into The Incredible Hulk. The report was accepted and entered into the database, but the dubious nature of the report prompted a VAERS representative to contact Laidler, who then gave his consent to delete it from the database.

During the COVID-19 pandemic, raw VAERS data has often been disseminated by anti-vaccine groups in order to justify inaccurate safety claims related to COVID-19 vaccines, including adverse reactions and alleged fatalities claimed to have been caused by vaccines. Websites such as Medalerts (published by the anti-vaccine group National Vaccine Information Center) and OpenVAERS (which published a tally of vaccine adverse events and fatalities allegedly linked to COVID-19 vaccines based on VAERS data), have been linked to this misinformation. Comparative studies of VAERS, which look at relative reporting rates, have found that the data does not support these claims.

== See also ==
- FDA Adverse Event Reporting System (FAERS)
- VigiBase (WHO)
- Yellow Card Scheme (UK reporting system)
