= Frank DeStefano =

Epidemiologist

Frank DeStefano FACPM is a medical epidemiologist and researcher, who served as the director of the Immunization Safety Office (ISO) at the Centers for Disease Control and Prevention (CDC) from 2009 to 2021.

== Education ==
Frank DeStefano graduated from Cortland (NY) High School in 1970. DeStefano graduated from Cornell University in 1974, receiving a Bachelor of Science degree, and the University of Pittsburgh School of Medicine, from which he received a medical degree in 1978. He received his MPH at Johns Hopkins University School of Hygiene and Public Health in 1984.

== Research ==
DeStefano is an author of a number of scientific studies concluding that vaccines, in particular thimerosal-containing ones, do not cause autism. In March 2013, for example, DeStefano was the lead author on a study in the Journal of Pediatrics, which concluded that exposure of children to particular ingredients in vaccines, namely proteins and polysaccharides, did not increase their risk of autism. In addition, DeStefano et al. concluded that children with autism had received the same number of antigens as children without. This study received widespread media attention.

As director of the ISO, his research focused primarily on alleged and real adverse reactions to vaccines, and how common these reactions were. As mentioned above, some of DeStefano's research pertained to the use of thiomersal in vaccines; for example, he co-authored a study in 2003 in Pediatrics which concluded that there was no consistent association between thimerosal-containing vaccines and neurodevelopmental disorders. In addition, he was the final author of a study on the alleged link between thimerosal and autism, authored by the Vaccine Safety Datalink team, published in the New England Journal of Medicine. This study concluded that "Our study does not support a causal association between early exposure to mercury from thimerosal-containing vaccines and immune globulins and deficits in neuropsychological functioning at the age of 7 to 10 years." Other topics he has published research on include Guillain–Barré syndrome, as well as the potential link between seizures and the whole-cell pertussis vaccine or MMR vaccine. More generally, with regard to the VSD, he published a study in 2001 summarizing the ability of the project to reveal potential risks associated with vaccination, especially intussusception, through conduction of a population-based cohort study.

Originally, however, DeStefano's research focused on the safety of contraceptives, a topic he researched from 1982 to 1984 as a medical officer at the National Institutes of Health. Also in 1982, he joined the CDC as a senior epidemiologist in the Agent Orange projects.

== Career ==
After completing a residency in pediatrics at the University of Rochester School of Medicine, he joined the Epidemic Intelligence Service in 1979. In 1982, he completed a CDC residency in preventive medicine. In 2004, DeStefano was appointed acting chief of the Immunization Safety Branch of the National Immunization Program, now known as the National Center for Immunization and Respiratory Diseases. From 1992 to 1996, DeStefano held a post at the Marshfield Medical Research Foundation in Marshfield, Wisconsin. In 1996, he returned to the CDC. DeStefano served as director of the ISO from 2009 to 2021. He retired from the CDC in or around 2022.

== Selected publications ==
- Kramarz, Piotr; France, Eric (2001). "Population-based study of rotavirus vaccination and intussusception". Pediatric Infectious Disease Journal. 20 (4): 410–416. doi:10.1097/00006454-200104000-00008. PMID 11332666. S2CID 23664999.
- Bohlke, K.; Davis, R. L.; Marcy, S. M.; et al. (2003). "Risk of Anaphylaxis After Vaccination of Children and Adolescents". Pediatrics. 112 (4): 815–820. doi:10.1542/peds.112.4.815. PMID 14523172.
- Varricchio, F.; Iskander, J.; Destefano, F.; Ball, R.; Pless, R.; Braun, M. M.; Chen, R. T. (2004). "Understanding vaccine safety information from the Vaccine Adverse Event Reporting System". The Pediatric Infectious Disease Journal. 23 (4): 287–294. doi:10.1097/00006454-200404000-00002. PMID 15071280.
