= Jim Laidler =

American anesthesiologist and alternative medicine opponent

James R. Laidler
- Education: Pacific Lutheran University, University of Southern California, University of California San Francisco, University of Illinois at Chicago
- Known for: Opposition to autism therapies
- Scientific career
- Fields: Virology
- Workplaces: Portland State University

James R. Laidler is an American anesthesiologist in Portland, Oregon, who is known both for his activism for, and later his opposition to, alternative autism therapies.

== Education ==
Laidler obtained his bachelor's degree from Pacific Lutheran University in biochemistry in 1981 and his MD from the University of Southern California in 1985. He completed his residency in anesthesiology, as well as a fellowship in pain medicine, in Chicago and began treating autistic children in 2000. Laidler is an adjunct professor at Portland State University.

== Autism activism ==
Originally, Laidler was not only an outspoken advocate of alternative autism therapies, and often spoke at Defeat Autism Now! conferences, but had used many of them on his own sons, including chelation therapy, secretin, and a number of dietary supplements such as dimethylglycine. However, he had a change of heart after his son, who was on a gluten-free diet for his autism, ate a waffle at a buffet while his parents were distracted. Laidler says his son's doctors had told him that his son would experience a "total regression" were he to eat any gluten, but nothing actually happened. Another factor which motivated Laidler to change his mind was when his wife "secretly stopped the treatments and waited to see if he noticed a difference;" Laidler noticed no such difference and became convinced that such treatments are ineffective. Since then, Laidler has become an outspoken opponent of alternative treatments for autism, particularly chelation therapy; for example when a child died after receiving it in 2005, Laidler said he was confident that the therapy was responsible for the child's death, saying, "This is what I've been holding my breath hoping wouldn't happen." Laidler appeared in a 2007 episode of Nightline along with Mark Geier, where he contended, in contrast to Geier's views on the topic, that thimerosal-containing vaccines do not cause autism.

== Scientific work ==
In the scientific literature, Laidler has published papers not only in his capacity as a professor at Portland State specializing in virology, but has also published a paper in Pediatrics, arguing that data from the United States Department of Education are unreliable for measuring autism prevalence, a view he has reiterated on Quackwatch.

Laidler is also well known for submitting a report to the Vaccine Adverse Event Reporting System that a vaccine had turned him into the Incredible Hulk, which was then accepted and entered into the database; however it was later removed after Laidler was contacted by a VAERS representative and gave his permission to delete the record. Knowingly filing a false VAERS report is a violation of Federal law (18 U.S. Code § 1001) punishable by fine and imprisonment.
