= Natural News =

Conspiracy theory and fake news website

- Website type: Fake news website
- Available in: English
- Country of origin: United States
- Owner: Mike Adams
- Creator: Mike Adams
- Website: naturalnews.com
- Commercial: Nutraceuticals
- Launched: 2008; 18 years ago

Natural News (formerly NewsTarget, which is now a separate sister site) is a far-right website that promotes anti-vaccination content, conspiracy theories, fake news, and pseudoscience. The website began publishing articles in 2008 and is based in the United States. As of 2014, Natural News had approximately 7 million unique visitors per month.

The site's founder, Michael Allen "Mike" Adams, gained attention after posting a blog entry implying a call for violence against proponents of GMO foods, and then allegedly creating another website with a list of names of alleged supporters. He has been widely criticized and accused of using "pseudoscience to sell his lies". Adams has described vaccines as "medical child abuse".

The website sells various dietary supplements, promotes alternative medicine and climate change denial, makes tendentious nutrition and health claims, disseminates fake news, and espouses various conspiracy theories and pro-Donald Trump propaganda.

Natural News content has been restricted on various platforms including Google, YouTube, and Facebook. The website launched an AI chatbot called "Enoch" in 2025.

== Founder ==
Michael Allen "Mike" Adams (born 1967 in Lawrence, Kansas) is the founder and owner of Natural News; the domain name was registered in 2005 and began publishing articles in 2008.

According to Adams' own website, he became interested in alternative nutrition when he developed type II diabetes at the age of 30 and then "cured himself of diabetes in a matter of months and transformed himself into the picture of perfect health in mind, body and spirit". He recommends products for his readers to do the same.

He calls himself a holistic nutritionist, is enthusiastic about raw food, and claims that he excludes processed food, dairy, sugar, meat from mammals, and additives such as MSG from his diet. He also says he avoids use of prescription drugs and visits to Western medical doctors.

The Daily Beast found at least eight articles where Adams recommended products from Amazon Herb Company with some specifying to buy them from a distributor named Terry Pezzi. One such article is a lengthy review by Adams which he characterizes as "independent", despite Arizona non-profit business records showing that he had entered into business with Terry Pezzi prior to writing it.

== Conspiracy theories and controversial positions ==
Adams has endorsed conspiracy theories surrounding the Deepwater Horizon oil spill, and those involving Malaysia Airlines Flight 370. He has endorsed Burzynski: Cancer Is Serious Business, a movie about Stanislaw Burzynski, who treats cancer patients with unproven treatments that have received FDA warnings. Adams has also endorsed the books of conspiracy theorist Jim Marrs. Adams has made music videos expressing similar viewpoints as the articles posted on his website, such as opposition to the swine flu vaccine. He has described vaccines as "medical child abuse".

After Patrick Swayze died in 2009, Adams posted an article in which he remarked that Swayze, in dying, "joins many other celebrities who have been recently killed by pharmaceuticals or chemotherapy." Commentators of Adams' article on Swayze included bloggers David Gorski and Phil Plait, the latter of whom called Adams' commentary "obnoxious and loathsome."

In 2012, after the Sandy Hook Elementary School shooting occurred, Adams called for "medication control" instead of gun control. In March 2018, Adams created Hoggwatch.com, a website Snopes said was "apparently created solely for the purpose of attacking American gun control activist David Hogg."

In July 2014, Adams compared media outlets that wrote positively about GMOs with Nazi Germany's propagandists, calling them, "Monsanto collaborators who have signed on to accelerate heinous crimes being committed against humanity under the false promise of 'feeding the world' with toxic GMOs." He continued with a statement that he set in boldface: "that it is the moral right—and even the obligation—of human beings everywhere to actively plan and carry out the killing of those engaged in heinous crimes against humanity." A day after the post a website called "Monsanto Collaborator" appeared online which listed the names of scientists and journalists who allegedly collaborate with the bio industry; Adams denied creating the website claiming that Monsanto set up the website in order to frame him.

== Platform removals and restrictions ==
On February 22, 2017, Google delisted about 140,000 pages on Natural News, removing it from search results. It was returned soon after. The following year, on March 3, 2018, YouTube removed the Natural News channel for terms of service violations, effectively removing its library of videos from the site. The channel was subsequently reinstated and the videos returned.

In February 2019, The Atlantic reported that Natural News was one of the most prominent anti-vaccination websites on Facebook. In June 2019, Facebook removed the Natural News page from its website for violating its policies against spam. Adams wrote on InfoWars that his site was "permanently banned" from Facebook, and on The Gateway Pundit that the ban was part of a conspiracy against his website.

In May 2020, Facebook expanded the ban to include all Natural News content from its platform after discovering that the site was boosting its popularity using content farms in North Macedonia and the Philippines, a form of spamming. Natural News bypassed the ban by republishing its content on a large number of topic-specific domain names, including trump.news, extinction.news, mind.control.news, and veggie.news. The Institute for Strategic Dialogue found 496 domain names associated with Natural News as of June 2020.

Natural News has been blacklisted as a source on Wikipedia.

== Criticism ==
An article in the journal Vaccine said the site "tend(s) to not only spread irresponsible health information in general (e.g. discouraging chemotherapy or radiation for cancer treatment, antiretrovirals for HIV, and insulin for diabetes), but also have large sections with dubious information on vaccines."

According to John Banks, Adams uses "pseudoscience to sell his lies" and is "seen as generally a quack and a shill by science bloggers." Adams is also listed as a "promoter of questionable methods" by Quackwatch.

Steven Novella of NeuroLogica Blog characterizes Adams as "a dangerous conspiracy-mongering crank" and called Natural News "a crank alt med site that promotes every sort of medical nonsense imaginable." Novella continued: "If it is unscientific, antiscientific, conspiracy-mongering, or downright silly, Mike Adams appears to be all for it—whatever sells the "natural" products he hawks on his site."

Robert T. Carroll at The Skeptic's Dictionary said, "Natural News is not a very good source for information. If you don't trust me on this, go to Respectful Insolence or any of the other bloggers on ScienceBlogs and do a search for Natural News... Hundreds of entries will be found and not one of them will have a good word to say about [Adams] as a source."

Peter Bowditch of the website Ratbags has criticized the site, referring to it as a "cesspit" and in 2011 and 2015, Brian Dunning listed Natural News as #1 on his "Top 10 Worst Anti-Science Websites" lists. Other individuals who have commented about Adams' website include astronomer and blogger Phil Plait, PZ Myers, and Mark Hoofnagle.

In February 2014, Brian Palmer, writing in the Daily Herald of Arlington Heights, Illinois, criticized the site's promotion of alternative medicine treatments, such as bathing in Himalayan salt and eating Hijiki seaweed, and referred to the claims Natural News made about their efficacy as "preposterous." In August 2014, Nathanael Johnson, writing for Grist, dismissed Natural News as "simply not credible" and as "nothing but a conspiracy-theory site."

On December 8, 2016, Michael V. LeVine, writing in Business Insider, criticized the site as part of a scientific fake news epidemic: "Snake-oil salesmen have pushed false cures since the dawn of medicine, and now websites like Natural News flood social media with dangerous anti-pharmaceutical, anti-vaccination and anti-GMO pseudoscience that puts millions at risk of contracting preventable illnesses."

== Notable claims and content ==
Natural News has made chemophobic claims about the purported dangers of "chemtrails", fluoridated drinking water, heavy metals, anti-perspirants, laundry detergent, monosodium glutamate (MSG), aspartame, and vaccines. The site has also spread conspiracy theories about the Zika virus being caused by genetically modified mosquitoes and the purported adverse effects of genetically modified crops, foods, and farming practices.

In 2011, Adams posted a report on Natural News which stated that many blueberry food products did not contain real blueberries.

In 2013, Adams posted an article describing what he saw when he examined Chicken McNuggets under a microscope. He said in the article that the patterns he saw included "dark black hair-like structures" and a round algae-like object.

On August 11, 2014, Natural News published a blog post promoting a homeopathic treatment for Ebola, which was met with harsh criticism from several commentators, and was taken down later that day. In a statement on the article, Natural News said that the blogger who posted the article, Ken Oftedal, was "under review" and that they did not condone anyone interacting with Ebola. However, as of August 20, 2014, the site was still featuring an article written by Adams promoting the use of herbal medicines to treat Ebola. Natural News was among the pseudoscience platforms which promoted hoaxes about the 2014 Ebola epidemic, including claims that an infected woman was found in Atlanta and that Ebola was a bioweapon.

In 2019, Natural News falsely claimed that wind turbines contribute more to climate change than fossil fuels.

A 2020 study by researchers from Northeastern, Harvard, Northwestern and Rutgers universities found that Natural News was among the top 5 most shared fake news domains in tweets related to COVID-19, the others being The Gateway Pundit, InfoWars, WorldNetDaily and Judicial Watch.

Natural News launched an AI chatbot called "Enoch" in 2025 that, according to Mike Adams, utilizes "a billion pages of content on alternative media."
