= Liew Thow Lin =

Malaysian entertainer

Chinese name
- Traditional Chinese: 劉少林
- Simplified Chinese: 刘少林
- Hanyu Pinyin: Liú Shàolín
- Jyutping: Lau4 Siu3 Lam4
- Hokkien POJ: Lâu Siáu-lîm

Liew Thow Lin (31 March 1930 - 9 April 2013) (Chinese: 劉少林; pinyin: Liú Shàolín; Pe̍h-ōe-jī: Lâu Siáu-lîm) of Malaysia was known as the "Magnet Man", (Chinese: 磁人; Pe̍h-ōe-jī: Chû-lâng), "Magnetic Man" or "Mr. Magnet" because he had the ability to stick metal objects to his body.

Liew performed in many charity events showing his ability. He could cause metal objects, weighing up to 2 kilograms (4.4 lb) each, up to 36 kg total, to stick to his skin. He also pulled a car using this ability.

Liew's ability was not due to any source of magnetism. Scientists from Malaysia's University of Technology found no magnetic field in Lin's body, but did determine that his skin exhibits very high levels of friction, providing a "suction effect". The trait appears to be genetic, appearing in Lin's three grandchildren. Liew was featured on the second episode of the Discovery Channel's One Step Beyond.

== See also ==
- Human magnetism
