= Vaccine Safety Datalink =

Centers for Disease Control and Prevention database

The Vaccine Safety Datalink Project (VSD) was established in 1990 by the United States Centers for Disease Control and Prevention (CDC) to study the adverse effects of vaccines.

Four large health maintenance organizations, including Kaiser Permanente, were initially recruited to provide the CDC with medical data on vaccination histories, health outcomes, and subject characteristics. The VSD database contains data compiled from surveillance on more than seven million people in the United States, including about 500,000 children from birth through age six years (2% of the U.S. population in this age group).

The VSD data-sharing program is now being administered by the National Center for Health Statistics Research Data Center. The data sharing guidelines have been revised to include comments from interested groups as well as recommendations from the Institute of Medicine (IOM).

The Vaccine Adverse Event Reporting System (VAERS), the VSD, and the Clinical Immunization Safety Assessment (CISA) Network are tools by which the CDC and FDA measure vaccine safety to fulfill their duty as regulatory agencies charged with protecting the public. Data from the VSD Project have been used to address a number of vaccine safety concerns; examples include a study clarifying the risk of anaphylaxis after vaccine administration and several studies examining the rejected hypothesis of a link between thimerosal-containing vaccines and autism.

== Participating healthcare organizations ==
The following organizations are members of the project:

- Kaiser Permanente Washington, Seattle, Washington
- Harvard Pilgrim Health Care, Boston, Massachusetts
- HealthPartners Institute, Bloomington, Minnesota
- Kaiser Permanente Northwest, Portland, Oregon
- Kaiser Permanente Northern California, Oakland, California
- Kaiser Permanente Colorado, Denver, Colorado
- Denver Health Medical Center, Denver, Colorado
- Marshfield Clinic Research Institute, Marshfield, Wisconsin
- Kaiser Permanente Southern California, Los Angeles, California
- Kaiser Permanente Mid-Atlantic States (Rockville, MD)
- Acumen (Burlingame, CA)
- Indiana University (Indianapolis, IN)
- OCHIN (Portland, OR)
