= National Vaccine Information Center =

Anti-vaccine group

- Founded: 1982
- Founders: Barbara Loe Fisher, Jeff Schwartz, Kathi Williams
- Type: 501(c)(3)
- Purpose: Anti-vaccination advocacy
- Location: Vienna, Virginia, U.S.
- Funding: Joseph Mercola
- Website: www.nvic.org
- Formerly called: Dissatisfied Parents Together (DPT)

The National Vaccine Information Center (NVIC), founded under the name Dissatisfied Parents Together (DPT) in 1982, is an American 501(c)(3) organization that has been widely criticized as a leading source of fearmongering and misinformation about vaccines. While NVIC describes itself as the "oldest and largest consumer-led organization advocating for the institution of vaccine safety and informed consent protections", it promotes false and misleading information including the discredited claim that vaccines cause autism, and its campaigns portray vaccination as risky, encouraging people to consider "alternatives." In April 2020, the organization was identified as one of the greatest disseminators of COVID-19 misinformation on Facebook.

Despite its name, the National Vaccine Information Center bears no relation to the National Vaccine Advisory Committee, an advisory body of the United States Department of Health and Human Services.

Since 2003, the NVIC has maintained a website named Medalerts.org, which republishes the CDC's Vaccine Adverse Event Reporting System data without its appropriate methodological transparency and warnings. This has led to misleading attributions of deaths to the COVID-19 vaccines.

== History ==
The organization was co-founded in 1982 by Jeff Schwartz, Barbara Loe Fisher, and Kathi Williams under the name Dissatisfied Parents Together (DPT). Each of them had observed the health of one of their children deteriorate at some point after receiving a dose of the DPT vaccine and had watched a television broadcast of the film DPT: Vaccine Roulette, which drew an erroneous causal link between DPT vaccines and illnesses of some children who received them. In 1985, Fisher and Harris Coulter co-authored a book, DPT: A Shot in the Dark, which asserted an association between the whole cell pertussis (whooping cough) vaccine in the DPT shot and autism. The Centers for Disease Control and Prevention now recommend the newer acellular pertussis vaccines (DTaP and Tdap), and whole cell pertussis vaccines are no longer used in the US. because of adverse effects unrelated to autism.

In the early 1980s, the organization joined with the American Academy of Pediatrics to draft the original legislation for the National Childhood Vaccine Injury Act of 1986, which created a federal vaccine injury compensation program, mandated doctors to give parents vaccine benefit and risk information, and required the recording and reporting of vaccine injuries and deaths (see Vaccine Adverse Event Reporting System). The organization changed its name to the National Vaccine Information Center in the early 1990s.

Like other anti-vaccination groups, NVIC has been investing heavily into its social media presence in the 2010s. In addition to developing their own social media channels, the organization pushes anti-vaccination messages to online gatherings of young parents, anti-GMO activists and wellness enthusiasts. However, due the group's decision to stick to Facebook as their main social media channel, they experienced only a small growth of their social media base, while other anti-vaccination groups such as Children's Health Defense saw their impact increase considerably on systems such as Instagram during the COVID-19 pandemic. In April 2020, the organization was identified as one of the greatest disseminators of COVID-19 misinformation on Facebook.

== Funding ==
NVIC claims to be supported primarily by small donations. However, a 2019 Washington Post analysis found that between 2009 and 2018, 40% of its funding ($2.9 million) came from the anti-vaccination activist and supplements seller Joseph Mercola. The funds were provided through Mercola's Natural Health Research Foundation.

Barry Segal's Focus for Health foundation has also contributed to NVIC, with $400,000 having been donated between 2011 and 2017.

In 2020, the NVIC took and received a federal loan of US$136,070 through the Paycheck Protection Program, even though it had opposed federal vaccination campaigns and spread misinformation about vaccines. Because of the latter behavior, in early 2021 Facebook disallowed the group from purchasing advertising on its networks.

== COVID pandemic ==
On October 16–18, NVIC hosted the 2020 International Public Conference on Vaccination, which aimed to coordinate messaging between the main anti-vaccination groups in the context of the COVID-19 pandemic. The attendees included Robert F. Kennedy Jr.'s Children's Health Defense and Del Bigtree speaking for the Informed Consent Action Network, as well as Joseph Mercola, Andrew Wakefield and Sherri Tenpenny.

=== Medalerts.org ===
NVIC's Medalerts republication of Vaccine Adverse Event Reporting System data, done without CDC's detailed warning of the data limitations, had led to incorrect interpretations and misleading reports attributing deaths to COVID-19 vaccines. The original United States Department of Health and Human Services VAERS website is willfully cautious, containing extensive and important warnings such as "Reports of death to VAERS following vaccination do not necessarily mean the vaccine caused the death" and others. The website states :

"VAERS reports alone cannot be used to determine if a vaccine caused or contributed to an adverse event or illness. The reports may contain information that is incomplete, inaccurate, coincidental, or unverifiable. In large part, reports to VAERS are voluntary, which means they are subject to biases."

HHS's VAERS data replicated by Medalerts is known to be frequently misrepresented by anti-vaccines sources.

== Reception ==
The journalist Michael Specter described the NVIC as:

"... an organization that, based on its name, certainly sounds like a federal agency. Actually, it's just the opposite: the NVIC is the most powerful anti-vaccine organization in America, and its relationship with the U.S. government consists almost entirely of opposing federal efforts aimed at vaccinating children."

The NVIC falsely asserts that there has been inadequate research into the link between the rise in the number of children diagnosed with autism and mass vaccination programs. There have been a number of peer-reviewed studies and meta-analyses that have shown no correlation between vaccine administration and autism diagnosis, and there is no biological plausibility for vaccines to cause autism, as autism is not an immune-mediated disease.

The skeptic and science blogger Phil Plait notes that while "On their site they take "vaccine injuries" as given," the "litany of effects is interesting, given that to the best of my knowledge (and I've looked) none of them has actually been linked to vaccines in real medical studies." The NVIC received criticism in April 2011 for ads that it placed on a jumbotron in Times Square. The ads criticized childhood immunization and promoted an alternative medicine website. In a letter to CBS, which owned the jumbotron, the American Academy of Pediatrics stated, "By providing advertising space to an organization like the NVIC... you are putting thousands of lives of children at risk."

A controversial ad produced by NVIC regarding preventive measures for influenza was aired on some Delta Air Lines flights, prompting the president of the American Academy of Pediatrics to write a letter to the CEO of Delta on November 4, 2011, urging Delta to "remove these harmful messages." An online petition was also set up to urge Delta to remove the ads.

The refusal of Delta Air Lines to stop showing the ad immediately prompted the Institute for Science in Medicine to protest and to call the decision:

"...indefensible from a public health perspective,..." and saying "The NVIC ad is, as one commentator aptly observed, a Trojan Horse. Delta passengers in November are being directed to the website of a prominent anti-vaccination organization, one that has tried to thwart national vaccine campaigns for three decades. Moreover, NVIC has the sort of name that sounds like a federal agency, one that passengers might mistake as a source of reliable information."

== See also ==
- List of vaccine topics
