= Logically (company) =

British fact-checking startup company

TheLogically Ltd
- Type: Private
- Industry: Fake news detection
- Founded: 2017
- Founder: Lyric Jain
- Headquarters: UK
- Number of locations: 5
- Key people: Baybars Örsek (vice president of fact-checking)
- Number of employees: 200 (2023)
- Website: logically.ai

Logically is a British multinational technology startup company that specializes in analyzing and fighting disinformation assisted by artificial intelligence (AI) software. Logically was founded in 2017 by Lyric Jain and is based in Brighouse, England, with offices in London, Mysore, Bangalore, and Virginia.

== History ==
Lyric Jain, who founded Logically in 2017, said he was partly inspired by his grandmother's turn to misinformation before she died of pancreatic cancer. A WhatsApp group that spread misinformation led her to replace "her cancer medication in favour of unproven, alternative treatments." He also witnessed the spread of misinformation in Britain around the time of the Brexit referendum.

An MIT grant helped launch the company. Logically first operated solely from Britain, employing 30 British residents by 2019. In early 2019, the company expanded to India, recruiting 40 employees who perform most of the company's fact-checking. In its 2019 seed round, Logically raised $7 million. In 2020, it raised another €2.77 million, including from the Northern Powerhouse Investment Fund and XTX Ventures. As of 2020, Logically had 100 employees.

In July 2020, the International Fact-Checking Network certified the company's Logically Facts unit as a fact-checker. The certification was renewed in September 2021 and January 2023.

In July 2022, Logically received $24 million in funding from the Alexa Fund, Amazon's venture capital unit. At that time, Logically had 175 employees in its US, UK and Indian branches. Jain said that while the company's main customers were the American, British and Indian governments, retail brands were also turning to it for help with protecting themselves from attacks by business rivals.

In June 2023, The Daily Telegraph reported that Logically was paid more than £1.2 million by the UK government to analyse disinformation terms online alongside its partnership with Facebook. Such topics included narratives pertaining to the COVID-19 pandemic, including anti-lockdown and anti-COVID-19 vaccine sentiment.

In August 2024, Logically acquired Insikt AI, an artificial intelligence company based in Barcelona. Insikt co-founders Jennifer Woodard and Guillem Garcia joined the Logically team, with Woodard currently serving as Vice President, Artificial Intelligence and Garcia as Head of Data Science.

In July 2025, Logically lost its contracts with TikTok and Meta Platforms. It was also reported that Logically had been sold to Kreatur Ltd as part of an administration process.

== Operation ==
Logically says it uses artificial intelligence to initially filter claims, saying that they use "AI to run claims through a database of previously checked facts, and assign a score of how likely that claim is to be accurate, based on past claims and the credibility of its source". After this matching process, human employees use their judgment to assess whether they believe claims to be true or false. Jain said in 2022, "There are clear limitations of going with a technology-only approach... and so we also retain the nuance and expertise that the [human] fact checkers are able to bring to the problem. It is essential in our view to have experts be central to our decision making."

In March 2021, Logically launched a service named Logically Intelligence (LI), which is aimed at helping governments and non-governmental organisations (NGOs) to identify and counter online misinformation. The service collects data from thousands of websites and social media platforms, then analyses it using an algorithm to identify potentially dangerous content and organise it into narrative groups. Jain said the company monitors how its clients use the platform and that any use that deviates from monitoring misinformation requires approval from the company's ethics board.

From August 2020 to June 2022, Logically offered a browser extension to help users check the credibility of online articles and fact-check claims.

== Investigations ==
Logically helped The Guardian disprove claims by an English pastor that 5G technology was connected to vaccination tracking. Logically is one of many companies hired by TikTok works to curtail disinformation being spread on the social network. The New Yorker noted its tracking of disinformation related to healthcare and the COVID-19 pandemic.

In August 2021, researchers at Logically identified the prominent QAnon influencer GhostEzra as Robert Smart, an evangelical Christian from Florida. GhostEzra was prominent for promoting antisemitic conspiracy theories and sharing the neo-Nazi propaganda film Europa: The Last Battle in QAnon communities.

In January 2022, Logically researchers published a report on Disclose.tv, a German disinformation outlet with a following that includes Holocaust deniers and neo-Nazis.

In February 2022, the BBC cited Logically's research in tracking the rise of pro-Russian accounts linking Ukraine to Nazi ideology following the 2022 Russian invasion of the country.

In August 2023, the company reported on a Chinese disinformation campaign related to the discharge of radioactive water at the Fukushima Daiichi Nuclear Power Plant. According to The New York Times, Chinese state media did not spread false information but did omit crucial details.
