= Human magnetism =

Claimed ability to attract objects to human skin

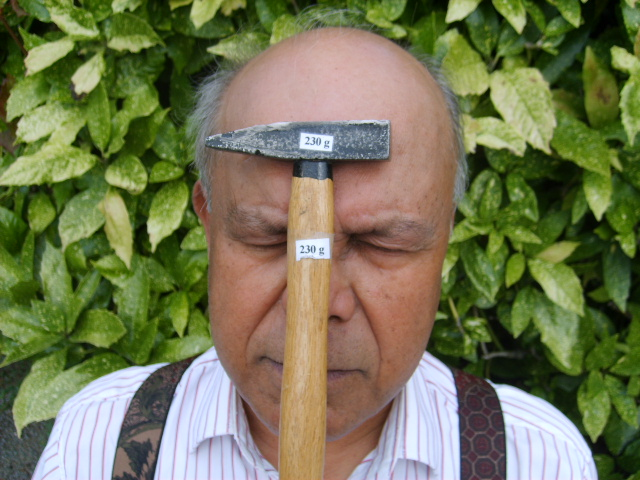
A man with a hammer stuck to his skin

Human magnetism is a popular name for the supposed ability of some humans to attract various objects to their skin. People alleged to have such an ability are often called human magnets. Although metal objects are the most prevalent material of attraction, some "human magnets" are also able to stick other types of materials to their skin, such as glass, porcelain, wood or plastic as well as metals with no ferromagnetic properties, such as brass and aluminium. However, none of the recorded claims of human magnetism corresponds with the physics of magnetism.

== Selected claimed human magnets ==
- Aurel Răileanu from Romania, also known as "Mr. Magnet"; is said to be the strongest human magnet
- Etibar Elchyev from Georgia, Guinness World Record holder for most spoons on a human body
- Ivan Stoiljkovic, a boy from Croatia
- Liew Thow Lin, known as Mr. Magnetic Man
- Dalibor Jablanović from Serbia, Guinness World Record holder for most spoons on a human face
- Arun Raikar from India, who could lift 10 kilograms (22 lb) of metal upon his body
- Agnė Kulitaitė from Lithuania is known to hold metal objects on her forehead or even cheeks.

== Explanations ==
Many of the people who can adhere objects to their body can do so not only with metal but also other materials. That would suggest that the phenomenon cannot be explained by magnetism and uses a different kind of physical effect. Skeptic Benjamin Radford has used a compass to check the magnetic field of a person that claimed to be a human magnet. He concluded that person did not produce magnetic fields. He also noted that those people usually have smooth and hairless skin and lean back slightly while sticking objects, which would not be necessary if they possessed magnetic powers. Many scientists and proponents of science, including James Randi, have explained this ability by friction and sticky skin; to prove that, Randi has demonstrated that human magnets lose their powers when they are covered in talc.

== See also ==
- Animal magnetism
- Biomagnetism
- Magnetoception
- Sherri Tenpenny, who falsely claimed the COVID-19 vaccine turns people into human magnets
