= Lauren Levine =

Film producer

Lauren Levine is a producer and writer. Levine is the co-head of Heartbones Entertainment with Colleen Hoover. Together they have co-produced and co-written adaptations of Hoover's novels Reminders of Him and Verity. Levine produced 2007's Bridge to Terabithia, which was nominated for a BAFTA.

== Career ==
=== MTV ===
Levine began her career as a production assistant at Channel 4 on Max Headroom. She moved from the UK to New York in 1992, where she continued to work as a producer and then as executive producer at MTV of shows like MTV Beach House, MTV US Top 20 Countdown, 120 Minutes, Headbanger's Ball, The Grind, Alternative Nation.

=== Movies and Series ===
In 2003, Levine optioned the book, I Am David. The film, I Am David, was written and directed by Paul Feig.

Levine joined Nickelodeon in the early aughts where she was executive producer on a variety of Nickelodeon productions such as (2007) The Last Day of Summer Bridge to Terabithia directed by Gabor Csupo, and Shredderman Rules, (2008) Gym Teacher directed by Paul Dinello, Merry Christmas, Drake & Josh, (2009) Spectacular! , (2010) The Boy Who Cried Werewolf, (2011) Best Player starring Jeannette McCurdy and Jerry Trainor and A Fairly Odd Movie: Grow Up, Timmy Turner, (2012) A Fairly Odd Christmas, Big Time Movie, and Rags, (2013) Swindle, starring Jeannette McCurdy, Ariana Grande, Noah Munck.

In 2017, Levine was a producer on Confess, a seven-episode series. Based on Colleen Hoover's 2015 novel Confess, it streamed on Verizon's go90.com, and starred Katie LeClerc, Sherilyn Fenn, Lucas Gage, and Ryan Cooper. It was the first scripted series out of Awestruck, a digital vertical from AwesomenessTV.

=== Heartbones Entertainment ===
In 2022, Levine and Colleen Hoover formed Heartbones Entertainment, with an intention to adapt Hoover's material to film in-house. Their first film, Reminders of Him, written by Hoover and Levine, was released in February 2026, and starred Maika Monroe, Tyriq Withers, Lauren Graham and Brad Whitford.

Levin is the executive producer of Verity, a book adaptation of the New York Times bestselling 2018 book. It stars Anne Hathaway, Josh Hartnett and Dakota Johnson, directed by Michael Showalter will be released in 2026.

== Filmography ==
YEAR	TITLE	CREDIT	NETWORK	NOTES
1984	MTV US Top 20 Countdown	Writer, Producer	MTV	Hosted by Daisy Fuentes, Adam Curry, John Norris
	Headbangers Ball	Executive Producer	MTV	Hosted by Riki Rathman, Adam Curry
1991	120 Minutes	Producer	MTV	Hosted by Dave Kendall
	The Grind	Executive Producer	MTV	Host by Eric Nies, Michelle Visage
	MTV Beach House	Executive Producer	MTV	Hosted by Carson Daly, Bill Bellamy
	Alternative Nation	Executive Producer	MTV	Hosted by Lisa Kennedy Montgomery, Toby Amies, Henry Rollins
	Lassie	Executive Producer		Cast includes Corey Sevier, Tim Post, Walter Massey
	Musicians	Executive Producer	MTV	Hosted by David Wild
2003	I Am David	Executive Producer	MTV	Written and directed by Paul Feig Cast includes Jim Caviezel
2007	The Last Day of Summer	Executive Producer	Nickelodeon	Cast includes Jansen Panettiere, Daniel Samonas, Jennette McCurdy
	Bridge to Terabithia	Executive Producer	Nickelodeon	Directed by Gabor Csupo Nominated for BAFTA Cast includes Josh Hutcherson, AnnaSophie Robb, Zooey Deschanel
	Shredderman Rules	Executive Producer	Nickelodeon	Cast includes Tim Meadows, Devon Werkheiser, Daniel Roebuck
2008	Gym Teacher	Executive Producer	Nickelodeon	Directed by Paul Dinello Cast includes Christopher Meloni, Avon Jogia, Nathan Kress, Amy Sedaris, Chris Kattan, Chelah Horsdal, David Allen Greir
	Merry Christmas, Drake & Josh	Executive Producer	Nickelodeon	Cast Includes Drake Bell, Josh Peck, Miranda Cosgrove, Yvette Nicole Brown, Bailee Madison, Jerry Trainor
2009	Spectacular!	Executive Producer	Nickelodeon	Cast includes Victoria Justice, Avon Jogia, Jesse Moss
2010	The Boy Who Cried Wolf	Executive Producer	Nickelodeon	Cast includes Victoria Justice, Brooke Shields, Chase Ellison
2011	Best Player	Executive Producer	Nickelodeon	Starring Jeannette McCurdy and Jerry Trainor
2012	A Fairly Odd Movie: Grow Up, Timmy Turner	Executive Producer	Nickelodeon	Cast includes Drake Bell
	Big Time Movie	Executive Producer	Nickelodeon	Cast includes Kendall Schmidt, James Maslow, Logan Henderson, Carlos PenaVega
	Rags	Executive Producer	Nickelodeon	Cast includes Keke Palmer, Avon Jogia, and Drake Bell
2013	Swindle	Executive Producer	Nickelodeon	Cast includes Jeannette McCurdy, Ariana Grande, Noah Munck
2017	Confess	Executive Producer	Verizon's go90.com & Awestruck	Seven episode series. Based on Colleen Hoover's 2015 novel Confess Cast includes Katie LeClerc, Sherilyn Fenn, Lucas Gage, and Ryan Cooper.
2026	Reminders of Him	Executive Producer and Co-Screenwriter	Heartbones Entertainment	Cast includes Maika Monroe, Tyriq Withers, Lauren Graham and Brad Whitford.
	Verity,	Executive Producer and Co-Screenwriter	Heartbones Entertainment	Cast includes Anne Hathaway, Josh Hartnett and Dakota Johnson, directed by Michael Showalter.
