= UpScrolled =

Social media app

- Developer: UpScrolled
- Release: June 2025
- Operating system: Android, iOS
- Type: Social media
- Website: upscrolled.com
- UpScrolled
- Users: 5 million (as of 7 April 2026)

UpScrolled is an Australian social media platform for microblogging and short-form online video sharing that was launched in June 2025 by Recursive Methods Pty Ltd. It was founded by Issam Hijazi.

== History ==
UpScrolled was launched in June 2025 by Recursive Methods Pty Ltd. It was founded by Issam Hijazi, a Palestinian-Australian app developer. UpScrolled is backed by the Tech for Palestine incubator.

In January 2026, UpScrolled saw increased attention and number of downloads after the acquisition of TikTok by a group of pro-Donald Trump US investors, including Larry Ellison, which led to calls to boycott TikTok and migrate to other apps. TikTok was alleged to be suppressing pro-Palestinian content, as well as news surrounding the killing of Alex Pretti in Minneapolis on the platform. UpScrolled subsequently climbed to the top 10 of Apple's App Store list of free apps.

The app saw a reported 2,850% increase in downloads between 22 and 24 January 2026. As of 27 January 2026, UpScrolled "had been downloaded about 400,000 times in the US and 700,000 globally since launching in June 2025". The app became the most downloaded app in the Apple App store on 29 January 2026, following allegations that TikTok was suppressing videos and content opposed to Immigration and Customs Enforcement (ICE) under its new ownership.

By 2 February 2026, UpScrolled had reached 2.5 million users. According to the Google Play Store and the Apple App Store, it has become the most downloaded social media app in the United States and Canada, with rising interest in the United Kingdom, France, Germany and Italy. On 14 February, UpScrolled was suspended from the Google Play Store; the suspension was reverted by 15 February.

== Founder ==
Hijazi was born in Jordan. His parents and grandparents are from Safad, a northern Israeli city near the Lebanese border. He worked for IBM and Oracle prior to starting UpScrolled.

Hijazi told Rest of World that he launched UpScrolled in response to Israel's genocide in Gaza which followed the October 7 attacks. He said, "I couldn't take it anymore. I lost family members in Gaza, and I didn't want to be complicit. So I was like, I'm done with this, I want to feel useful. I found this gap in the market, with a lot of people asking why there is no alternative to the Big Tech platforms for their content, which was getting censored." Hijazi also alleges that social media accounts that were posting pro-Palestinian content were getting shadow banned on larger platforms, and alleges that even his account was not exempt from being targeted by censors. Hijazi has further elaborated on the importance of social media independence to further the Palestinian cause.

In January 2026, Web Summit Qatar announced that Hijazi would be an opening night speaker. Following the announcement, there was a surge in ticket sales for the summit.

Hijazi lives in Sydney with his wife and daughter. He lost 60 family members during the Gaza war.

== Features ==
UpScrolled's algorithm allows users to discover posts based on likes, comments, and shares with time decay and some randomness, all chronologically, with "no manipulation" according to the app's website. UpScrolled has an interface resembling a mix of Instagram and Twitter, allowing users to post and view text posts, photos, and videos. It also lets users send private messages to each other. The app is currently available for iOS and Android devices, with plans to upscale.

UpScrolled does not include Israel as an option in its location selection menu. Cities such as Tel Aviv are included under "Occupied Territories of Palestine", and Palestine can also be set as the location.

UpScrolled says that it is against censorship and shadow banning, and describes itself as "belong[ing] to the people who use it — not to hidden algorithms or outside agendas". Hijazi said, "The other platforms claim to be free speech platforms. But when it comes to anything on Palestine, that's a different story." UpScrolled states that it "does not tolerate hate speech, propaganda, or bad-faith behaviour, but it also refuses to silence voices quietly or without explanation".

== User base and content ==
Al Jazeera reported that posts expressing pro-Palestinian sentiment or depicting the continued suffering in the Gaza Strip were "flooding" the app. Political and global issues such as the Gaza war are prominent. Content includes updates from the Gaza Freedom Flotilla, posts by doctors working in Gaza, video essays about Palantir’s influence within the military and calls for boycotts of Israel. It has been used by Gazans to crowdfund and record daily life. Celebrity users of UpScrolled include American labour activist Chris Smalls and actor Jacob Berger, both of whom were on the July 2025 Gaza Freedom Flotilla. Political figures have also joined UpScrolled, such as South African politician and Economic Freedom Fighters leader Julius Malema, and Islamic Revolutionary Guard Corps commander Esmail Qaani. One user said that most early users were attracted to the platform for the opportunity to criticize Zionism.

The Jewish Telegraphic Agency (JTA) reported that UpScrolled was observed to be "flooded" with antisemitic and anti-Israel content, including Holocaust denial and accusations that Israel carried out the 9/11 attacks. In a statement, UpScrolled said, "Our content moderation hasn't been able to keep up with the massive rise of users this week. We're working with digital rights experts to grow our Trust & Safety team and are beefing up our content moderation to prevent this. We apologise to all impacted users, thank you for being part of Upscrolled."

The Times reported in February 2026 that UpScrolled was hosting content that could potentially breach UK law, including antisemitic content and posts promoting Hamas, Hezbollah, Islamic State and Al-Qaeda, as well as footage of the 2019 Christchurch mosque shootings and content praising the perpetrators of the 2019 Halle synagogue shooting and 2018 Pittsburgh synagogue shooting. Antisemitic influencers Lucas Gage, Jake Shields, Stew Peters and Anastasia Maria Loupis have accounts on UpScrolled. UpScrolled’s policies prohibit threats, glorification of harm or support for terrorist or violent groups. Hijazi said harmful content was being uploaded to UpScrolled and the company had expanded its content moderation team and upgraded its technology infrastructure to deal with the issue. In May 2026, Moment magazine said that users had identified some antisemitic content, pornography and extremist videos on the platform. The magazine said there were gaps in content moderation due to the small size of the developer team.

== Reception ==
In January 2026, the Council on American–Islamic Relations (CAIR) praised UpScrolled for "pledging to protect the free flow of ideas on its platform, including both support for and opposition to the Israeli government's human rights abuses." Guy Christensen, a pro-Palestinian social media celebrity, has encouraged his audience to download UpScrolled. Christensen characterized UpScrolled as having "no censorship, no ownership by billionaires who put their interests and biases onto you to control you". He compared the platform to others like TikTok, saying that Israel is behind censorship that wouldn't happen on UpScrolled.

Jaigris Hodson, an associate professor of Interdisciplinary Studies at Royal Roads University in Canada, has argued that "Network effects mean that unless UpScrolled continues its explosive growth, people are unlikely to continue to choose it over the more established TikTok. At best, we might see a Twitter/X effect, which is where TikTok will host more pro-U.S. government content creators and those people who want to follow them, and UpScrolled will host more critical content creators and their followers."

== See also ==
- Xiaohongshu – Chinese social media and e-commerce platform (known in English as RedNote)
