= Verity =

Verity may refer to:

- Truth or veracity
- Verity (name), a given name and a surname
- Verity (statue), by Damien Hirst in Devon, England
- Verity (novel), by Colleen Hoover
  - Verity (film), a 2026 film adaptation by Michael Showalter
- Verity (web series), a 2026 Canadian animated horror set in the world of Minecraft
- Verity!, a podcast by Doctor Who fans running 2013–2026
- Verity Records, an American music label
- HMS Verity, a Royal Navy destroyer in service 1919–1947
- MV Verity, a British cargo ship in service 2001–2023
- Verity Films, British documentary film production company
