= Stew Peters =

American alt-right Internet personality

- Born: Minnesota, U.S.
- Occupation: Internet personality
- Known for: Promotion of conspiracy theories
- Notable work: These Little Ones; Watch the Water; Died Suddenly; Final Days
- Movement: Anti-vaccine; Antisemitism; White supremacy
- Children: 3
- Website: stewpeters.com

Stewart Peters is an American alt-right internet personality. He is known for promoting COVID-19 misinformation and conspiracy theories, homophobia, transphobia, and antisemitic and white supremacist beliefs such as Holocaust denial. He has also espoused Indophobic sentiments.

Having previously been a rapper and bounty hunter, Peters launched the Stew Peters Show in 2020, which airs on weekdays. His show routinely features conspiracy theories about governmental organizations, such as the CDC. His guests have included established proponents of conspiracy theories such as Paul Gosar, Mark Meadows, as well as Kash Patel. In 2022, Peters released the anti-vaccine film Died Suddenly, and a subsequent 2023 film titled Final Days.

== Early life and education ==
Peters grew up in Minnesota. Initially, Peters thought he would become a police officer or an entertainer during high school. As a teenager, Peters was convicted for stealing stereo equipment from a RadioShack where he worked.

== Career ==
=== Entertainment ===
After high school, Peters moved from Minnesota to Los Angeles, Florida and New York while pursuing a career as a rapper named Fokiss. As a rapper, he performed at several night clubs and bars around Minneapolis and Duluth including 7th St. Entry at the landmark 1st Avenue. He briefly interned at 101.3 KDWB-FM in 1998.

In 2000, he auditioned for a film directed by Tyrel Ventura, the son of then-Minnesota governor Jesse Ventura. After obtaining a lead role in the film, Peters lied to Ventura that his brother was a teen heartthrob who starred in a popular 1990s sitcom. Tyrel invited Peters to stay at the governor's residence in St. Paul during filming. Peters went home to Apple Valley, a suburb 16 miles away, and later moved into the guest room of the Governor's Residence for several weeks, until he was evicted by the state troopers providing security for the governor.

=== Bounty hunting ===
Peters was a bounty hunter before producing internet content. He started moonlighting as a bounty hunter after he met someone in the business.

Peters said he headed a bounty hunting agency named Twin Cities Apprehension Team for several years.

In 2006, Peters was arrested in Florida for falsely impersonating an officer, unlawfully using a blue light and stealing less than $300 using a weapon. The charges were later dropped.

In 2015, Minnesota Law was changed to limit what bounty hunters can wear and drive, a change apparently aimed specifically at Peters, who dressed to resemble law enforcement officers.

On May 30, 2017, Peters' agency was involved in a shootout that left two agents and the fugitive dead. TCAT had tracked Ramon Hutchinson, wanted for failure to appear for a DUI court date, from Minnesota to Greenville, Texas. TCAT used an automobile tracking device to find Hutchinson. When two agents (Gabriel Bernal and Fidel Garcia Jr) approached Hutchinson, he pulled out a gun and opened fire. Both agents and the fugitive died.

Peters' bounty hunting agency closed in 2021 after Peters was found guilty of disorderly conduct related to a domestic disturbance situation and was sentenced to probation.

=== Online personality ===
Peters launched The Stew Peters Show as a podcast in 2020, commenting on criminality and related topics, also giving air time to figures of the American far-right and the anti-vaccination movement (such as Del Bigtree). Peters uses his show to initiate or amplify a large number of rumors and fabrications widely known to be disinformation. He uses violent rhetoric against marginalized groups, most notably Jews, Hindus, and the LGBTQ community. He promotes concepts linked to QAnon and white supremacy, and has expressed support for Pizzagate and flat earth conspiracy theories. Because of his ability to incite his numerous followers to harass those he targets, extremism researcher Katie McCarthy has compared him to Alex Jones.

Peters interviewed several high-ranking figures of the Make America Great Again wing of the Republican Party, such as President Trump's nominee for Director of the FBI Kash Patel, who appeared multiple times. Peters spoke at the 2022 America First Political Action Conference, where he called for the murders of Anthony Fauci (lynched by hanging), and Vernon Jones (executed by electric chair).

In February 2023, following the Ohio train derailment, a tweet by Peters claiming that "journalists covering the story have been arrested" and dead fish and cattle were being found "as far as 100 miles away from the site" went viral, attracting about half a million likes. Only one journalist had been arrested.

In the summer of 2023, Peters claimed that the wildfires in Canada and the ones in Hawaii were the result of attacks by orbital energy weapon platforms, similarly to Marjorie Taylor Greene's statement about "Jewish space lasers". Experts have explained why this statement by Peters is clearly incorrect.

Peters has called for the execution of Hunter Biden, Anthony Fauci, Catholic Charities workers, Taylor Swift, and Travis Kelce for reasons ranging from Kelce promoting COVID-19 vaccines and the Catholic Charities workers aiding migrants to Biden being a "presidential failson" and Swift promoting "witchcraft". According to Peters' executive producer Lauren Witzke, "It's not a Stew Peters rally unless we're calling for executions."

Peters is identified as the communications director of a militia movement headed by one Edward Lang, who served a four year prison sentence awaiting trial on charges that included assaulting a police officer during the January 6 United States Capitol attack. The North American Patriot and Liberty Militia was organized in 2024 in order to be ready to take action during the 2024 United States presidential election. The same year, he called on his supporters to start gathering books they dislike from public libraries in anticipation of a book burning event he plans to organize.

In 2025, Peters and podcast guest comedian Leonarda Jonie both became the subject of controversy from comments made about Ohio born 2024 United States Presidential candidate Vivek Ramaswamy. Jonie later stated on social media that she would not rest until Ramaswamy was deported back to the country he came from and referring to India as a "shit hole." The comments brought about widespread condemnation.

=== Promotion of white supremacist and antisemitic rhetoric ===
Peters has promoted many white supremacist and antisemitic conspiracy theories and talking points. He has referred to Judaism as a "death cult built on the blood of murdered babies". He claimed that the Titan submersible implosion was intentionally caused by the Federal Reserve to prevent investigations into the Titanic, and agreed with a guest who blamed the Rothschild family and claimed they control the Federal Reserve. He has repeatedly promoted the white genocide and Great Replacement conspiracy theories. Peters has also denied or downplayed the Holocaust. During a show in early 2024, he stated: "The gas chambers, the crematoriums, so often discussed—they were destroyed at the end of World War II if they were ever there in the first place." He also cast doubt on the number of Jews murdered in the Holocaust.

Peters frequently rants about the "Jewish lobby/mafia" and Talmud on social media, claiming it promotes "sick gender ideology" and condones pedophilia.

He has falsely claimed that Black people are genetically prone to committing crime, and has referred to Somali refugees in Minnesota as "double-digit IQ savages" who are "conquering" the state by "replacing" its flag, referencing perceived similarities to the flag of Jubaland. Peters has hosted noted white supremacists and antisemites such as Nick Fuentes, Peter Brimelow, and Steven Anderson on his show. Brimelow is the founder of the alt-right website VDARE, which Peters recommended his followers read, calling its writers "brilliant."

In 2022, Peters started the eponymous Stew Peters Network. That same year, he gave white nationalist Dalton Clodfelter a show on the network, called The Right Dissident, through which Clodelter called for the establishment of a "far-right authoritarian government" in the U.S. to "reestablish a Christ-like nation." Former Georgia gubernatorial candidate Kandiss Taylor was also given a show, entitled Jesus Guns Babies, based on her campaign slogan, on which she espoused conspiracy theories like weather control. Paul Harrell, a writer and radio show host for the far-right news site National File, also had a show on the network, called The Millstone Report, on which he pushed the Great Replacement conspiracy theory.

During the Gaza war, Peters promoted antisemitic and anti-Palestinian rhetoric, and suggested that the 2023 October 7 attacks had never happened. Katie McCarthy, a researcher for the Anti-Defamation League's Center on Extremism, said that Peters was one of a group of far-right influencers "trying to exploit the crisis in Israel and Gaza right now to promote their own hatred for the Jewish community."

In January 2024, Peters published a series of tweets insulting Martin Luther King Jr., including a claim that he "stud[ied] Jewish Bolshevism", a common antisemitic conspiracy theory, and claimed that the New York City synagogue tunnel incident was a coverup for child sex trafficking. He has also claimed that Jews and Israel orchestrated the January 6 attack in the U.S. in order to discredit American nationalists, and has promoted the neo-Nazi propaganda film Europa: The Last Battle.

In April 2025, he said he wants a "final solution" to remove Jews from the United States. That May, he was banned by a Virginia hotel from speaking at a conference for veterans of the 1967 USS Liberty incident after StopAntisemitism, a pro-Israel doxxing group, posted a flyer for the event that included Peters and antisemites Lucas Gage and Jake Shields.

==== COVID-19 misinformation ====
From early in the pandemic, Peters joined other conspiracy theorists in peddling disinformation about COVID vaccines and public health measures.

Peters misrepresents scientific communications, and presents baseless theories as fact, to promote common conspiratorial disinformation narratives; COVID vaccination is part of an attempted genocide, military personnel get HIV from the vaccine, and that vaccinated people are frequently victims of strokes and penile rot.

In 2022, Peters started to produce long videos: These Little Ones, promoting the QAnon conspiracy about elites kidnapping children to drink their blood; Watch the Water, which claims that COVID-19 vaccines are derived from snake venom in order to transform people into "a hybrid of Satan," and Died Suddenly, which promotes misinformation about COVID-19 vaccines and Great Reset conspiracy theories. Peters publishes the videos on Rumble, using Twitter and Facebook to amplify their distribution. His 2024 production alleges the political class of the United states is controlled by a Jewish cabal.

Peters' Twitter account was suspended for a few months for breaching the platform's content policies, but was reactivated in mid-December 2022. Spotify and iHeartRadio have removed his content from their platform.

===== Final Days =====
On May 30, 2023, Peters released a film titled Final Days on Twitter. The film features Karen Kingston, a former Pfizer employee and anti-vaccine activist who is presented as a biotech analyst and legal advisor. However, Lead Stories found that Kingston sold Viagra and did not work on the Pfizer vaccine.

In the film, Kingston promotes various false claims, including that the mRNA vaccines are bioweapons and that the COVID-19 vaccines contain graphene oxide. David Martin, a conspiracy theorist YouTuber and financial analyst, falsely claims that the SARS-CoV-1 virus was developed at the University of North Carolina. The film implies that Event 201 shows that the COVID-19 pandemic was known about beforehand, and includes footage from the far-right activist group Project Veritas in which an alleged Pfizer executive talks about gain-of-function research at Pfizer. It ends with Kingston claiming that World War III has started, and that the culprits are the World Economic Forum and the Great Reset.

=== Political involvement ===
Starting in 2022, Peters has been speaking at political events, favoring the more extreme varieties of American conservatism. He endorsed the unsuccessful candidate Kandiss Taylor in the Republican primary for the 2022 Georgia gubernatorial election, and also supported Janice McGeachin and Wendy Rogers, both of whom appeared on Peters' podcast. He also spoke at a campaign rally for McGeachin later that spring, during which he claimed that political enemies of the candidate (such as "Republicans in name only," or "RINOs" and Democrats) were "possessed by demons" and wanted to "rape our children." Peters has also interviewed Senate candidate and senior advisor to the United States Agency for Global Media (USAGM) Kari Lake (known for promoting Trump's false claims of winning the 2020 presidential election), FBI Director Kash Patel and GOP congressmen Paul Gosar, Pete Sessions and Andy Biggs.

=== Cryptocurrency ===
Peters is the creator of $JPROOF, a meme coin that bills itself as a "Jew proof" alternative to the mainstream financial system and to other cryptocurrencies that he alleges are rug pulling scams. When Peters interviewed a student who was suspended from Temple University for antisemitic speech, Peters gifted the student one million $JPROOF coins.

== Legal issues ==
In February 2021, Peters was arrested after his wife called the police, saying that he had come home drunk and started throwing objects around the house. Peters later pleaded guilty to a charge of disorderly conduct and was sentenced to probation. Peters abandoned his bounty hunting business in this period.

In 2023, Peters was sued by the general manager of the London Bridge Resort in Lake Havasu City, Arizona, Cal Sheehy, who is also Mayor of Lake Havasu City. He alleged that Peters defamed him on his show in September 2022, over a drag show that was due to be held at the resort in February 2023. Peters allegedly shared Sheehy's contact information with his viewers, which is said to have resulted in threatening calls against him. As of August 2023, the case was to be heard by an Arizona court.

In February 2024, Peters falsely accused gay influencer José Rolón of sexually abusing his own children in several videos. Peters's followers subsequently sent threatening messages to Rolón. In June, Peters took down the videos after Rolón sent a cease and desist and threatened to sue Peters for defamation. That August, Rolón filed a defamation lawsuit against Peters.

In April 2024, Peters sued the producers of Died Suddenly, including Lauren Witzke, for allegedly acting as its owners, falsely advertising a sequel and collecting donations on his behalf. Witzke, Edward Szall, Matthew Skow, and Nicholas Stumphauzer were identified as the defendants.

== Personal life ==
Peters has two sons and a daughter. He has coached his sons' hockey teams.
