= Anastasia Maria Loupis =

Danish physician and far-right activist

Anastasia Maria Loupis (born 28 November 1978) is a Danish physician and far-right activist. She is known for her anti-transgender and anti-vaccine activism, and for espousing antisemitic, pro-Palestinian and anti-Israel rhetoric during the Gaza war.

== Early life and career ==
Loupis is of Greek descent. In August 2014, Loupis co-authored a research paper suggesting the use of percutaneous closure of the left atrial appendage as an alternative to oral anticoagulation for preventing strokes.

== Activism ==
Loupis initially became prominent for her opposition to COVID-19 vaccination and promotion of COVID-19 conspiracy theories. She has posted an edited video of Bill Gates insinuating that he aims to use vaccines for population control and shared an article by The Washington Times which falsely claimed that "Vaccines don't work, masks don't work: Everything government told us about COVID-19 was wrong."

Loupis is a vocal critic of gender-affirming surgery and rights for gay and transgender people. In July 2023, she praised Russia for passing a law banning gender-affirming care for trans people. That month, she also tweeted, "There is no such thing as 'man made climate change' so why does the World Economic Forum want people to eat bugs, micro plastics, fake meat, seed oils, and air proteins?"

In December 2024, Loupis criticized Elon Musk for his support of an immigration program for skilled foreign workers. Her engagement on X (formerly Twitter) subsequently collapsed. In January 2025, she said she was planning to sue Musk, saying, "It has turned out to be all lies from him. It's disappointing because we supported him and believed in him very, very much."

=== Gaza war ===
Following the 2023 October 7 attacks on Israel and the subsequent Gaza war, Loupis switched to posting pro-Palestinian and antisemitic content. According to Rolling Stone writer Miles Klee, Loupis was one of many online accounts that had co-opted the Palestinian cause to make money or frame their antisemitic rhetoric as anti-Zionism.

In October 2023, Loupis blamed supporters of Israel for "forcing" the COVID-19 vaccines onto people. In April 2024, she claimed that US president Joe Biden's government was dominated by Jewish people. She has also posted misinformation about the war, such as a doctored photo showing IDF soldiers holding the ISIS flag and falsely claiming that Hezbollah had killed IDF chief Herzi Halevi during its drone strike on Binyamina.

In May 2024, Loupis was announced as a VIP guest at the America First Political Action Conference, a white nationalist political conference founded by far-right activist Nick Fuentes. In response to the cancellation of the conference, she posted on social media, "Nick was right. America is Israel-occupied territory. America is a banana republic. Jews have no power." That July, she asserted that the official X account of the Palestinian-led Boycott, Divestment and Sanctions (BDS) movement is Jewish.

In January 2026, Loupis announced she would be joining UpScrolled, a pro-Palestinian social media platform launched in June 2025. That April, she was included in a list published by Israel's Ministry of Diaspora Affairs and Combating Antisemitism of 10 figures it said were driving antisemitic and anti-Zionist discourse online, alongside figures such as Candace Owens, Nick Fuentes, Tucker Carlson and Dan Bilzerian, and critics of Israel such as activist Greta Thunberg.

== Personal life ==
Loupis lives in Copenhagen, Denmark. She has a daughter.
