= LifeSiteNews =

Far-right anti-abortion advocacy and news publication

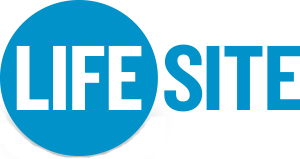
- Logo

- Screenshot Homepage in May 2021
- Website type: Advocacy and news publication
- Available in: English
- Founded: 1997; 29 years ago
- Country of origin: Canada
- Founder: Campaign Life Coalition
- Editor: John-Henry Westen
- President: Steve Jalsevac
- Website: www.lifesitenews.com
- Current status: Active

LifeSiteNews, or simply LifeSite, is a Canadian Catholic advocacy and news publication. Founded by Campaign Life Coalition, it focuses primarily on opposition to abortion and also publishes Catholic and socially conservative commentary. It has been described by several sources as far-right, and has been criticised by fact-checking and media organisations for publishing misleading information, conspiracy theories, and COVID-19 misinformation. In 2021, it was banned from some social media platforms for violating policies on COVID-19 misinformation.

== History ==
LifeSiteNews was founded in 1997 by the Canadian political lobbyist organization Campaign Life Coalition with the intent to promote anti-abortion views. At a 2013 March for Life Youth Conference in Ottawa, founder and editor-in-chief John-Henry Westen alleged there was a media conspiracy against the anti-abortion movement, and said that the purpose of LifeSiteNews was to circumvent the mainstream media.

Raymond Gravel, a Catholic priest and former member of the Canadian Parliament, filed a defamation lawsuit in Quebec against the website in 2011. He stated that the site's description of his self-described "pro-choice" views as "pro-abortion" was libelous, and sought CA$500,000 in damages. LifeSiteNews had published 41 articles about Gravel as of February 2013. In 2013, the lawsuit was allowed to advance to trial by a Quebec court. Gravel died of lung cancer on August 11, 2014.

In 2018, LifeSiteNews claimed to have a readership of 20 million. Its editor-in-chief is John-Henry Westen, and the president is Steve Jalsevac. The Campaign Life Coalition no longer runs LifeSiteNews, although the two groups share some board members.

On 31 October and 1 November 2023, LifeSiteNews held a conference called Rome Life Forum in Rome, Italy. Held immediately after the Synod on Synodality, the two-day "strategy conference" was aimed at confronting the supposed "evils of the Deep Church and Deep State and their involvement in the Great Reset agenda" and at "learn[ing] and work[ing] out together how we as Christ's faithful can combat this diabolical movement under the direction of Our Lady." At the forum, Joseph Strickland read out a letter that he attributed to a "friend". This letter included the question: "Would you now allow this one [Francis] who has pushed aside the true Pope [Benedict XVI] and has attempted to sit on a chair that is not his define what the church is to be?" Strickland described the letter as "challenging" but did not dispute this accusation. The letter also described Francis as an "usurper of Peter's chair" and "an expert at producing cowards." Strickland then claimed that Francis backed an "attack on the sacred". Strickland would later be removed by Pope Francis from his post as bishop for the Diocese of Tyler, Texas on 11 November 2023.

On 8 July 2025 it was officially announced by Jalsevac that Westen had been removed as CEO and editor-in-chief after a steep drop in readership and falloff of donors in recent years. However, on 18 July, it was announced that the website's board had restored Westen to his positions "subject to administrative review and investigation."

== Content and views ==
LifeSiteNews was founded for the purpose of opposing legal abortion, and that remains a primary focus. It also regularly publishes articles expressing opposition to contraception, homosexuality, and transgender rights, and its website names euthanasia and cloning among other issues it opposes. A Catholic publication, many of its articles are faith-related. It published many articles critical of Pope Francis while he was alive, and regularly publishes writing by critics of Francis including Italian archbishop, former Vatican diplomat, and conspiracy theorist Carlo Maria Viganò, as well as Cardinal Raymond Burke.

LifeSiteNews has been described as far-right, conservative, social conservative, and ultraconservative. Fact-checking website Snopes described LifeSiteNews in 2016 as "a known purveyor of misleading information". Paul Moses wrote for Commonweal in 2021 that LifeSiteNews coverage "feigns journalistic accuracy, but misleads through omission". The Canadian Anti-Hate Network described the website in a 2021 report as a "Christian version of Breitbart".

In August 2018, The Advocate reported that LifeSiteNews was publishing articles linking the Catholic Church sexual abuse cases to homosexuality. Political Research Associates analyst Heron Greenesmith categorized LifeSiteNews to NBC News in September 2019 as a member of the "Christian-right anti-transgender disinformation ecosystem" and stated, "LifeSite platforms the small number of anti-trans researchers, academics, and right-wing professional associations, giving their work a veneer of scientific validity." Brennan Suen of the watchdog group Media Matters for America said that LifeSite "typically refuses to acknowledge transgender identities and serially misgenders trans folk in its coverage", and that it "refers to the abhorrent practice of conversion therapy as treating 'unwanted homosexual attraction.'" Moses wrote in Commonweal that the site spread confusion about COVID-19, and that their coverage "is so slanted that anyone relying on it would be terribly misled on what the science shows".

LifeSiteNews regularly publishes conspiracy theories. The site has published misleading claims about the attempts to overturn the results of the 2020 presidential election by Donald Trump and his supporters, as well as articles supportive of the "Stop the Steal" campaign with the same goal. Some articles on the website use the tag "New World Order", the name of a conspiracy theory which hypothesizes a secretly emerging totalitarian world government. LifeSiteNews has published misinformation about COVID-19 vaccines. In November 2022, LifeSiteNews promoted the anti-vaccine film Died Suddenly.

== Social media bans ==
LifeSiteNews' Twitter accounts have been temporarily suspended at least four times since 2018; once in error, twice for violating rules against "targeted misgendering or deadnaming of transgender individuals", and once for violating rules against spreading COVID-19 misinformation.

LifeSiteNews' YouTube channel was banned in February 2021 for persistently promoting COVID-19 misinformation. One video claimed that COVID-19 was "the greatest hoax ever perpetrated on an unsuspecting public". Another promoted anti-vaccine sentiment, cast doubt on the efficacy of COVID-19 vaccines, and stated that COVID-19 "isn't really killing people right and left that weren't probably gonna die within the year anyway". These claims contradicted the scientific consensus and reports from authorities like the World Health Organization, and violated YouTube policies on promotion of health misinformation.

LifeSiteNews was permanently banned from Facebook in May 2021 for violations of policies prohibiting COVID-19 misinformation. According to LifeSiteNews, Facebook said the ban was related to their policy of removing anti-vaccination accounts, and a Facebook spokesperson allegedly accused LifeSiteNews of disseminating "false information about COVID-19 that could contribute to physical harm". A joint statement signed by Media Matters for America, GLAAD, the Human Rights Campaign, and NARAL Pro-Choice America said they had collected and reported to Facebook over 100 posts by LifeSiteNews that allegedly spread COVID-19 and vaccine-related misinformation. They added that they believed Facebook should have banned the group "years ago" for using the platform to "push its noxious anti-LGBTQ and anti-choice extremism".

== See also ==
- Church Militant (website) – Catholic media organization
