= Colleen Hoover =

American writer (born 1979)

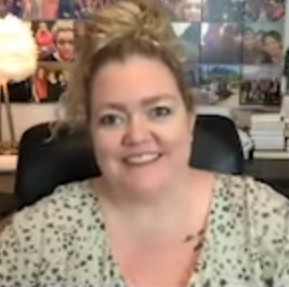
- Hoover in 2022
- Born: Margaret Colleen Fennell; December 11, 1979 (age 46); Sulphur Springs, Texas, U.S.
- Education: Texas A&M University, Commerce (BA)
- Occupations: Author; Social worker
- Spouse: Heath Hoover (m. 2000)
- Children: 3
- Writing career
- Genres: Young adult fiction and new adult fiction
- Notable work: It Ends with Us

Signature
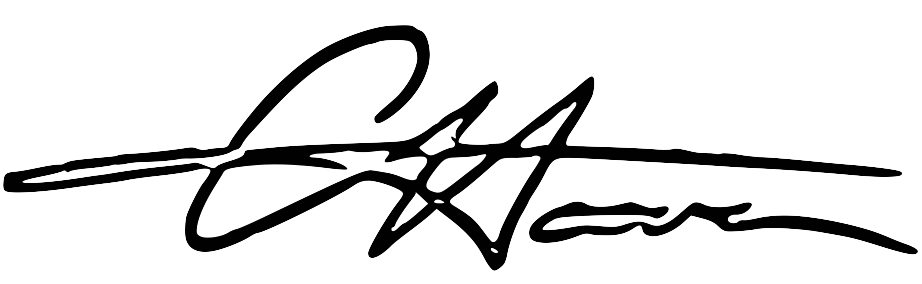

Margaret Colleen Hoover (née Fennell; born December 11, 1979) is an American author who primarily writes novels in the romance and young adult fiction genres. She is best known for her 2016 novel It Ends with Us. Many of her works were self-published before they were picked up by a publishing house. As of October 2022, Hoover had sold approximately 20 million books. She was named one of the 100 most influential people in the world by Time magazine in 2023.

== Early life ==
Hoover was born on December 11, 1979 in Sulphur Springs, Texas, to Vannoy Fite and Eddie Fennell. She grew up in Saltillo, Texas, and graduated from Saltillo High School in 1998. She graduated from Texas A&M University–Commerce with a degree in social work.

== Career ==
In November 2011, Hoover began writing her debut novel, Slammed, with no intention of getting published. She was inspired by a lyric, "decide what to be, and go be it," from an Avett Brothers song, "Head Full of Doubt/Road Full of Promise," and she incorporated Avett Brothers lyrics throughout the story. Hoover self-published Slammed in January 2012. She states that she published the novel so that her mother, who had just received an Amazon Kindle, could read it. A sequel, Point of Retreat, was published in February 2012. After a few months, Slammed was reviewed and given five stars by book blogger Maryse Black, and afterward, sales rapidly increased for Hoover's first two books. Slammed and Point of Retreat reached #8 and #18, respectively, on the New York Times Best Seller list, in August of that year. Atria Books picked up the novels and republished them on August 10, 2012. A third book in the series, This Girl, was published in April 2013. After the success of Slammed, Hoover quit her job in social work to become a full-time writer.

Hoover's novel Hopeless was self-published in December 2012 and features a girl who was home-schooled throughout her elementary education before she goes to a public high school. The book reached #1 on the New York Times Best Seller list and remained there for three weeks. It was the first self-published novel to ever top the list. A companion novel, Losing Hope, was published that July.

Finding Cinderella is a free novella that Hoover published in 2014. It features several of the characters that are depicted in her novels Hopeless and Losing Hope. A paperback was released with several bonus features, such as a new epilogue and Hoover's own "Cinderella story." Maybe Someday, published in March 2014, was the first novel of a small series about a boy and a girl who write music together and fall in love. Musician Griffin Peterson created a soundtrack to accompany the novel. Links in the e-book or a scannable QR code in the paperback led to a website, where readers could listen to the music.

Never Never, a collaboration with Tarryn Fisher, was originally sold as three separate novellas. The works were later republished as one complete book. This young adult thriller/romance novel features teenagers Silas and Charlie, who wake up with a loss of their memory. The book follows these characters as they work together to recover their memory, figuring out pieces of themselves as they go. Their journey uncovers lies and secrets as they get closer to finding out the truth. Never Never tells the story of Silas and Charlie's relationship evolving back to what it once was. In creating the novel, Hoover and Fisher alternated writing chapters and making edits to previously written content. The writers did not know where the story would end up, but Hoover stated that the experience was one of the most entertaining writing experiences she had ever had.

Hoover's novel It Ends with Us was published in 2016. Hoover described it as "the hardest book I've ever written." The novel contains domestic violence, and, according to Hoover, it was written with the intention of advocating for domestic violence victims. The story was inspired by Hoover's personal experience as a child growing up in a household with domestic violence, which carried through into her adult life. The book's main character, Lily, experiences domestic violence at a young age, witnesses her father's abuse towards her mother, experiences it firsthand, and then ends up in a violent relationship as an adult. As of 2019, the novel has sold over a million copies worldwide and has been translated into over twenty languages.

In 2021, Hoover experienced a surge in popularity due to attention from the BookTok community on TikTok. As a result, in January 2022, It Ends with Us was #1 on the New York Times Best Seller list. Production on a film adaptation of It Ends with Us, starring Blake Lively, began in May 2023. It was released in August 2024 to mixed critical reviews but large commercial success, grossing over $350 million worldwide. Hoover has stated, in interviews, that the inspiration for the novel was the domestic abuse that her mother endured. Its success has led to a competitive market for film adaptations of other Hoover titles, with multiple studios bidding on rights to bring her books to life on the screen.

A sequel to It Ends with Us, It Starts with Us, was published on October 18, 2022, by Atria Books. Simon & Schuster released the details of the extensive marketing campaign for the novel, which became the publisher's most-preordered book of all time. A planned coloring book for It Ends with Us was canceled in January 2023 following online backlash due to the novel's subject matter.

In October 2022, Simon & Schuster UK acquired two standalone novels by Hoover.

As of October 2022, Hoover has sold more than 20 million books. Reflecting on Hoover's success in 2022, Alexandra Alter of The New York Times wrote, "To say she's currently the best-selling novelist in the United States, to even compare her to other successful authors who have landed several books on the best seller lists, fails to capture the size and loyalty of her audience."

An adaptation of the 2022 novel Reminders of Him, self-screenwritten by Hoover and her producing partner Lauren Levine, starring Maika Monroe and fellow actor/author Lauren Graham, premiered in March 2026.

== Personal life ==
Hoover married Heath Hoover in 2000 and they have three sons. Hoover worked in social work and teaching jobs before starting her career as an author.

== Bibliography ==
=== Books ===
==== It Ends with Us series ====
- It Ends with Us (2016)
- It Starts with Us (2022)

==== Slammed series ====
- Slammed (2012)
- Point of Retreat (2012)
- This Girl (2013)

==== Hopeless series ====
- Hopeless (2012)
- Losing Hope (2013)
- Finding Cinderella (novella; 2013)
- All Your Perfects (2018)
- Finding Perfect (novella; 2019)

==== Maybe Someday series ====
- Maybe Someday (2014)
- Maybe Not (novella; 2014)
- Maybe Now (2018)

==== Standalone novels ====
- Ugly Love (2014)
- Never Never (2015, digital; 2023, physical) three part novella series with Tarryn Fisher
- Confess (2015)
- November 9 (2015)
- Too Late (2016)
- Without Merit (2017)
- Verity (2018)
- Regretting You (2019)
- Heart Bones (2020)
- Layla (2020)
- Reminders of Him (2022)
- Woman Down (2026)

=== Books in publishing order ===
- Slammed (2012)
- Point of Retreat (2012)
- Hopeless (2012)
- Losing Hope (2013)
- Finding Cinderella (novella; 2013)
- This Girl (2013)
- Maybe Someday (2014)
- Maybe Not (novella; 2014)
- Ugly Love (2014)
- Confess (2015)
- November 9 (2015)
- Never Never (2015, digital; 2023, physical) three part novella series with Tarryn Fisher
- It Ends with Us (2016)
- Too Late (2016)
- Without Merit (2017)
- Maybe Now (2018)
- Verity (2018)
- All Your Perfects (2018)
- Regretting You (2019)
- Heart Bones (2020)
- Layla (2020)
- It Starts with Us (2022)
- Reminders of Him (2022)
- Woman Down (2026)

=== Short stories ===
- "A Father's Kiss" from The Kiss (An Anthology of Love and Other Close Encounters)
- "Saint" from One More Step (An Anthology)
- "The Dress" from Two More Days (An Anthology)

== Film and television adaptations ==
Year	Title	Also features as		Notes
Year	Title	Screenwriter	Producer	Notes
2017	Confess	No	Executive	mini-series
2024	It Ends with Us	No	Executive	
2025	Regretting You	No	Executive	
2026	Reminders of Him	Yes	Yes	
2026	Verity	No	Yes	

== Accolades ==
=== Literary awards ===
Year	Work	Award	Category	Result	Ref.
2012	Slammed	Goodreads Choice Awards	Young Adult Fiction	Nominated	
2013	Losing Hope	Goodreads Choice Awards	Romance	Nominated	
2013	This Girl	Goodreads Choice Awards	Romance	Nominated	
2014	Maybe Someday	UtopYA Con Awards	Innovative Marketing	Won	
2015	Confess	Goodreads Choice Awards	Romance	Won	
2016	It Ends with Us	Goodreads Choice Awards	Romance	Won	

=== New York Times Best Sellers ===
In 2022, Hoover held six of the top ten spots on the New York Times paperback fiction bestseller list.

- Slammed (#8)
- Point of Retreat (#18)
- This Girl (#9)
- Hopeless (#1)
- Losing Hope (#6)
- Maybe Someday (#3)
- Ugly Love (#4)
- Confess (#4)
- November 9 (#9)
- It Ends with Us (#1)
- Verity (#2)

== See also ==
- New adult fiction
