= You'll own nothing and be happy =

Phrase used by critics of the World Economic Forum

A screenshot, frequently shared and disseminated by critics, of a WEF promotional video featuring the phrase

"You'll own nothing and you'll be happy" (alternatively "You'll own nothing and be happy") is a phrase originally published by the World Economic Forum (WEF) and based on a 2016 essay by the Danish politician Ida Auken about a future prediction in which a person relies on the sharing economy for most of their needs. The phrase from the article "Welcome to 2030", and the philosophies expressed within it, have been used by critics who accuse the economical elites of desiring restrictions on ownership of personal property.

== Background ==
The Danish politician Ida Auken had previously written in 2014 about a hackathon at the WEF that proposed "FridgeFlix", a startup that would allow users to lease all of their household appliances from a provider that would also service and upgrade these appliances. The proposed company would reduce the risk of residents incurring costly repairs and would work with energy suppliers to reduce power consumption of appliances.

In 2016, Auken published an essay originally titled "Welcome to 2030. I own nothing, have no privacy, and life has never been better", later retitled "Here's how life could change in my city by the year 2030", on the WEF's official website. It described life in an unnamed city in which the narrator does not own a car, a house, any appliances, or any clothes, and instead relies on shared services for all of his daily needs. Auken later added an author's note to the story responding to critics, stating that it is not her "utopia or dream of the future", and that she intended for the essay to start discussions about technological development.

== Contemporary reaction ==
The WEF published an article and a video in 2018 based in part on Auken's essay. Social media users shared a frame from the video, depicting an unidentified man smiling with a digital on-screen graphic reading "You'll own nothing. And you'll be happy" superimposed, adding criticism of Auken's views. The WEF clarified that it has no stated goal to have individuals "own nothing and be happy", and that its Agenda 2030 framework includes individual ownership and control over private property.

In 2017, a writer for The Independent described Auken's essay as being in line with the principles of the sharing economy, noting that the United Kingdom already had online services to allow users to share property, storage space, cars, designer apparel, tools, and other expensive items. A cofounder of Fat Llama, a rental web site, observed that people who buy expensive items like DSLR cameras and drones opt for more expensive, higher-end models so that they can rent them out to recoup their costs.

Also in 2017, a commentator for European Digital Rights (EDRi) described Auken's article as "chilling" and "dystopian". EDRi criticized Auken's vision of centralized property ownership as a "benevolent dictatorship".

== Reaction during COVID pandemic ==
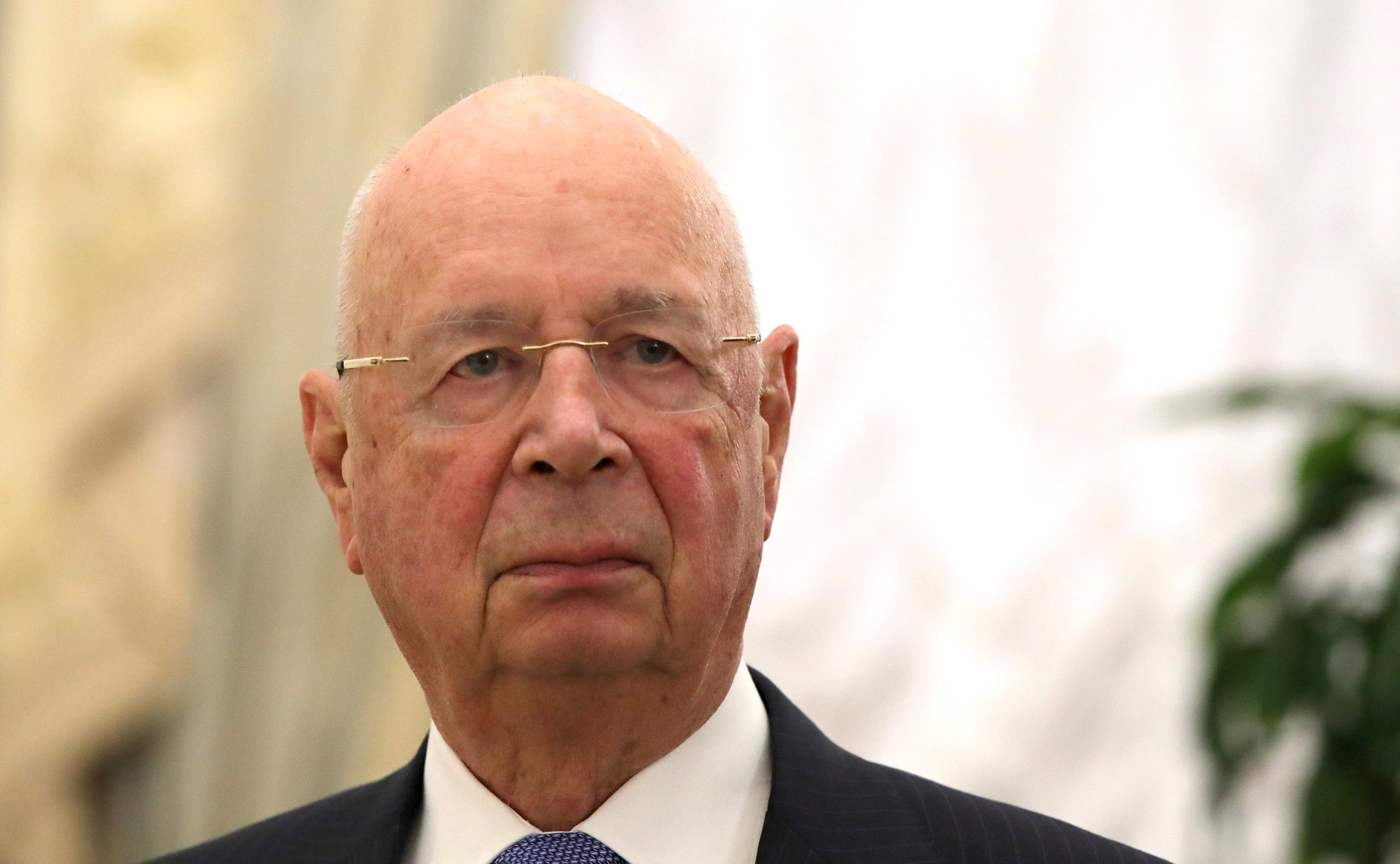
Photos of Klaus Schwab, founder of the WEF, are often used to illustrate the phrase online especially in memes.

Although Auken's essay was published more than three years before the COVID-19 pandemic, the phrase gained currency among critics of the WEF after the organization announced the Great Reset initiative for global economic recovery after the pandemic. In 2023, Jim Geraghty wrote in National Review, referring to the WEF, "Very few of us see owning our own homes, owning our own cars, and owning our own clothes as a major problem to be solved, the sort of crisis that requires Danish legislators and global business elites to gather and come up with a plan to rescue us."

Adrian Monck, the WEF's managing director, traced the phrase's memetic origin to a 4chan post which read, "Own nothing, be happy — The Jew World Order 2030". According to Monck, during the pandemic, far-right groups and individuals started pushing the phrase on 4chan and its /pol/ board to promote a conspiracy theory that the pandemic was "orchestrated" by the WEF "to take control of the global economy"; the phrase became viral and was spread by sources including Fox News and Sky News Australia, and popular content creators like Russell Brand shared it with their audiences. Monck said that the WEF removed all media related to Auken's essay from its website "because of the online abuse and threats she had faced". In an interview with CBC News, Monck blamed state-sponsored disinformation campaigns and antisemitic canards for the spread of false conspiracy theories concerning the WEF.

A Reuters fact check noted that claims about the WEF have been conflated with criticism of the United Nations' Sustainable Development Goals, which has "property ownership available to all" by 2030 as a stated goal.

== Post-COVID reaction ==
In the years after the peak of COVID Pandemic, the phrase mostly stopped being used for conspiracy theories and critiques aimed directly at the World Economic Forum. Instead, the phrase started being mostly used to illustrate corporate attempts at undermine consumer rights and the idea of private ownership, specially inside video-game and right-to-repair circles, as physical media is being phased out by corporate decisions.

An example of post-covid use of the term is how Louis Rossman, an advocate for consumer rights and right-to-repair, often uses the phrase as ilustrative of what he sees as corporate greed while dismissing the conspiracy theory side of it, for example, in a video about a BMW subscription scandal, he quotes the phrase saying "The reason we live in the world that we live in is, again, not because of some crazy red pill evil conspiracy with the ‘you will own nothing’ thing and the Klaus Schwab and the World Economic Forum. At the end of the day, none of that stuff would be able to take place if it wasn’t for us (the consumers). I firmly believe this is not some sort of evil conspiracy amongst a bunch of people sitting in a room. It’s us".

== See also ==
- Consumer rights
- Agenda 2030
- Fourth Industrial Revolution
- Technological Singularity
