= The Official It Ends with Us Coloring Book =

Coloring book by Colleen Hoover

- Author: Colleen Hoover
- Illustrator: Emma Taylor
- Language: English
- Genre: Coloring book
- Publisher: Atria Books
- Publication place: United States
- ISBN: 9781668026526

The Official It Ends with Us Coloring Book is a coloring book by author Colleen Hoover and illustrator Emma Taylor to accompany Hoover's 2016 romance novel It Ends with Us. The book was announced in January 2023, but canceled the next day after online backlash due to the novel's subject matter of domestic violence.

== Overview ==
The novel It Ends with Us follows Lily Bloom, a young college graduate who struggles to end the cycle of domestic violence in her family. After marrying her controlling and abusive husband Ryle, she reconnects with her childhood friend and first love Atlas. Some readers have criticized the marketing of It Ends with Us as a romance novel, since the book's main relationship is abusive.

According to the publisher Atria Books, the coloring book would "immerse" readers in Lily's world, including quotes from the novel and 30 illustrations of the novel's "most iconic scenes and settings".

== Publication history ==
Hoover announced the coloring book in January 2023, with a planned publication date of April. Following backlash and criticism online, Hoover posted a statement on Instagram the next day, saying she would ask the publisher not to continue with the project. She wrote that the coloring book "was developed with Lily’s strength in mind, but I can absolutely see how this was tone-deaf. I hear you guys and I agree with you." Atria Books confirmed the book's cancellation, adding: "We developed this book to be uplifting and empowering, mirroring Lily Bloom’s story; we appreciate the feedback and discourse and have the greatest respect for Colleen Hoover's fans."

== Reception ==
Soon after the coloring book's announcement, fans of It Ends with Us noted the potential conflict between the coloring book format and the novel's treatment of domestic violence. Many readers criticized the concept on TikTok, while Goodreads reviewers gave the book an average rating of one star. Some wondered if the book would "romanticize" abuse, such as by including an illustration of the scene where Ryle pushes Lily down the stairs. The Mary Sue expressed concerns that a coloring book would appeal to underage readers, arguing that "Hoover’s audience is largely comprised of impressionable young people who could be taking a lot of the wrong messages from what she’s writing."

Other fans of It Ends with Us were open to the idea of a coloring book, saying that the novel does not promote domestic abuse and that critics should wait to see the book's illustrations.
