= Ida Auken =

Danish politician (born 1978)

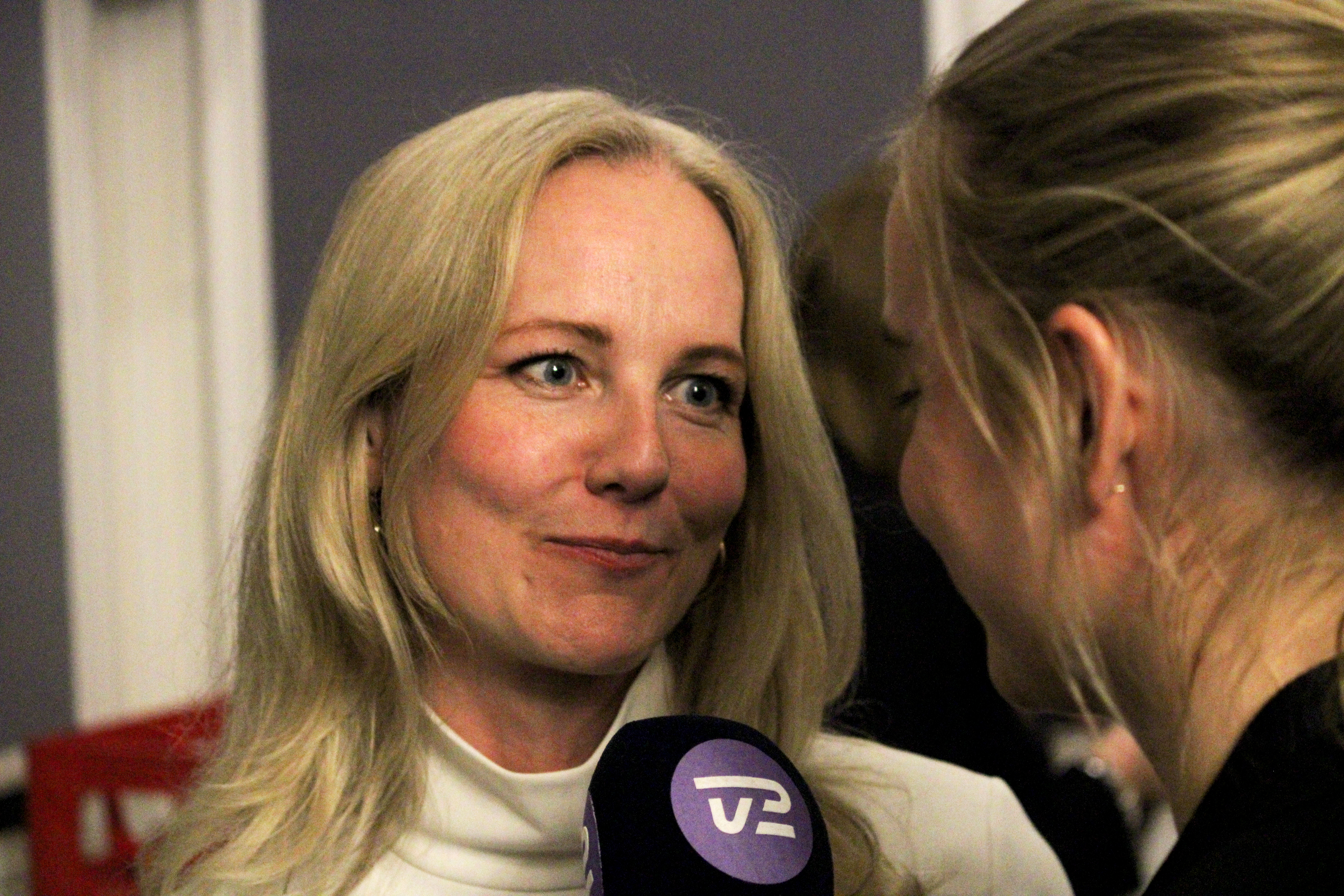
- Auken in 2026

Minister of Health and Ecclesiastical Affairs
- Incumbent
- Assumed office 3 June 2026
- Prime Minister: Mette Frederiksen
- Preceded by: Sophie Løhde (Health); Morten Dahlin (Ecclesiastical Affairs)

Minister for the Environment
- In office 3 October 2011 – 3 February 2014
- Prime Minister: Helle Thorning-Schmidt
- Preceded by: Karen Ellemann
- Succeeded by: Kirsten Brosbøl

Member of the Folketing
- Incumbent
- Assumed office 13 November 2007
- Constituency: Copenhagen

Personal details
- Born: 22 April 1978 (age 48) Frederiksberg, Denmark
- Party: Social Democrats (since 2021)
- Other political affiliations: Green Left (until 2014); Social Liberal (2014–2021)
- Parent: Margrete Auken (mother)
- Education: University of Copenhagen

Ida Margrete Meier Auken (born 22 April 1978) is a Danish politician and member of the Folketing for the Social Democrats political party. She has been a member of parliament since 2007. She was Minister for the Environment of Denmark from 2011 to 2014. Until 2014 she was a member of the Socialist People's Party, after which she moved to the Danish Social Liberal Party. In 2021, she switched to the Social Democrats.

Internationally, Auken is best known for her 2016 article on the World Economic Forum (WEF), originally titled "Welcome to 2030. I own nothing, have no privacy, and life has never been better", summarized as "You'll own nothing and be happy", a phrase that has been used by critics who accuse the WEF of desiring restrictions on ownership of private property.

== Background ==
Her mother is Margrete Auken and her late uncle was Svend Auken. Like her mother, she is a priest of the Church of Denmark, having graduated with a Master's degree in theology from the University of Copenhagen in 2006.

Auken is a member of the advisory board of Vigga.us, a Danish company that produces organic children's clothing after the circular idea, so that the clothes can be rented and reused. Auken is also a member of Old Brick's advisory board, which is a Danish company that cleans and recycles used bricks. Auken is also member of the advisory board of EMG, an international CSR and sustainability consultancy founded in the Netherlands, which advises on sustainable development and cradle-to-cradle certified products.

== Political career ==
Originally a member of the Socialist People's Party, she switched to the Social Liberal Party in 2014.

In 2016, Auken wrote a piece for the World Economic Forum (WEF), later republished by Forbes, in which she imagined how technology could improve our lives by 2030 if the United Nations sustainable development goals (SDG) were realized through a fusion of technologies. In the presented scenario, the emergence and application of new digitalized technologies to sectors such as communication, energy, transportation, and accommodation would result in greater access and decreased cost (ultimately leading to a complete elimination of cost), eventually leading to the end of "lifestyle diseases, climate change, the refugee crisis, environmental degradation, completely congested cities, water pollution, air pollution, social unrest and unemployment" as well as other early 21st century crises. By the scenario's 2030 endpoint, anything that had once been a product will be a freely available service, obviating any need for personal ownership of goods or real estate. The article, originally titled "Welcome to 2030. I own nothing, have no privacy, and life has never been better", has been criticized as portraying an unrealistic utopia at the cost of privacy. In response, Auken added an author's note in which she said that the article merely represented a potential future scenario rather than any personal utopia of her own and that it was intended to "start a discussion about some of the pros and cons of the current technological development" in a way that she claimed conventional reports could not, while the article itself was renamed to "Here's how life could change in my city by the year 2030". Both versions of the article describe the loss of privacy as being undesirable. Auken's article, and an associated WEF video on predictions for 2030 in which the article was summarized as "You'll own nothing. And you'll be happy. Whatever you want you'll rent and it'll be delivered by drone", would later form part of commentary about the WEF, particularly following the announcement of a "Great Reset" in 2020.

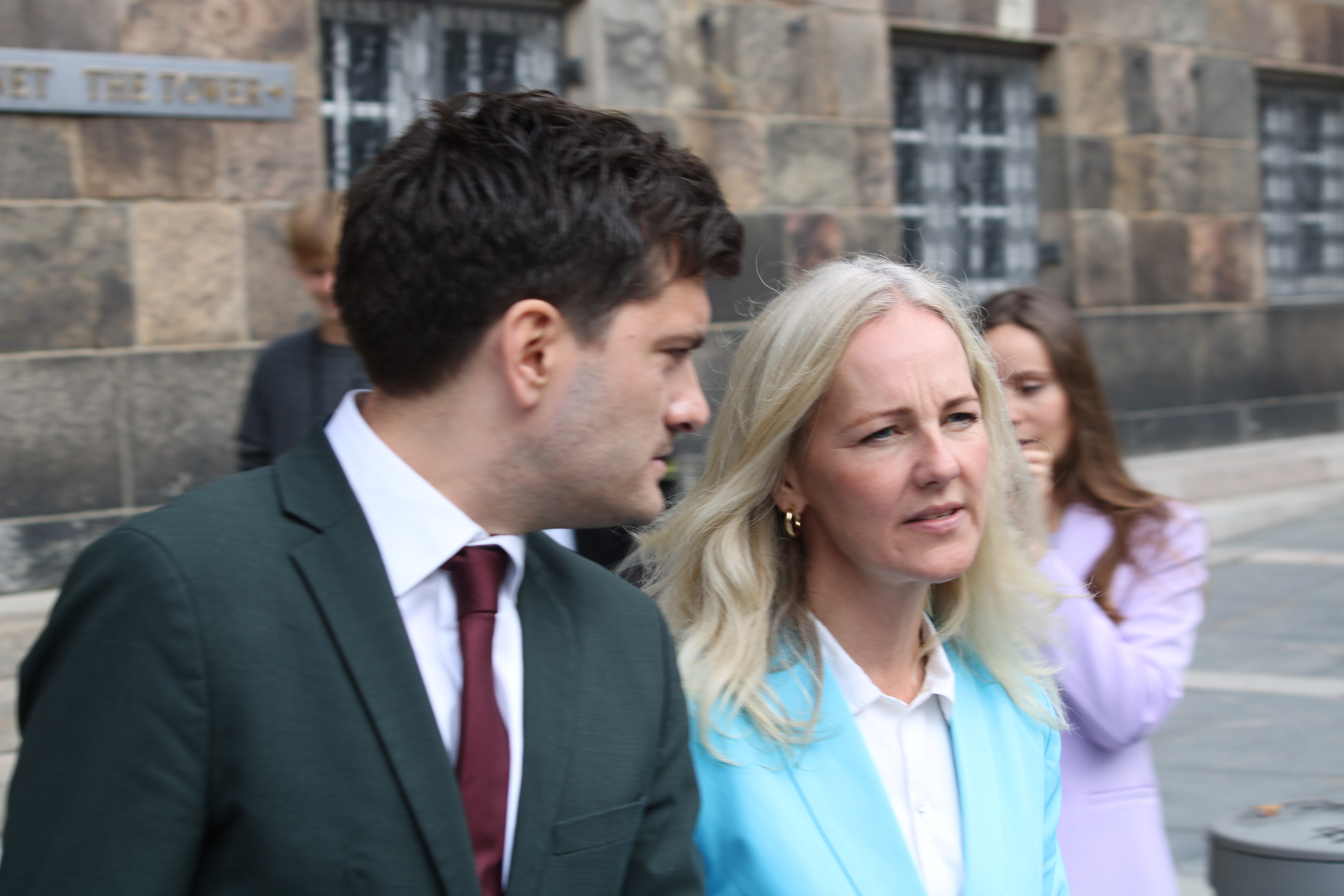
Auken with Frederik Vad at the 2025 opening of parliament

In 2019, Auken gained international attention when she recorded a Twitter and Facebook video countering Donald Trump's statements about wind power.

In 2021, Auken switched from the Social Liberal Party to the Social Democrats, stating the party had moved too far from the center. She was re-elected in the 2022 Danish general election, receiving 9,879 personal votes.

In 2022, Auken became spokeswoman on food and agriculture.

In 2023, Auken became chair of the Gender Equality Committee of the Danish Parliament.

== Other activities ==
- Deutsche Post Stiftung, Member of the Scientific Council
- World Economic Forum (WEF), Member of the Global Future Council on the Future of Future of Cities and Urbanization
- World Economic Forum (WEF), Member of the Europe Policy Group (since 2017)

== Bibliography ==
- Dansk (Danish) (2018)
- Livet efter døden i de store verdensreligioner (Life after Death in the World's Major Religions) (2006)
- Jesus går til filmen - Jesusfiguren i moderne film (Jesus Goes into Films – the Jesus Figure in Modern Films) (2007)
- Konstellationer - kirkerne og det europæiske projekt (Constellations – the Church and the European Project) (2007)

Political offices
Preceded by Karen Ellemann	Minister for the Environment; 2011 - 2014	Succeeded by Kirsten Brosbøl
