= Guy Christensen =

American political commentator

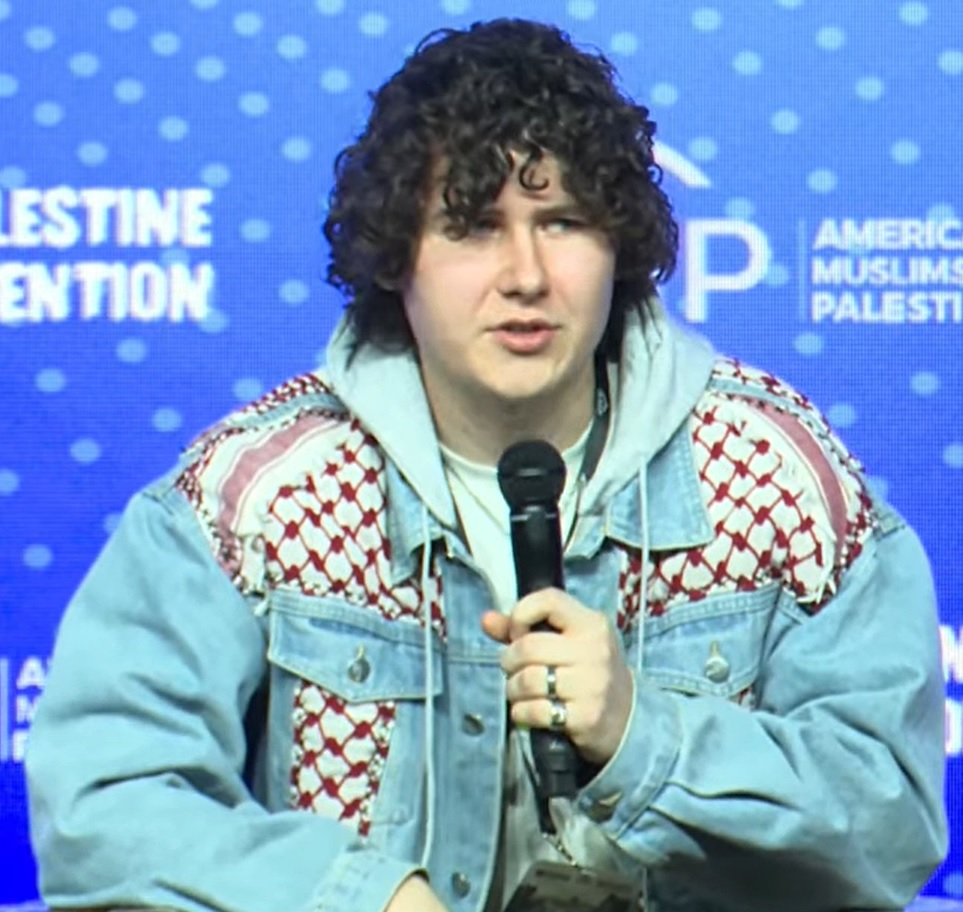
- Christensen in 2026
- Born: 2005 or 2006 (age 19–20); United States
- Other name: YourFavoriteGuy
- Citizenship: United States
- Education: Ohio State University (expelled)
- Occupations: Political commentator; influencer; activist
- Years active: 2021–present
- Known for: Political commentary; Activism related to the Israeli–Palestinian conflict
- Movement: Palestinian nationalism; Marxism

TikTok information
- Page: yourfavoriteguy
- Genres: Political commentary; reaction; current events
- Followers: 3.6 million

YouTube information
- Channel: yourfavoriteguy0
- Subscribers: 74.7k
- Views: 13.3 million
- Last updated: July 14, 2026
- Website: yourfavoriteguy.com

Guy Christensen (born 2005 or 2006), known online as YourFavoriteGuy, is an American left-wing political commentator, influencer, and activist. He is best known for his political commentary on TikTok and advocacy for Palestinian nationalism and Anti-Zionism. After making controversial remarks about the 2025 Capital Jewish Museum shooting, he was expelled from Ohio State University, which was subject to a legal case in which the university was found to have likely violated his constitutional rights.

== Activism ==
Christensen is from Pittsburgh, Pennsylvania. Christensen has been vocally pro-Palestinian since he was in high school. In November 2023, he penned an essay questioning Israel's treatment of Palestinians and its Arab citizens. Christensen has gained attention surrounding his commentary on the Israeli–Palestinian conflict following the October 7 attacks. He was one of many US students who spoke against the Gaza war, and had more than 3 million followers on TikTok as of September 2025.

After the 2025 Capital Jewish Museum shooting, Christensen read the manifesto of suspect Elias Rodriguez and urged his followers to support Rodriguez's actions." Christensen denied an antisemitic motive, asserting that the victims were targeted not for their ethnicity, but for their roles as Israeli government officials. Critics construed his videos as antisemitic and claimed that he incited violence against Jews. The videos eventually caught the attention of United States Congressman Ritchie Torres, who is known to be among the staunchest allies of Israel within the Democratic Party. Torres urged the federal government to investigate Christensen as a possible threat and extremist, which led to Christensen calling Torres a "Zionist scumbag" and "AIPAC millionaire." In late 2025, Christensen was nominated by the pro-Israel group StopAntisemitism for its "Antisemite of the Year" list.

In February 2026, Christensen's YouTube channel was suspended. The suspension was later reverted following a social media backlash. Christensen said, "YouTube was forced to restore my entire channel + monetisation after REJECTING the appeal last night, promising I would stay banned forever. This is the power of collective action and solidarity. If we don't stand together, we'll be picked apart 1 by 1."

=== Ohio State University expulsion and lawsuit ===
Christensen's social media posts eventually led to his expulsion from Ohio State University, where Christensen was attending university as a freshman. Initially, OSU suspended him and told Christensen that they would arrange a meeting with him to get his side of the story. Christensen says he did schedule a meeting with the university but that he was expelled before he could speak to speak to any university staff. OSU emphasized that the expulsion had nothing to do with Christensen's actions, but was instead a response to escalating public criticism. The university cited three instigating factors: Congressman Ritchie Torres's characterization of Christensen's videos as a threat, numerous communications reportedly from the university community expressing fear for their safety, and the engagement of unspecified law enforcement jurisdictions.

Christensen filed a complaint for "Declaratory and Injunctive Relief" against OSU president Walter Carter, Senior Vice President for Student Life Melissa Shivers, and Registrar Ryan Hunt in the United States District Court for the Southern District of Ohio on September 17, 2025. The ACLU of Ohio took up Christensen's case against the university, arguing that Christensen's social media posts were not incitement to violence but free speech. The ACLU also emphasized that Christensen was a passionate critic of Zionism prior to starting university and that he never sought to link his social media pages to OSU. The ACLU argued that Christensen was unfairly punished for posts made on his free time outside of the school.

The ACLU has also said that Christensen has been the victim of a social media doxing campaign spurred on by accounts such as End Jew Hatred, which encouraged its followers to write letters to OSU asking for Christensen's expulsion from the school.

On January 14, 2026, U.S. District Judge Edmund A. Sargus Jr, issued a 30-page ruling ordering Ohio State University to immediately reverse the expulsion of Guy Christensen from its records, concluding that the university likely violated his constitutional rights (First and Fourteenth Amendments). Christensen has stated he does not wish to re-enroll in the university after his poor treatment. A spokesman for the university has expressed their dismay in the ruling.

While some critics of Christensen have deemed his social media posts "loathsome", Sargus emphasized that even loathsome speech is protected under the First Amendment.

== Political beliefs ==
The Jewish Telegraphic Agency has characterized Christensen as far-left.

In an opinion piece for TRT World, he wrote, "I was shocked to learn of Israel’s illegal settlements in the occupied West Bank, their violence against Palestinians, the resulting displaced families, and bulldozed homes, and it struck a chord. It was reminiscent of the colonisation of Native Americans by English settlers."

Christensen also stated that Elias Rodriguez, the individual accused of killing two Israeli embassy employees outside the DC Jewish Museum, should be considered a resistance fighter rather than a terrorist, after having initially denounced Rodriguez. He said in his initial denunciation of the shooting that it would lead to a crackdown on pro-Palestinian activists in the U.S., which he compared to Kristallnacht. Christensen has also worn clothing on camera inferring that Jesus was Palestinian.

In January 2025, Christensen criticized a proposed ban of TikTok in the US, saying it would "eliminate the most impactful online space that the pro-Palestinian movement has in the world... The biggest concern about this ban is that the pro-Israel lobby and Zionists who pushed for the app to be taken away from Americans will have succeeded in permanently and irrevocably altering the public discourse in America to fit their interest". Since TikTok's acquisition by American entrepreneur Larry Ellison in January 2026, Christensen has encouraged his audience to abandon TikTok and move to UpScrolled, which has been perceived as having a more pro-Palestinian stance.

In September 2026, Christensen criticized New York City mayor Zohran Mamdani, stating, "Zohran has exposed his Zionism in full the past week". Christensen denounced Mamdani for not arresting Israeli prime minister Benjamin Netanyahu when he visited New York, meeting with investor Alex Soros, and "launch[ing] 'the first municipal effort to combat antisemitism' that relies on 50% Zionist pro-Israel sources". In October 2026, Christensen's account on TikTok was taken down for unknown reasons.

== See also ==
- Freedom of speech in the United States
