= All Your Perfects =

2018 novel by Colleen Hoover

- First edition
- Author: Colleen Hoover
- Language: English
- Genre: Romance
- Publisher: Atria Books
- Publication date: 17 July 2018
- Publication place: United States
- ISBN: 9781501193323
- OCLC: 1090452900

All Your Perfects is a 2018 romance novel written by Colleen Hoover that follows the story of the couple Graham and Quinn. It is Colleen Hoover's 16th book and can be read as a standalone.

== Plot ==
The book depicts the first meeting between Graham and Quinn in the past, as well as their lives together in the present. In the book, Quinn struggles with infertility.

== Reception ==
Upon its release, the novel was included on The New York Times Best Seller list and the USA Today's Best Selling Books list. A review from Kirkus stated that "this depiction of a marriage in crisis is nearly perfect." Hoover described it as "probably the saddest book I’ve ever written."
