= Died Suddenly =

2022 anti-vaccination propaganda film

- Film poster
- Directed by: Matthew Skow
- Produced by: Lauren Witzke; Edward Szall; Matthew Skow; Nicholas Stumphauzer
- Release date: November 21, 2022
- Running time: 69 minutes
- Country: United States
- Language: English

Died Suddenly is a 2022 American anti-vaccination film directed by Matthew Skow and executive-produced by Stew Peters, a far-right and alt-right anti-vaccine activist. It promotes false claims about COVID-19 vaccines and Great Reset conspiracy theories. The film was released on Rumble and Twitter on November 21, 2022.

On May 30, 2023, Peters released a related film, Final Days, on Twitter.

== Background ==
In late 2021, videos spread on Facebook and Instagram that baselessly claimed 62% of those who receive the mRNA vaccine develop blood clots, and that Pfizer's vaccine creates clots "in a minute or two". The claim originates from Dr. Charles Hoffe, who has made other false claims about COVID-19 vaccines, such as claiming that they are "clearly more dangerous" than the disease itself. While studies have found possible causal links between the AstraZeneca and Janssen COVID-19 vaccines and a rare clotting disorder known as thrombosis with thrombocytopenia syndrome (TTS), there were only 47 confirmed cases out of 15 million participants as of October 2021.

Stew Peters is an American far-right media personality who is known for promoting COVID-19 misinformation and conspiracy theories. He has referred to the vaccine as a "bio-weapon", claimed that the COVID-19 vaccines are responsible for the deaths of people, and has called for "the people in our government responsible" to be "put on trial and executed". He has been banned from Spotify for his disproven claims. Peters has previously produced the anti-vaccine film Watch the Water, which purports that COVID-19 vaccines are derived from snake venom in order to transform people into "a hybrid of Satan".

== Narrative ==
The main narrative of the film is that the COVID-19 vaccines have supposedly caused otherwise healthy individuals to "die suddenly" en masse from excessive blood clotting caused by the spike protein produced by the mRNA vaccine, as well as an increase of miscarriages and Bell's Palsy. The film includes testimony from embalmers and funeral directors, who discuss the presence of "unusual" blood clots in the dead bodies of people they say had been vaccinated. Experts quoted by Agence France-Presse (AFP) previously explained that clots could be caused by anything, such as obesity, smoking and being infected with COVID-19, as well as the bodies being refrigerated. It also features interviews with individuals known for promoting misinformation about COVID-19 vaccines, such as entrepreneur Steve Kirsch.

The film references conspiracy theories about the World Economic Forum and the Great Reset, suggesting that a 2019 pandemic preparedness exercise was proof that the COVID-19 pandemic was orchestrated by "nefarious global elites". It also promotes claims that Bill Gates is planning to kill off up to 15% of the world's population using vaccines, the evidence for which is a misrepresented video clip of Gates at a TED Talk in 2010 where he states that providing better healthcare to poor countries could slow population growth. The film also includes a graph showing stillbirths increasing in 2021, relying on the correlation is causation fallacy and falsified data to claim that COVID-19 vaccines caused an increase in miscarriages. The film also falsely claims that adverse events reported by Pfizer from sources such as the Yellow Card system in the UK and the Vaccine Adverse Event Reporting System (VAERS) in the US prove that the COVID-19 vaccine is harmful for human health.

== Promotion ==
A two-minute trailer was released on Twitter on October 5, 2022 by a dedicated account for the film, which was created the same day. The trailer went viral on social media. Lead Stories fact-checked the trailer, and found that it relied on out-of-context screenshots and clips that did not demonstrate a link between the COVID-19 vaccines and sudden death.

== Release ==
The film was released on Rumble and Twitter on November 21, 2022. Within hours of the film's premiere, it went viral on social media, garnering over 7 million views and over 30,000 retweets within a day. It was shared by individuals such as former U.S. congressional candidate DeAnna Lorraine, websites such as LifeSiteNews, and conspiracy groups. By November 23, it had been viewed over 4 million times on Rumble and 1.5 million times on Twitter. By January 2023, it had been viewed almost 20 million times. It was promoted by Marjorie Taylor Greene and Candace Owens.

In November 2022, the BBC reported that bereaved families had been subjected to online harassment due to the film's release, after social media users falsely connected the sudden deaths of people to mRNA vaccines.

== Reception ==
Jonathan Jarry of the University of McGill wrote that what the film does is "akin to grave-robbing", adding: "It raids online obituaries, with complete disregard for consent or basic journalistic integrity, and stitches a pseudoscientific horror story with the faces of the deceased." David Gorski of Science-Based Medicine referred to the film as a "pseudodocumentary" and a "propaganda film", panning it for its misrepresentation of postmortem blood clotting, extensive use of shock imagery to scare the viewer, and for "[resurrecting] the old antivax conspiracy that vaccines kill". Virologist Angela Rasmussen of the University of Saskatchewan described the film as anti-vaccine propaganda and "A couple hours of grifters telling lies so you'll give them money. Even half of the people who supposedly 'died suddenly' didn't die!"

The film has received criticism from some members of the anti-vaccine movement, who said that the film was so poorly-researched that it had to be controlled opposition intended to discredit the movement.

== Lawsuit ==
In April 2024, Peters sued the film's producers, including conspiracy theorist Lauren Witzke, for allegedly acting as its owners, falsely advertising a sequel and collecting donations on his behalf. Witzke, Edward Szall, Matthew Skow, and Nicholas Stumphauzer were identified as the defendants.

== See also ==
- New World Order conspiracy theory
- Plandemic, a 2020–2023 trilogy of conspiratorial films that claim the COVID-19 pandemic was manufactured to control and profit off the population.
- Vaxxed: From Cover-Up to Catastrophe, a 2016 American pseudoscience propaganda film alleging a cover-up by the Centers for Disease Control and Prevention (CDC) of a purported link between the MMR vaccine and autism.
