= Tarryn Fisher =

South African-born novelist

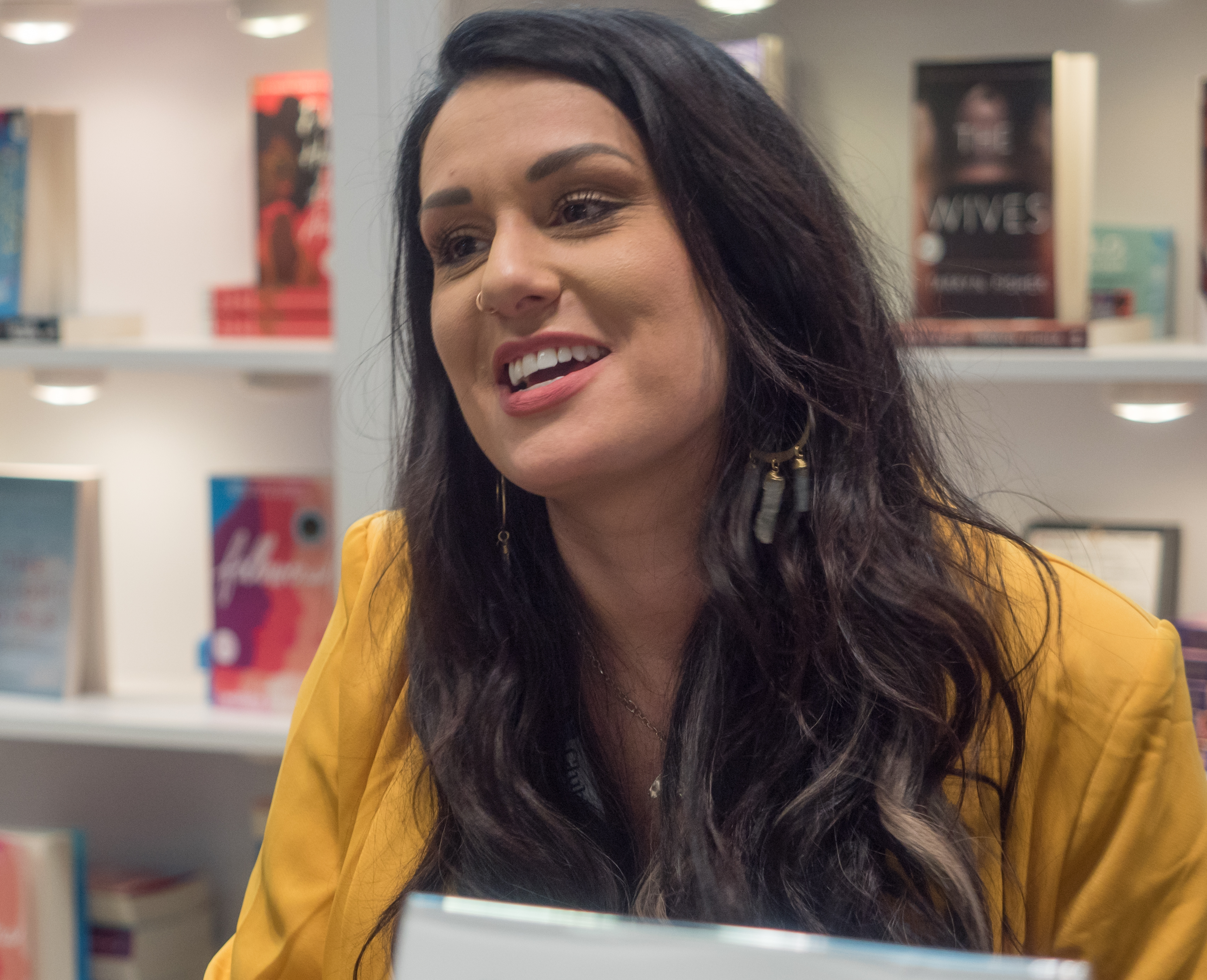
- Born: c. April 1983; Johannesburg, South Africa
- Occupation: Novelist
- Notable work: The Wives; The Wrong Family

Tarryn Fisher (born 1983) is a South African-born novelist based in Seattle, Washington, United States. She writes primarily in the romance, thriller, and new adult genres, and is best known for her New York Times best selling novels The Wives and The Wrong Family.

== Early life and career ==
Tarryn Fisher was born in Johannesburg, South Africa, to a White South African family. Her father, Dennis Fisher, was a horse trainer and his wife, Cynthia Fisher, was a schoolteacher. The family left South Africa and moved to Broward County, Florida in 1985 when Fisher was 3 years old. She currently resides in Seattle, Washington, with her husband and children.

Fisher self-published her first novel, The Opportunist, through Amazon. Fisher's two most recent novels The Wives and The Wrong Family, were published by Harlequin Enterprises, a division of HarperCollins. Both titles made appearances on the New York Times Best Seller list. In a 2019 review of The Wives, Kirkus Reviews described the novel as "all a bit over the top, but Fisher is a slick writer who keeps a tight rein on her lightning-fast plot."

== Bibliography ==
- Fisher, Tarryn (14 November 2011). The Opportunist (Love Me With Lies Book 1). CreateSpace Independent Publishing Platform. ISBN 9781469982786.
- Fisher, Tarryn (21 December 2012). Dirty Red (Love Me With Lies Book 2). CreateSpace Independent Publishing Platform. ISBN 9781723142758.
- Fisher, Tarryn (21 July 2013). Thief (Love Me With Lies Book 3). ISBN 9781723143038.
- Fisher, Tarryn (8 March 2014). Mud Vein. ISBN 9781497455047.
- Fisher, Tarryn; Hoover, Colleen (2015). Never Never. Colleen Hoover/Smashwords Edition. ISBN 9781310382727.
- Fisher, Tarryn (17 April 2015). Marrow. CreateSpace Independent Publishing Platform. ISBN 9781511682763.
- Fisher, Tarryn (14 January 2016). F*ck Love. CreateSpace Independent Publishing Platform. ISBN 9781522778158.
- Fisher, Tarryn (12 January 2017). Bad Mommy. CreateSpace Independent Publishing Platform. ISBN 9781541221437.
- Fisher, Tarryn (14 July 2017). Atheists Who Kneel and Pray. ISBN 9781548739478.
- Fisher, Tarryn; Aster, Willow (18 May 2018). Folsom. ISBN 9781719341127.
- Fisher, Tarryn; Aster, Willow (26 June 2018). Jackal. ISBN 9781721620869.
- Fisher, Tarryn (16 May 2019). F*ck Marriage. ISBN 9781097105397.
- Fisher, Tarryn (1 January 2020). The Wives. HQ Fiction. ISBN 9781489293107.
- Fisher, Tarryn (1 January 2021). The Wrong Family. ISBN 9781867209904.
- Fisher, Tarryn (2022). An Honest Lie. Toronto, Ontario, Canada: Graydon House. ISBN 978-1-5258-1157-9.
