= Confess (TV series) =

American drama television series

- Genre: Drama; Romance
- Created by: Lisa Berger
- Based on: Confess by Colleen Hoover
- Written by: Elissa Down
- Directed by: Elissa Down
- Starring: Katie Leclerc; Ryan Cooper
- Country of origin: United States
- Original language: English
- No. of seasons: 1
- No. of episodes: 7

Production
- Executive producers: Jaime Burke; Don Dunn; Amy S. Kim; Lisa Berger; Brett Bouttier; Colleen Hoover; Lauren Levine; Brian Robbins
- Camera setup: Single-camera
- Running time: 23 minutes
- Production companies: Awestruck; Lifeboat Productions

Original release
- Network: Go90
- Release: April 7, 2017

Confess is an American drama television series based on the 2015 novel by Colleen Hoover, that premiered on Go90 on April 7, 2017. Directed and written by Elissa Down, the series' seven-episode first season stars Katie Leclerc and Ryan Cooper and tells the story of a young woman with a difficult past who falls in love with a man who is keeping a secret from her.
