= Great Reset =

Post-COVID-19 pandemic initiative by the World Economic Forum

The Great Reset, also known as the Great Reset Initiative, is an economic recovery plan that was proposed by the World Economic Forum (WEF) in response to the COVID-19 pandemic. The project was launched in June 2020. Its stated objective is to support global recovery from the pandemic in a manner that emphasizes sustainable development.

At the time of the initiative's announcement, WEF chairman Klaus Schwab outlined three core components of the initiative: advancing a "stakeholder economy" prioritizing "fairer outcomes"; building a more "resilient, equitable, and sustainable" economy using environmental, social, and governance (ESG) metrics; and "harnessing the innovations of the Fourth Industrial Revolution." "The Great Reset" was chosen as the theme for the WEF's 2021 annual meeting in Davos, Switzerland, a summit that was postponed multiple times and ultimately cancelled due to the pandemic.

The Great Reset, and the WEF broadly, have been criticized by scholars and commentators for encouraging economic deregulation and expanding the influence of private corporations, particularly multinational corporations, in policymaking at the expense of governmental authority. Others have argued that the project regards health outcomes as a singularly important social macro trend and exaggerates the ability of a small group of decision-makers to reshape the global economy, or that it amounts to crony capitalism.

The initiative became the focus of conspiracy theories circulated mainly by conservative commentators on social media platforms such as YouTube, Facebook, and Twitter. Conspiratorial claims included that the pandemic had been engineered by a secret group to control the global economy, that lockdowns were intentionally designed to cause economic collapse, or that a global elite sought to abolish private property while using vaccines to subjugate populations. Such theories gained traction when political leaders, including U.S. President Joe Biden, New Zealand Prime Minister Jacinda Ardern, and Canadian Prime Minister Justin Trudeau, referred to the idea of a post-pandemic "reset" in public statements.

== Background and launch ==
In April 2020, amid the COVID-19 pandemic and consequent recession, along with the 2020 Russia–Saudi Arabia oil price war, then Governor of the Bank of England Mark Carney described possible fundamental changes to the global economy in The Economist. Carney said that in a post-COVID world, "stakeholder capitalism" would be tested as "companies will be judged by 'what they did during the war', how they treated their employees, suppliers and customers, by who shared and who hoarded." Carney argued that the "gulf between what markets value and what people value" would close. Carney further suggested that a "new hierarchy of values will call for a reset on the way we deal with climate change, which, like the pandemic, is a global phenomenon." In his 2020 BBC Reith Lectures, Carney developed the theme of value hierarchies as related to three crises—credit, COVID, and climate change.

In May 2020, the WEF published a series of articles arguing that the pandemic offered an opportunity to "reset and reshape" the world in a way more aligned with the United Nations 2030 Sustainable Development Goals (SDG), as climate change, inequality, and poverty gained even greater urgency during the pandemic. This included resetting labour markets as the reset would advance work already begun to prepare for the transition to the Fourth Industrial Revolution by up-skilling and re-skilling workers. The WEF also raised the issue of food security, including the "risk of disruptions to food supply chains", and the need for "global policy coordination" to prevent "food protectionism from becoming the post-pandemic new normal".

The Great Reset took centre stage at the June 2020 virtual WEF forum. In a keynote address opening the forum, International Monetary Fund (IMF) managing director Kristalina Georgieva said that there had been a "massive injection of fiscal stimulus to help countries deal with this crisis" and that it was of "paramount importance that this growth should lead to a greener, smarter, fairer world in the future". Georgieva listed three aspects of the Great Reset: green growth, smarter growth, and fairer growth. Georgieva argued that government investments and incentives for private investors could "support low-carbon and climate-resilient growth" and that low oil prices made the timing right to eliminate fossil fuel subsidies and introduce carbon pricing to incentivize future investments. The COVID-19 pandemic thus presented an opportunity to shape an economic recovery and the future direction of global relations, economies, and priorities.

In remarks to the forum, WEF founder and chairman Klaus Schwab described three core components of the Great Reset, which was meant to promote "responsible capitalism". The first was creating conditions for a "stakeholder economy" by improving policies and agreements on taxes, regulations, fiscal policies, and trade to result in "fairer outcomes". The second addressed how large-scale pandemic spending programs with private investments and pension funds could improve on the existing economic system by building one that is more "resilient, equitable and sustainable" over the long term by "building green urban infrastructure and creating incentives for industries to improve their track record on environmental, social and governance (ESG) metrics". The third highlighted component was "harness[ing] the innovations of the Fourth Industrial Revolution" for the public good. A July 2020 non-fiction book by Schwab and economist Thierry Malleret developed the plan in more detail. The core components of the plan quickly received attention from other institutions, such as the American Brookings Institution.

Then Prince of Wales, Charles III, also participated in the launch of the Great Reset through the Sustainable Markets Initiative. Charles argued that global economic recovery must put the world on a path to sustainability, and suggested that the private sector would be the main driver of the plan.

Also in June 2020, the WEF launched a series of "Great Reset Dialogues" featuring public figures in discussions on how to rebuild the "social contract" in a post-COVID world. The Great Reset was scheduled to be the theme of the 2021 WEF summit, but this was postponed repeatedly and ultimately cancelled due to the pandemic.

=== Fourth Industrial Revolution ===
Klaus Schwab promoted the concept of a "Fourth Industrial Revolution" in a 2015 article published by Foreign Affairs, and the concept was the theme for the 2016 WEF annual meeting. In the 2015 article, Schwab outlined various industrial revolutions. Schwab wrote that the first Industrial Revolution was powered by "water and steam" to "mechanize production". Through electrical power, the second industrial revolution introduced mass production. Electronics and information technologies automated the production process in the third industrial revolution. In the fourth industrial revolution, which began with the digital revolution in the mid-1990s, the lines between "physical, digital, and biological spheres" had become blurred, "characterized by a fusion of technologies". This fusion of technologies included "fields such as artificial intelligence, robotics, the Internet of Things, autonomous vehicles, 3D printing, nanotechnology, biotechnology, materials science, energy storage, and quantum computing."

A 21 October 2020 WEF virtual panel discussed how organizations could harness fourth revolution technologies. On 28 January 2021, the Davos Agenda virtual panel discussed how artificial intelligence (AI) will "fundamentally change the world," highlighting that 63% of CEOs believe that "AI will have a larger impact than the Internet."

The Great Reset Dialogues resulted in the launch of multi-year projects, including the digital transformation programme, where cross-industry stakeholders investigated how the 2020 "dislocative shock" had increased and "accelerated digital transformations". A July 2020 report from the project highlighted gaps between the uptake in new technologies and existing digital skills, stating that, while "digital ecosystems will represent more than $60 trillion in revenue by 2025... only 9% of executives [in July 2020] say their leaders have the right digital skills".

== Endorsements ==
Political leaders such as Canadian Prime Minister Justin Trudeau, U.S. President Joe Biden, New Zealand Prime Minister Jacinda Ardern, and UK Prime Minister Boris Johnson endorsed the idea of "building back better" from the pandemic.

=== Canada ===
In an 11 June 2020 meeting with the Prince of Wales and permanent representatives to the United Nations from the Commonwealth of Nations, Canadian Prime Minister Justin Trudeau spoke regarding the Great Reset. Trudeau said that the Commonwealth provided a space for "dialogue and collective action on global issues related to sustainable development" which included how to "build back stronger, more resilient, and greener economies" in a post-COVID-19 world. This followed similar statements made on 28 May, when Trudeau and Jamaica's Prime Minister Andrew Holness convened an online meeting of "world leaders and international organizations" to consult on a "global response to the significant economic and human impacts of COVID-19, and advance concrete solutions to the development emergency". In a 29 September 2020 six-minute virtual address to the UN General Assembly, Trudeau described how "building back better" included supporting the most vulnerable, for example by ensuring "equitable access" to the COVID-19 vaccine in developing countries, while also working towards reaching the UN's Sustainable Development Goals for 2030.

In his August presentation at the 2020 Victoria Forum entitled "The Great Reset", the Governor of the Bank of Canada described how COVID-19 was resulting in a "structural shock with broad impact worldwide". The governor said that governments, investors in the corporate and financial sector, including central banks, and individual households needed to evaluate risks and prepare for transitions. He recommended the use of scenario analysis as a way of describing possible and plausible outcomes in the face of a "high degree of uncertainty" in regard to climate change, policy, "technological development", and "evolving consumer and investor preferences".

=== Netherlands ===
In December 2021, the Dutch government published its past correspondence with representatives of the WEF, with some of the documents calling for the Netherlands to take the lead in implementing the Great Reset.

=== New Zealand ===
In January 2019, at a WEF "Safeguarding Our Planet" panel discussion alongside world leaders and broadcaster Sir David Attenborough, New Zealand Prime Minister Jacinda Ardern discussed her government's "Wellbeing Budget" and planned environmental changes. These initiatives were later linked to the Great Reset in news articles. In April 2020, New Zealand Finance Minister Grant Robertson discussed a well-being-focused post-COVID "Recovery Budget" and an opportunity for an economic reset. Other initiatives promoted by Ardern and Robertson included an artificial intelligence drive in New Zealand related to the WEF "Globalization 4.0" initiatives to shape a global architecture in the "Age of the Fourth Industrial Revolution".

=== United States ===
President-elect Joe Biden announced in November 2020 that John Kerry, who had participated in the Great Reset Dialogues on how to rebuild the "social contract" in a post-COVID world, would be appointed U.S. Special Presidential Envoy for Climate. Kerry said that COVID-19 offered a "big moment" that opened the possibility for the Great Reset and that the WEF would play a significant role in refining how to respond to climate change and inequalities that were "laid bare as a consequence of COVID-19." A 23 January 2021 Financial Times article said that policymakers around the world were anticipating President Biden's "reset on trade, tax and climate".

== Reception ==
=== Commentary and criticism ===
Well before 2020, critics argued that the WEF was working to effectively undermine global democracy. For example, according to a 2016 Transnational Institute (TNI) brief, the WEF was working to replace a recognized democratic model with a model where a self-selected group of "stakeholders" makes decisions on behalf of the broader public. The think tank argued that gatherings such as Davos served as "a silent global coup d'état" to capture governance.

In a December 2020 article in The Intercept, Naomi Klein described the Great Rest idea as a "Great Reset Conspiracy Smoothie." She said that it was simply a "coronavirus-themed rebranding" of things that the WEF was already promoting and that it was an attempt by the rich to improve their image. Klein highlighted that Klaus Schwab had given each meeting at Davos a theme since 2003, arguing that "The Great Reset is merely the latest edition of this gilded tradition, barely distinguishable from earlier Davos Big Ideas."

In a review of the 2020 Great Reset book co-authored by Schwab and Thierry Malleret—and of the Great Reset agenda in general—Ben Sixsmith wrote in The Spectator that the Great Reset was a set of "bad ideas...adopted internationally by some of the richest and most powerful people in the world". Sixsmith described sections of the book as "earnest" but concluded that "The Great Reset might be all the more terrifying for not being a sinister plot."

In a review of the book in the Journal of Value Inquiry, ethicist Steven Umbrello made parallel critiques of the agenda. Umbrello wrote that the agenda amounts to nothing other than "a substantial (if not complete) socio-political-economic overhaul" and that such a proposal is a "false dilemma" as "Schwab and Malleret whitewash a seemingly optimistic future post-Great Reset with buzz words like equity and sustainability even as they functionally jeopardize those admirable goals".

=== Conspiracy theories ===
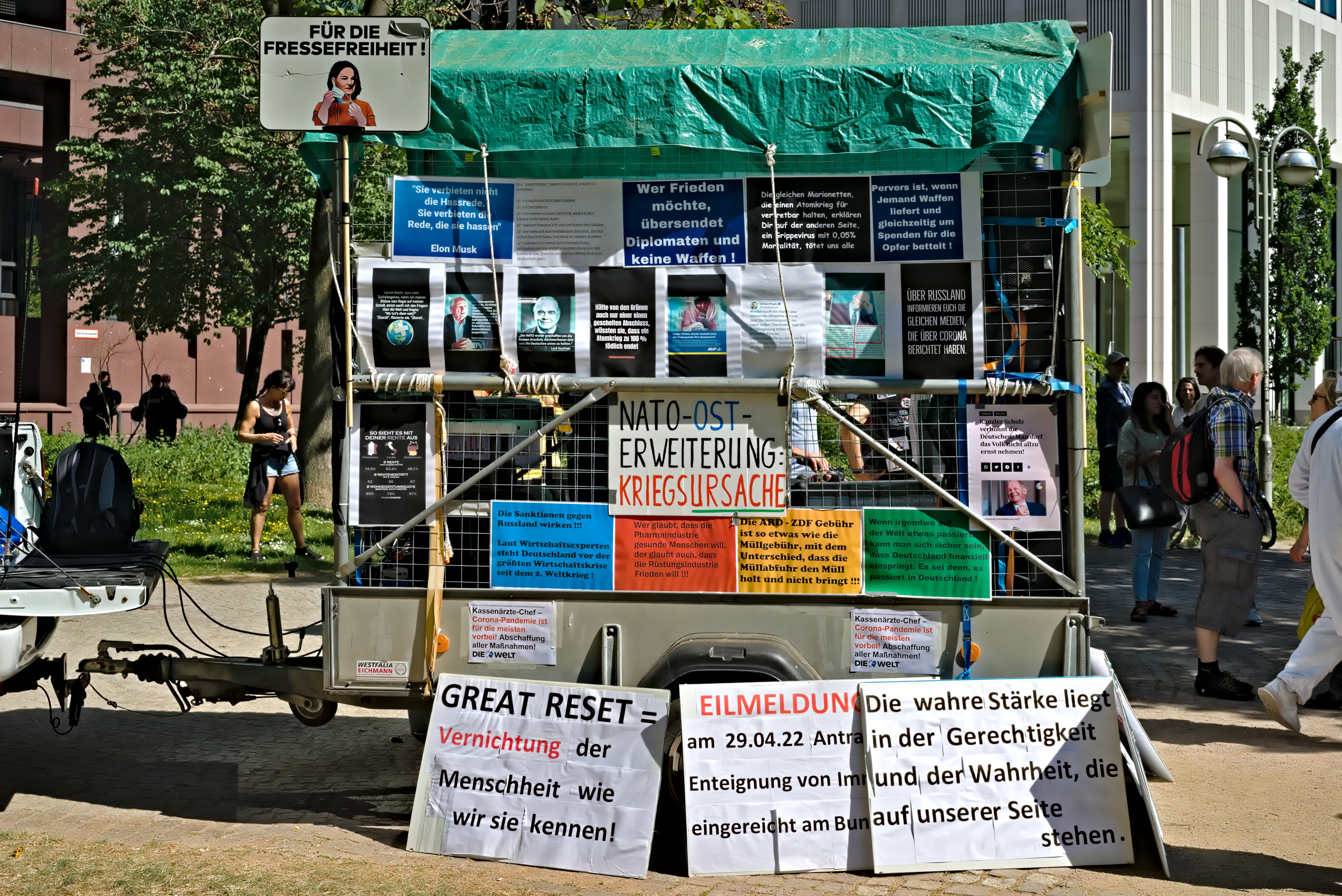
Placards protesting about COVID-19 responses and the "Great Reset" in Frankfurt, Germany, 2022

The Great Reset quickly became central to conspiracy theories, some of which have been promoted even by politicians. Such theories include claims that the COVID-19 pandemic was created by a secret group in order to seize control of the global economy, that public health restrictions were deliberately designed to induce economic meltdown, or that a global elite was attempting to abolish private property while using COVID-19 to enslave humanity with vaccines.

A November 2020 article in The Daily Beast highlighted that even before becoming president, Joe Biden's "incoming White House already had its first conspiracy theory to deal with" in the Great Reset. For instance, the Heartland Institute's editorial director expressed concerns that Biden would "bring the Great Reset to the United States" and that "the country [would] never be the same." Mainstream media outlets such as The New York Times, the BBC, and The Guardian traced the spread of the conspiracy theory to internet personalities and groups including Candace Owens, Glenn Beck, Fox News hosts Laura Ingraham, Sean Hannity, and Tucker Carlson, and Paul Joseph Watson, the UK-based editor of Alex Jones' website Infowars. Ben Sixsmith wrote that the conspiracy theory had been spread by "fringes of Right-Wing Twitter" as well as by Australia's One Nation party leader Pauline Hanson and UK conservative writer James Delingpole. In December 2020, Australian advertising executive Rowan Dean promoted the conspiracy theory on Sky News Australia, claiming that the "Great Reset is as serious and dangerous a threat to our prosperity—to your prosperity and your freedom—as we have faced in decades".

The conspiracy theory has been disseminated by Russian propaganda outlets. According to Oliver Kamm in a 2020 article for the CapX website, "The propaganda apparatus of the Putin regime has for many months published wild allegations from obscure bloggers that the Great Reset is code for oligarchs to amass wealth and control populations." In 2021, the British anti-disinformation organization Logically reported that the website The Exposé had promoted Great Reset conspiracy theories framed as breaking news since its establishment in November 2020.

Great Reset conspiracy theories were a theme in the 2022 anti-vaccine film Died Suddenly, which appeared on the Stew Peters Network channel on the Rumble website.

==== "You'll own nothing" ====
Conspiracy theorists have commonly cited Ida Auken in their discussions. Ahead of the 2016 WEF meeting of the Global Future Councils, Auken, a Danish MP who was also a member of the Council on Cities and Urbanization, wrote an article that was published by the WEF and later republished by Forbes in which she imagined how technology could improve people's lives by 2030 if the UN sustainable development goals were realized through the fusion of technologies promoted by Klaus Schwab. In the scenario presented by Auken, the emergence and application of new digitized technologies to sectors such as communication, energy, transportation, and accommodation would result in greater access and decreased cost, eventually leading to the end of "lifestyle diseases, climate change, the refugee crisis, environmental degradation, completely congested cities, water pollution, air pollution, social unrest and unemployment". By the scenario's 2030 endpoint, anything that had once been a product would be a freely available service, obviating the need for personal ownership of goods or real estate. The article, originally titled "Welcome to 2030. I own nothing, have no privacy, and life has never been better", was criticized for portraying an unrealistic utopia at the cost of privacy. In response, Auken added an author's note in which she said that the article merely represented a potential future scenario and that it was intended to "start a discussion about some of the pros and cons of the current technological development" in a way that she claimed conventional reports could not, while the article itself was renamed to "Here's how life could change in my city by the year 2030". Both versions of the article describe the loss of privacy as undesirable. Despite such clarifications, "You'll own nothing and be happy" became a catchphrase among conspiracy theorists.

==== Canada ====
An October 2020 article by Snopes debunked a chain email allegedly leaked by a member of the Canadian government and purporting to unveil the government's secret "COVID Global Reset Plan". Snopes traced the origins of the email, which was posted to the QAnon "Q Research" board on 8chan, to a member of a non-existent government committee to the QAnon-dedicated "Q Research" board on 8chan. Ezra Levant's Rebel News outlet emerged as a major promoter of such conspiracy theories in Canada.

By 17 November 2020, a video of Justin Trudeau's speech in which he described key points of the concept of an economic "reset" had gone viral. Maxime Bernier, leader of the People's Party of Canada, stated on his webpage on 17 November that he was the only Canadian politician, along with Pierre Poilievre and Colin Carrie, speaking against the Great Reset while describing Trudeau as the "world's most prominent defender" of the initiative. Then Leader of the Opposition Erin O'Toole subsequently described alleged government plans as "a massive and risky experiment". When Poilievre circulated a petition to "Stop the Reset", Le Devoir headlined an article saying that the Conservative Party was embracing conspiracy theories. The Toronto Star editorial board criticized Poilievre for "giving oxygen" to the conspiracy theory, with critics suggesting the scheme was related to a possible federal election.

A May 2022 article in The Globe and Mail stated that the "WEF conspiracy theory" was being spread to "Canada's main streets" and highlighted that it featured prominently during that year's Conservative Party leadership race, which ultimately saw Poilievre succeed O'Toole as Opposition leader. In September 2022, CBC News tracked the spread of related disinformation and conspiracy theories in Canada.

== Books ==
Klaus Schwab and Thierry Malleret wrote two books about the Great Reset that were published by WEF's imprint.

No.	Title	ISBN	Published
1	COVID-19: The Great Reset	978-2-940631-12-4	9 July 2020
2	The Great Narrative	978-2-940631-30-8	28 December 2021

== See also ==
- Great Awakening – Christian revivals in American history
- Great Replacement – Conspiracy theory about race and culture
- Great Resignation – 2021–2023 surge in job quits
- Marshall Plan – American initiative for foreign aid to Western Europe following World War II
- Reverse Course – Shift in United States–Japan relations during the Allied occupation
