= Verity (novel) =

2018 psychological thriller novel by Colleen Hoover

- Author: Colleen Hoover
- Audio read by: Vanessa Johansson; Amy Landon
- Language: English
- Genre: Romantic thriller
- Publisher: Grand Central Publishing
- Publication date: December 7, 2018
- Publication place: United States
- Pages: 324
- ISBN: 978-1-791-39279-6
- OCLC: 1080637397

Verity is a 2018 psychological romantic thriller novel by American author Colleen Hoover. The narrative follows Lowen Ashleigh, a writer who is hired to complete a bestselling book series after an accident leaves its original author, Verity Crawford, unable to do so. While staying at the Crawford family home, Lowen discovers an unfinished manuscript that reveals unsettling details about Verity's past.

It was originally self-published on December 7, 2018, and later republished by Grand Central Publishing (an imprint of Hachette Book Group) in 2021 following a surge in popularity. The book represents a departure from Hoover's earlier works, which are primarily contemporary romance. Hoover incorporates elements of suspense and psychological tension, with themes including obsession, deception, and the shifting boundaries between truth and fiction in this novel.

The novel received generally positive reviews and was nominated for a Goodreads Choice Award for Best Romance in 2019 and won the British Book Award for Pageturner in 2023 and the Lovelybooks Leserpreis for Romance in 2020.

== Plot ==
Struggling writer Lowen Ashleigh is still processing the death of her mother, which left her emotionally isolated and responsible for her own financial survival. Eager for any opportunity that could advance her career, she goes to meet with a famous publisher. On her way there, Lowen witnesses a traffic crash which splatters blood onto her clothes. A pedestrian helps a distraught Lowen calm down and gives her his shirt so that she will not have to wear her blood-stained clothes to the meeting. When she arrives, the man who helped her is present. She learns that he is Jeremy Crawford, the husband of bestselling author Verity Crawford. Verity has fallen comatose in the wake of a car crash and is consequently unable to finish her bestselling book series, which Jeremy enlists Lowen to ghostwrite. Lowen agrees, and travels to the Crawfords' home to look through Verity's notes about the series.

Lowen arrives at the remote lake house, where an unconscious Verity resides in the couple's bed. Lowen learns that the couple's daughter Chastin passed away from anaphylactic shock months earlier. Shortly thereafter, while Verity was on a boat ride with Chastin's twin sister Harper and the couple's youngest son Crew, the boat capsized, resulting in Harper drowning while Verity was focused on saving Crew. Unable to cope with losing both of her daughters, Verity attempted suicide by driving her car into a tree, leading to her current condition.

Lowen finds an unpublished autobiography manuscript titled "So Be It", detailing Verity's obsessive love for Jeremy and resentment toward Chastin and Harper, whom she viewed as competition for his affection. The manuscript also contains Verity's admissions of having tried to terminate her pregnancy with the twins and attempting to murder them multiple times in their infancy, and proclamation that she blames Harper for Chastin's death, which ultimately led her to intentionally capsize the boat to cause Harper's drowning. The manuscript ends with Verity stating her intention to kill herself by driving her car into a tree to escape legal consequences for her actions.

Disturbed and overwhelmed by these revelations, Lowen begins to suspect Verity of faking her condition, especially when she hears suspicious noises from Verity's room on numerous occasions. Meanwhile, Lowen also begins to develop an attraction to Jeremy, and eventually begins a romantic affair with him. Lowen sets up a security camera in Verity's room, and witnesses Verity moving her leg slightly. After much contemplation, Lowen informs Jeremy of her findings.

Furious upon discovering that Verity has been feigning her condition, Jeremy attempts to strangle her. Catching this on the camera system, Lowen arrives to stop Jeremy, warning him that he will be indicted for her murder if his handprints are found on her throat. At Lowen's insistence, Jeremy forces Verity to vomit and subsequently covers her mouth and nose until she stops breathing, to make it look like she aspirated in her sleep.

After Verity's death, Lowen and Jeremy profess their love for each other. A while later, Lowen and Jeremy are expecting their first child and revisit the Crawfords' home to clear it out. While there, Lowen discovers a handwritten letter to Jeremy from Verity beneath the floorboards. In it, Verity explains that "So Be It" was a work of fiction written from the perspective of a villain as a means of processing her grief, and asserts that she never harmed her children. The letter also reveals that the car crash was not a suicide attempt, but that Jeremy had been the one to crash the car in an attempt to kill Verity after finding the manuscript. Though Verity miraculously emerged unscathed, she became too afraid to attempt to explain herself to him, and instead resolved to pretend to have brain damage until she could figure out a way to escape with Crew.

Horrified at the revelation that they may have murdered an innocent woman, Lowen destroys the letter before Jeremy can find it. She surmises that the letter could have been another deceitful way for Verity to cover her tracks, and concludes that Verity was a master at manipulating the truth, but continues to wonder which truth Verity had been manipulating.

== Characters ==
=== Lowen Ashleigh ===
Lowen is the novel's protagonist, a struggling writer with financial insecurity and little confidence in her career. After her mother's death, she feels isolated and vulnerable. Her life takes a turn when she is offered the chance to ghostwrite Verity Crawford's bestselling series. As she stays longer in the Crawford home, Lowen becomes emotionally entangled with Jeremy and is drawn deeper into the family's dark secrets.

=== Verity Crawford ===
Verity is a famous author who, after a near-fatal car accident, is left seemingly bedridden and unresponsive. Before this, she shared a seemingly perfect life with her husband Jeremy and their three children Chastin, Harper, and Crew. Her hidden manuscript So Be It reveals violent urges toward her children and an obsessive love for Jeremy, though a handwritten letter to Jeremy insists that the manuscript was merely a writing exercise, leaving her true nature and intentions ambiguous.

=== Jeremy Crawford ===
Jeremy is Verity's husband. With both of his daughters deceased and his wife incapacitated, he struggles to keep his family together while protecting his surviving son, Crew. He eventually develops an attraction to and begins a tryst with Lowen.

=== Crew Crawford ===
Crew is Verity and Jeremy's five-year-old son and their only surviving child following the deaths of his elder sisters.

=== Chastin and Harper Crawford ===
Chastin and Harper are the late eight-year-old twin daughters of Jeremy and Verity. Months prior to the events of the novel, Chastin died at a slumber party due to complications from a severe peanut allergy, and Harper accidentally drowned during a boat ride with Crew and Verity shortly after. Verity's unpublished manuscript, So Be It, details a deep hatred for the girls and reveals that their deaths were an indirect result of her abuse and neglect, but it is left unclear if this is true or not. Harper was autistic, having been diagnosed at the age of three.

== Editions ==
The novel was initially released in Kindle edition on December 7, 2018. Three days later, December 10, 2018, it was released in paperback.

== Film adaptation ==
It was announced in 2020 that Amazon MGM Studios would adapt the novel into a film of the same name, with the screenplay being produced by April Maguire and Will Honley.

In December 2024, Anne Hathaway, Dakota Johnson, and Josh Hartnett joined the cast for the film. It premiered in October 2026.
