= Verity (film) =

2026 film by Michael Showalter

- Theatrical release poster
- Directed by: Michael Showalter
- Screenplay by: Nick Antosca
- Based on: Verity by Colleen Hoover
- Produced by: Nick Antosca; Alex Hedlund; Stacey Sher; Michael Showalter; Jordana Mollusk; Anne Hathaway; Colleen Hoover
- Starring: Anne Hathaway; Dakota Johnson; Josh Hartnett; Ismael Cruz Córdova; Brady Wagner
- Cinematography: Jim Frohna
- Edited by: Jay Cassidy
- Music by: Volker Bertelmann
- Production companies: Amazon MGM Studios; Eat the Cat; Semi-Formal Productions; Shiny Penny; Somewhere Pictures; Heartbones Entertainment
- Distributed by: Amazon MGM Studios (United States and Canada); Sony Pictures Releasing International (international)
- Release dates: September 24, 2026 (Curzon Mayfair); October 2, 2026 (United States)
- Running time: 117 minutes
- Country: United States
- Language: English
- Budget: $40 million
- Box office: $181 million

Verity is a 2026 American erotic psychological thriller film directed by Michael Showalter, written by Nick Antosca, and based on Colleen Hoover's 2018 novel. The film stars Anne Hathaway, Dakota Johnson, and Josh Hartnett.

Verity premiered at the Curzon Mayfair Cinema in London on September 24, 2026, and was released by Amazon MGM Studios in the United States and Canada on October 2, 2026. The film received mixed reviews from critics and has grossed $181 million against a production budget of $40 million.

== Plot ==
Lowen Ashleigh, a published author living in New York City, grieves her mother's death from cancer while struggling to find a wider audience for her work. She is approached by a publisher looking for someone to help finish a popular novel series by Verity Crawford, who is known for writing novels from the perspectives of immoral villains. Verity has been left catatonic after a near-fatal car accident, a fact hidden from the media to prevent fans from thinking the series is over. Verity's husband, Jeremy, is mourning the recent death of their young daughter Harper, who drowned in a canoeing accident. He assures Lowen she will be the best candidate for the job, as Verity has read her work and enjoyed it.

Lowen accepts the job and moves in with Jeremy, Verity, and Harper's twin brother Crew in the family's lakeside Vermont home. Verity's office is in the house, allowing Lowen to immerse herself in her copious notes to help her plan the next novel in the series. Lowen discovers an unfinished manuscript of Verity's autobiography, in which Verity describes her infatuation with Jeremy and eventual resentment toward her children, whom she viewed as competition for his love and attention.

Disgusted and horrified, Lowen abandons the manuscript halfway through reading it. Despite Verity's inability to move or speak, Lowen starts to notice Verity looking at her when no one else can see. However, she is unsure if these experiences are mere hallucinations.

Lowen successfully plans the next novel and prepares to begin writing it. Mutual affection grows between her and Jeremy, and they begin an affair. Jeremy confesses that though Verity never read Lowen's book, he did, and felt a deep connection to her, but lied because he thought the validation would mean more coming from Verity.

Lowen revisits Verity's autobiography, which contains a confession that Verity intentionally capsized the canoe in an attempt to drown her children and thus reclaim Jeremy's devotion. Their son Crew only survived because of his ability to swim. The manuscript ends with a declaration that Verity plans to commit vehicular suicide to escape legal consequences for her actions. Lowen confronts Verity, threatening to expose her to the police and take her family and career for herself.

Lowen asks Crew about Harper's death; he refuses to answer, but implies that Verity speaks to him, despite her supposed catatonia. Lowen confides her findings to Jeremy. He angrily confronts Verity, who fearfully admits to faking her catatonia. He begins to strangle her, but Lowen stops him before suggesting that he suffocate her instead to make her death look like an accident. After he kills her, they dump her body in the lake and convince police that she must have woken up from her catatonia, left the house in confusion, and accidentally drowned.

Seven months later, Lowen has published the next novel in Verity's series and is pregnant with Jeremy's daughter. As they prepare to move out of the house, Lowen discovers a handwritten letter from Verity, addressed to Jeremy in the event that she and Crew left him. The letter promises that the autobiography was merely a writing exercise to help her process her grief; by this account, she never resented her children, Harper's death was truly an accident, and she was not actually suicidal.

The letter also recounts how Jeremy discovered the manuscript. Believing it to be true, he drugged Verity then put her in her car with a brick on the accelerator in an attempt to kill her and make it look like a suicide. She survived, but faked catatonia for fear that he would report her to police or kill her if he thought she was capable of telling anyone what he did. Lowen decides not to tell Jeremy about the letter and continue her new life with Jeremy, Crew and her daughter, no longer sure which of Verity's stories to believe.

== Cast ==
- Anne Hathaway as Verity Crawford, a bestselling author
- Dakota Johnson as Lowen Ashleigh, a writer
- Josh Hartnett as Jeremy Crawford, Verity's husband
- Ismael Cruz Córdova as Corey, Lowen's agent
- Brady Wagner as Crew Crawford, Verity and Jeremy's son
- Irina Dvorovenko as Anna, Verity's nurse
- K. K. Moggie as Amanda, who works for Verity's publisher
- Michael Abbott Jr. as a Vermont police officer

Alex Cooper and Sean Evans appear as themselves, in Verity's fictional appearances on Call Her Daddy and Hot Ones, respectively.

== Production ==
=== Development and casting ===
A film adaptation of Colleen Hoover's 2018 novel Verity was being developed by Nick Antosca, Alex Hedlund, and Eat the Cat. They had hired April Maguire and Will Honley to write the screenplay before November 2020 for the then-named Amazon Studios. In May 2024, Hilary Seitz was hired to rewrite the film's screenplay. After additional draft work from Angela LaManna, Antosca was finalizing the screenplay himself in November 2024 when Michael Showalter had signed on to direct the film and Anne Hathaway agreed to lead the film as Verity Crawford. The next month, Josh Hartnett and Dakota Johnson joined the cast for the film. In February 2025, Ismael Cruz Córdova, Brady Wagner, Irina Dvorovenko, K. K. Moggie, and Michael Abbott Jr. were cast in undisclosed roles.

=== Filming ===
Principal photography began in February 2025, with Hathaway and Hartnett shooting on location in New York City. Johnson began shooting her scenes by the following month. Production concluded in April 2025.

=== Ending ===
An alternate twist ending—the film's initial ending—was shot and included Johnson putting on shades, rolling down the window of the car and making waves with her hand (alluding to the audience that she is the master manipulator) before cutting to Hathaway's sinking body wherein she abruptly opens her eyes, indicating she is alive. However, test audiences were not satisfied by this ending, so it was cut.

== Music ==
Volker Bertelmann composed the score for the film. The soundtrack album was released through Lakeshore Records on October 2, 2026, the same day as the film.

Commercial songs that were featured in the film, but not included in the soundtrack album:

- "Girl Feels Good" – FKA Twigs
- "Close But Not Quite " – Curtis Mayfield
- "Family and Friends" – Oklou
- "Body and Soul" – Benny Goodman
- "Sugar! Honey! Love!" – Kali Uchis
- "Hymne A L'Amour" – Lorenzo Bernardi
- "Få En Gave" – Alle
- "Back to Me" – The Marías

== Release ==
Verity had its world premiere at the Curzon Mayfair Cinema in London on September 24, 2026, and was released in the United States and Canada on October 2, 2026, by Amazon MGM Studios. and by Sony Pictures Releasing International on that same date. It was originally set to be released on May 15, 2026. The film was screened in the Gala section of the 39th Tokyo International Film Festival on October 29, 2026.

== Reception ==
=== Box office ===
As of November 17, 2026, Verity has grossed $76 million in the United States and Canada and $105 million in other territories, for a worldwide total of $181 million.

In the United States and Canada, Verity made $15 million on its first day, including $4.5 million from Thursday night previews. It went on to debut at $32 million, topping the box office. In its second weekend the film made $12 million, dropping 63% and finishing in second behind Other Mommy.

=== Critical response ===
Verity received mixed reviews from critics. On the review aggregator website Rotten Tomatoes, 31% of 191 critics' reviews are positive, with an average rating of 4.9/10. The website's consensus reads: "Possessing all the ingredients for a guilty pleasure, Verity leans more towards guilty than pleasurable due to plot twists that are more deflating than intriguing." Metacritic, which uses a weighted average, assigned the film a score of 44 out of 100, based on 35 critics, indicating "mixed or average" reviews. Audiences polled by CinemaScore gave the film an average grade of "C+" on an A+ to F scale, while 50% of those surveyed by PostTrak said they would definitely recommend the film.

RogerEbert.com's Matt Zoller Seitz gave the film three out of four stars, and wrote, "it’s wickedly playful, and it gives its central performers plenty of chances to show off their technique and build their movie-star personas." Larushka Ivan-Zadeh of Time Out gave the film three out of five stars, praising its combination of erotic thriller elements, dark humor, and deliberately excessive melodrama. Ivan-Zadeh highlighted Johnson's return to the sensual thriller style associated with Fifty Shades of Grey, as well as Showalter's ability to balance the film's darker subject matter with a playful, self-aware tone. She also praised the performances and described the film as a "wild and fun ride", while criticizing its excessive twists and lengthy reveal. Odie Henderson of The Boston Globe gave the film two and a half out of five stars, describing it as a "shockingly watchable" adaptation of Hoover's novel. He praised Hathaway's performance as the manipulative Verity, arguing that her scenes were more compelling than Johnson's, and noted Hartnett's humorous portrayal of Jeremy. Henderson also felt that the film would appeal to fans of the novel, although he criticized its slow pace and lengthy runtime.

Peter Bradshaw of The Guardian gave the film a negative review, praising its premise and opening sequence but arguing that the story gradually loses its effectiveness. Bradshaw noted the film's potentially entertaining combination of erotic mystery, gothic influences, and psychological suspense, but criticized the disappearance of supporting characters, the increasingly implausible plot, and the final act. He argued that the film's narrative ultimately "disintegrates" into an unsatisfying series of plot developments and described its resolution as unconvincing and inadequately ambiguous. Clarisse Loughrey of The Independent criticized the film as a derivative and less entertaining version of The Housemaid, arguing that it closely resembles the earlier thriller while failing to generate the same level of excitement. Loughrey criticized the film's forced chemistry, glossy presentation, and reliance on familiar domestic-thriller conventions, while also arguing that Johnson and Hathaway were not given material strong enough to elevate the adaptation. She ultimately described the film as an example of a potentially compelling thriller being weakened by its execution and lack of originality.
