= America First Political Action Conference =

American political conference

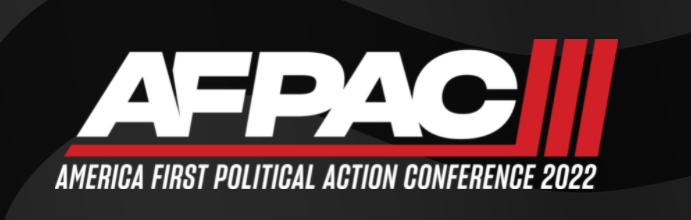
- AFPAC III logo
- Dates: February (dates vary)
- Frequency: Annual
- Locations: Washington, D.C., U.S. (2020); Orange County, Florida, U.S. (2021 and 2022)
- Years active: 2020–2024
- Inaugurated: February 28, 2020; 6 years ago
- Founders: Nick Fuentes
- Most recent: June 16, 2024
- Organizer: America First Foundation
- Website: americafirstfoundation.org

The America First Political Action Conference (AFPAC /ˈæfpæk/ AF-pak) was an annual white nationalist and far-right political conference. Founded in 2020 by political commentator Nick Fuentes, many of its attendees were supporters of his America First show. The conference was described by The Daily Dot as a "white nationalist alternative" to CPAC, the Conservative Political Action Conference. The Arizona Republic characterized it as an extremist rival of CPAC.

The conference hosted four elected officials as speakers: U.S. Congress members Marjorie Taylor Greene and Paul Gosar, Arizona state senator Wendy Rogers, and lieutenant governor of Idaho Janice McGeachin.

== Background ==
On December 21, 2019, in the wake of the "Groyper Wars", leaders of the Groyper movement held a speaking conference called the "Groyper Leadership Summit" in West Palm Beach, Florida. The event was invite-only and held at an undisclosed location. The date, location, and title of the event mirrored Turning Point USA's "Student Action Summit," a speaking event featuring conservatives including Ben Shapiro, who Fuentes would publicly confront outside the venue. In the confrontation, Fuentes said, "Ben, it's great to see you. Why did you give a 45-minute speech about me at Stanford? And you wouldn't even look in my direction." Shapiro did not respond as he walked into the venue. The Daily Beast characterized the Groyper Leadership Summit as "aimed at embarrassing Turning Point, potentially by luring some of the Turning Point students to Fuentes' white nationalist event".

== History ==
AFPAC was founded in 2020 by Nick Fuentes, a white nationalist political commentator.

=== 2020 ===
The inaugural AFPAC was held on February 28, 2020, in Washington, D.C. Speakers included the political commentator Michelle Malkin; former leader of the neo-Nazi group Identity Evropa, Patrick Casey; former Daily Caller editor Scott Greer; and Fuentes. After his appearance at the inaugural AFPAC and immediately following the 2021 United States Capitol attack, Casey cut ties with Fuentes and declared that he would not be returning as a speaker or guest at future conferences.

=== 2021 ===
The second AFPAC was held on February 25, 2021, near Orlando, Florida. While it was open to the public, the organizers were secretive about where the conference would be held; it was later reported that it had been held at the Hilton Orlando. Speakers included Malkin, Vincent James of The Red Elephants radio show, former BlazeTV host and Glenn Beck Program writer Jon Miller, and former Representative Steve King. According to the Orlando Sentinel, the event "was more of a dinner than a multi-day conference". ABC News reported, "speakers spread white nationalist rhetoric, organizers railed about the U.S. losing its 'white demographic core,' and some called for further engagement like the ire that drove the Capitol attack on Jan. 6".

Arizona Representative Paul Gosar appeared as a surprise keynote speaker at the conference; his attendance was the subject of controversy. In his speech, he discussed immigration and what he described as censorship by social media platforms. Gosar skipped voting on a COVID-19 relief bill in order to attend AFPAC. Gosar, appearing on a panel at CPAC several hours after his appearance at AFPAC, stated, "I denounce when we talk about white racism. That's not appropriate."

=== 2022 ===
The third AFPAC was held on February 25, 2022 at the Orlando World Center Marriott near Orlando, Florida. It was sponsored by the social media platform Gab, which resulted in backlash from Gab users due to Fuentes' harsh comments about Gab users. Many of Gab's donors stated that they would stop funding Gab due to this decision; in response to the backlash, Gab CEO Andrew Torba said that "Controversy is attention. Attention is influence" and that "The point of marketing is to influence people to get off Big Tech and get on Gab. In order to do that I need their attention." It was later announced that Torba would be a guest speaker at the AFPAC.

During his speech, Fuentes stated that the media had been comparing Vladimir Putin to Adolf Hitler "and they say that's not a good thing". Fuentes also asked the audience, "Can we get a round of applause for Russia?" which was followed by large applause and chants of "Putin! Putin!".

Former Maricopa County Sheriff Joe Arpaio spoke at the conference and received cheers when he stated, "I have the reputation of being the biggest racist in the country." In response to the applause, Arpaio asked the audience, "What are you clapping for?"

The conference featured four elected officials as speakers: Georgia Representative Marjorie Taylor Greene, Arizona Representative Paul Gosar, Arizona Senator Wendy Rogers, and Lieutenant Governor of Idaho Janice McGeachin. Greene and Gosar were subsequently met with criticism from members of the Republican Party, including from Senate Minority Leader Mitch McConnell and Republican National Committee chairwoman Ronna McDaniel. Greene initially stated to CBS News that she was not aware of Fuentes' views, but later defended her attendance in a statement which read, "It doesn't matter if I'm speaking to Democrat union members or 1,200 young conservatives who feel cast aside and marginalized by society [...] The Pharisees in the Republican Party may attack me for being willing to break barriers and speak to a lost generation of young people who are desperate for love and leadership." Rogers was censured by the Arizona State Senate for calling for political violence during her AFPAC speech.

The conference additionally hosted a variety of far-right media personalities, including Gavin McInnes, Milo Yiannopoulos, and Jesse Lee Peterson, as well as white supremacists Jared Taylor and Peter Brimelow. Fuentes claimed that Yiannopoulos was responsible for connecting him with Rep. Marjorie Taylor Greene.

Kari Lake, a Republican candidate in the 2022 Arizona gubernatorial election, was advertised as a speaker on a flyer for the conference. Lake later denied plans to attend, with Fuentes claiming it was due to a scheduling conflict rather than ideological differences. Thomas Homan, former Director of the U.S. Immigration and Customs Enforcement, confirmed to The Huffington Post that he had been scheduled to speak at AFPAC, but cancelled his appearance on the day of the conference due to Fuentes' support of the 2022 Russian invasion of Ukraine.

=== 2023–2024 ===
The fourth AFPAC was postponed after Fuentes claimed to have difficulty hosting the event in Washington, D.C., near CPAC in March 2023. After being removed from the premises of CPAC on March 2, Fuentes organized a brief rally at the Residence Inn by Marriott across from CPAC two days later. During his speech, Fuentes endorsed and expanded upon a CPAC speech in which Daily Wire host Michael Knowles called to "eradicate transgenderism" by adding that Satanism, feminism, liberalism, and Judaism should similarly be eradicated. On December 4, Fuentes announced that the fourth AFPAC event will not go ahead in December (as it was previously announced it would take place), but would instead take place in 2024.

In June 2024, Fuentes and far right influencer Jake Shields were prevented from attending the Turning Point Action conference in Detroit. Fuentes and his group were removed from the planned AFPAC venue, the Russell Industrial Center in Detroit, Michigan, shortly before the event was scheduled to take place. The next day, Fuentes addressed a crowd by megaphone outside of Huntington Place and stated his intention to reschedule the conference. This was also attended by Sulaiman Ahmed, an online disinformation influencer, far right social media personality Lucas Gage, and David Duke, formerly of the Ku Klux Klan.

=== Dissolution ===
In April 2026, The New York Times reported that Fuentes chose to discontinue AFPAC due to concerns for his personal safety. He says he debated starting a Substack column instead, but was too lazy to do so.
