= Lucas Gage =

American social media personality (born 1984)

- Born: Angelo John Gage; May 18, 1984 (age 42); Italy
- Known for: Activist, writer
- Children: 2

Lucas Gage (born Angelo John Gage; May 18, 1984) is an Italian-American political influencer. He was the former chairman of the National Youth Front, a white nationalist group. In 2026, Gage disavowed many of his earlier views, including antisemitism and related conspiracy theories.

== Early life and military service ==
Lucas Gage was born in Italy on May 18, 1984, and moved to the United States at the age of two. He has two younger sisters. He grew up in New Jersey in an Italian-American household.

After witnessing the 9/11 attacks on television, Gage enlisted in the Marine Corps Delayed Entry Program at 17. He attended boot camp at Parris Island, South Carolina, and graduated as a United States Marine. He then completed Marine Combat Training and Engineer School, graduating as a Combat Engineer. Gage served with the 8th Engineer Support Battalion at Camp Lejeune, North Carolina, and was deployed twice to Iraq for Operation Iraqi Freedom in 2003 and Operation Enduring Freedom in 2004. He was honorably discharged as a corporal after four years of service.

== Post-military life ==
After leaving the military, Gage struggled with post-traumatic stress disorder (PTSD), which affected his personal relationships and led to depression. He dropped out of college twice and had difficulty maintaining employment.

== Extremist activities ==
By 2012, Gage began posting on racist websites, promoting antisemitic narratives.

He joined the National Youth Front (NYF), the youth wing of the American Freedom Party (AFP). He ran unsuccessfully for a congressional seat in New Jersey with the AFP in 2014. He was disqualified for filing paperwork incorrectly. By January 2015, he had become the chairman of NYF, replacing Caleb Shumaker after Shumaker was forced out of the group because of his interracial marriage. He resigned later that year after encountering several fundraising challenges and undergoing a name change due to a threatened lawsuit. He handed control of the organization to Identity Evropa founder Nathan Damigo.

On Twitter (later called X), according to the Anti-Defamation League (ADL) Gage "posted repeatedly... about Holocaust denial and 'Jewish supremacy,' promoting long-standing antisemitic tropes".

In 2023, Gage rebranded himself as a pro-Palestine activist, amassing over a hundred thousand followers on social media for his strongly anti-Israel rhetoric during the Gaza war. The ADL identified him as one of five key far right influencers on X who had used the conflict to gain an audience, whose combined follower count increased by over 1070% in the period, Gage reaching over 286,000 in late 2023.

In June 2024, according to the ADL, Gage attended a far-right rally in Detroit originally organised as the 2024 America First Political Action Conference (AFPAC), organised by white supremacist activist Nick Fuentes, and also attended by Sulaiman Ahmed, an online disinformation influencer, and David Duke, formerly grand wizard of the Ku Klux Klan.

In 2026, Gage disavowed his earlier antisemitic views, including conspiracy theories.

=== Social media bans ===
Gage has been banned from multiple social media platforms, including Twitter (now X) and YouTube, for hate speech and inciting violence. On the platform X, Gage was known for posting racist and antisemitic content, leading to his account being banned in January 2021. He circumvented the ban and returned under the name Lucas Gage in late 2022. On March 6, 2023, Gage posted documents on X showing his legal name change from Angelo John Gage to Lucas Gage, which he filed on August 2, 2022, with the Superior Court of New Jersey in Ocean County.

In October 2023, Gage quoted Adolf Hitler's Mein Kampf and suggested that Israel was undeserving of sympathy following the October 7 attacks. He also claimed to have received $165 from X for high engagement on posts about Leo Frank, a Jewish man lynched in 1915.

In December 2023, his X account was suspended again for three months due to violations of the platform's rules against inciting violence.

== Abandonment of antisemitism ==
Following the assassination of Charlie Kirk in 2025, Gage started growing intolerant of antisemitic conspiracy theorists because of the unrealistic claims they were making about Jews. On Valentine's Day 2026, he publicly renounced antisemitism in order to build bridges with the Jewish community. Since his departure, Gage has been featured on multiple major platforms, including Living L'Chaim, The Jeremy Boreing Show, as well as being profiled in The Times of Israel and The Jerusalem Post.

== In popular culture ==
In the Twelve-Day War, Gage created the song "Boom Boom Tel Aviv", gaining immense internet notoriety over its support for Iran.
