= List of international organizations based in Geneva =

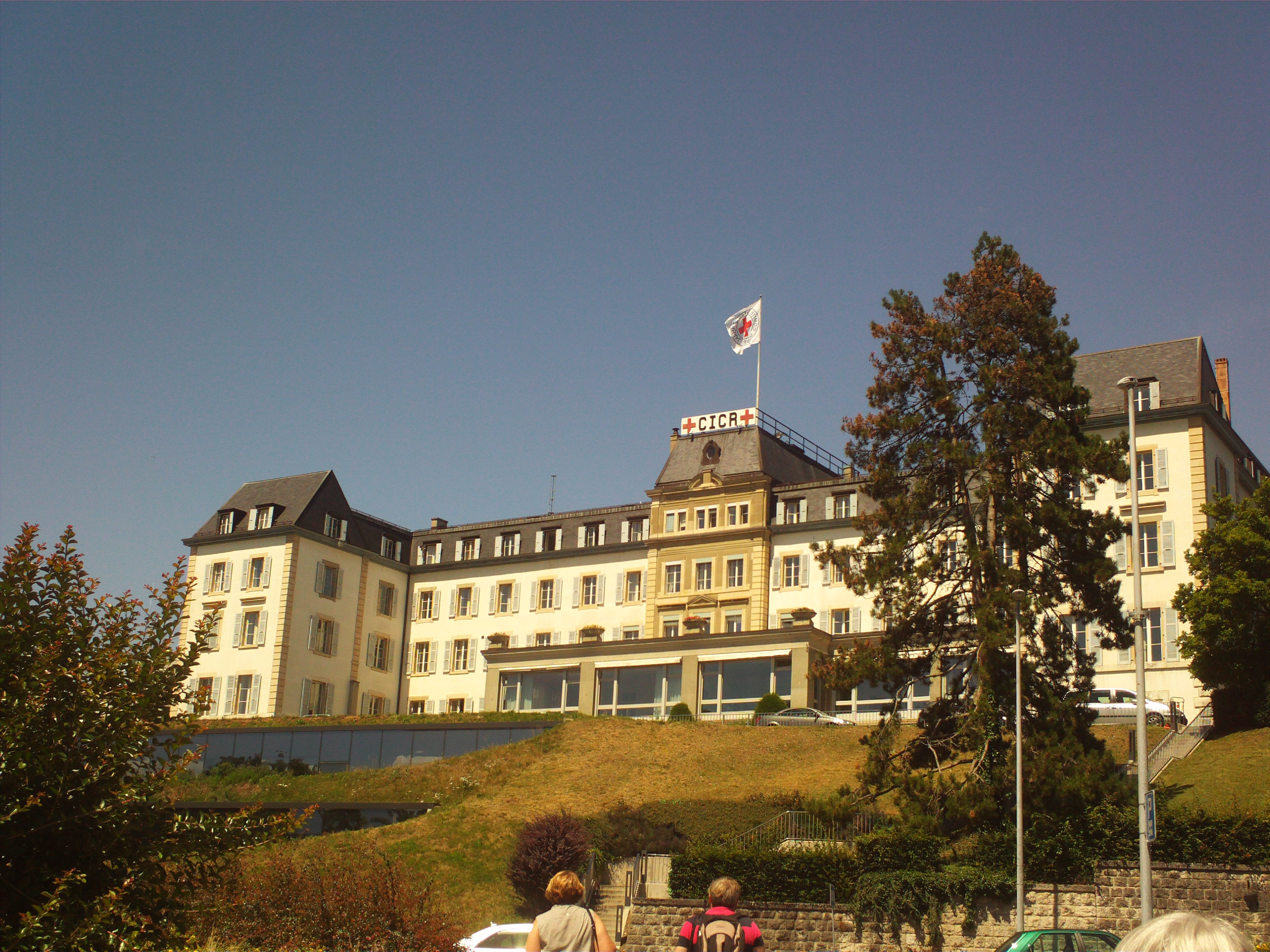
The headquarters of the International Committee of the Red Cross. Geneva hosts the highest number of international organisations in the world.

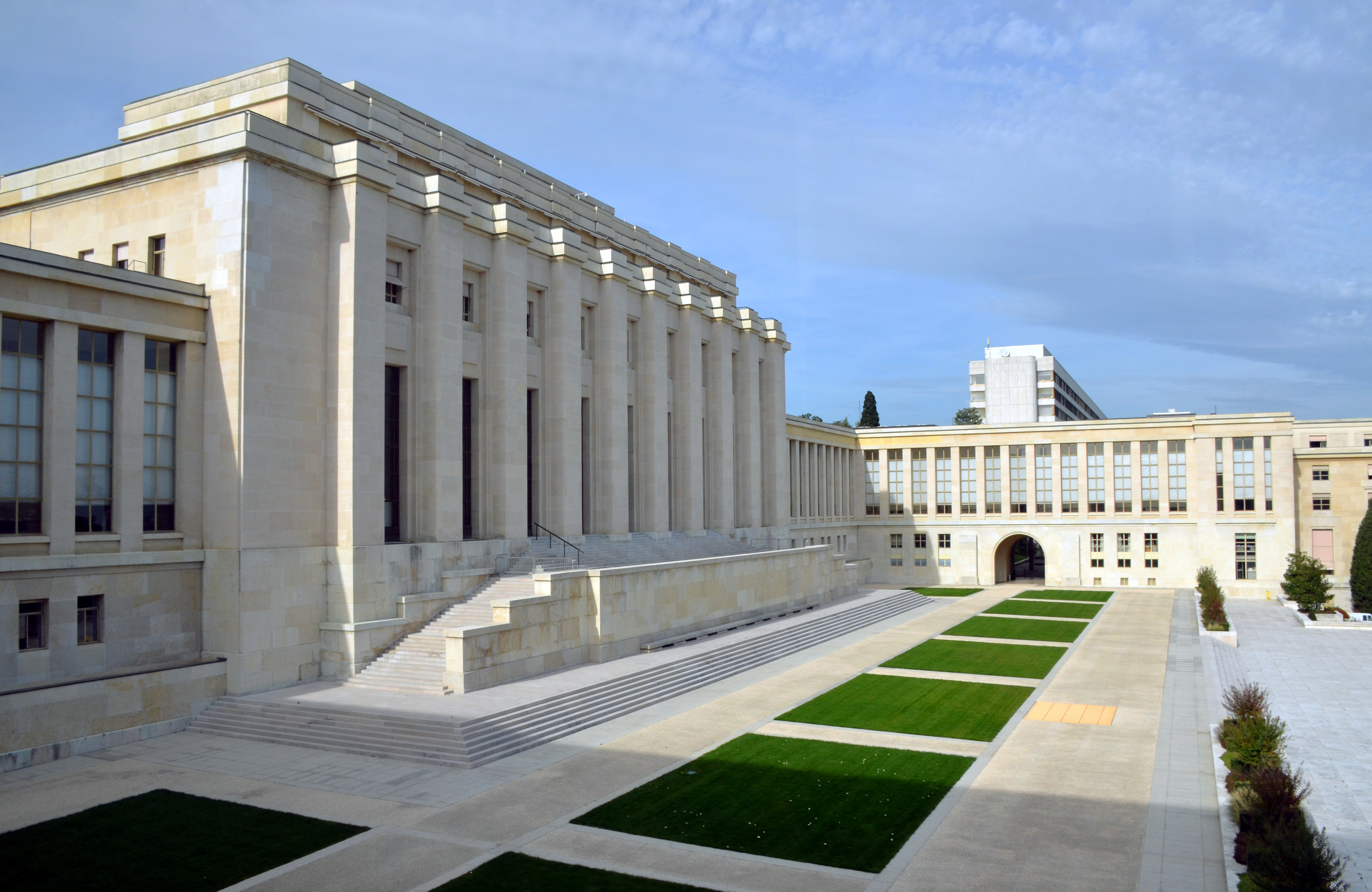
Palais des Nations, the main building of the United Nations Office at Geneva

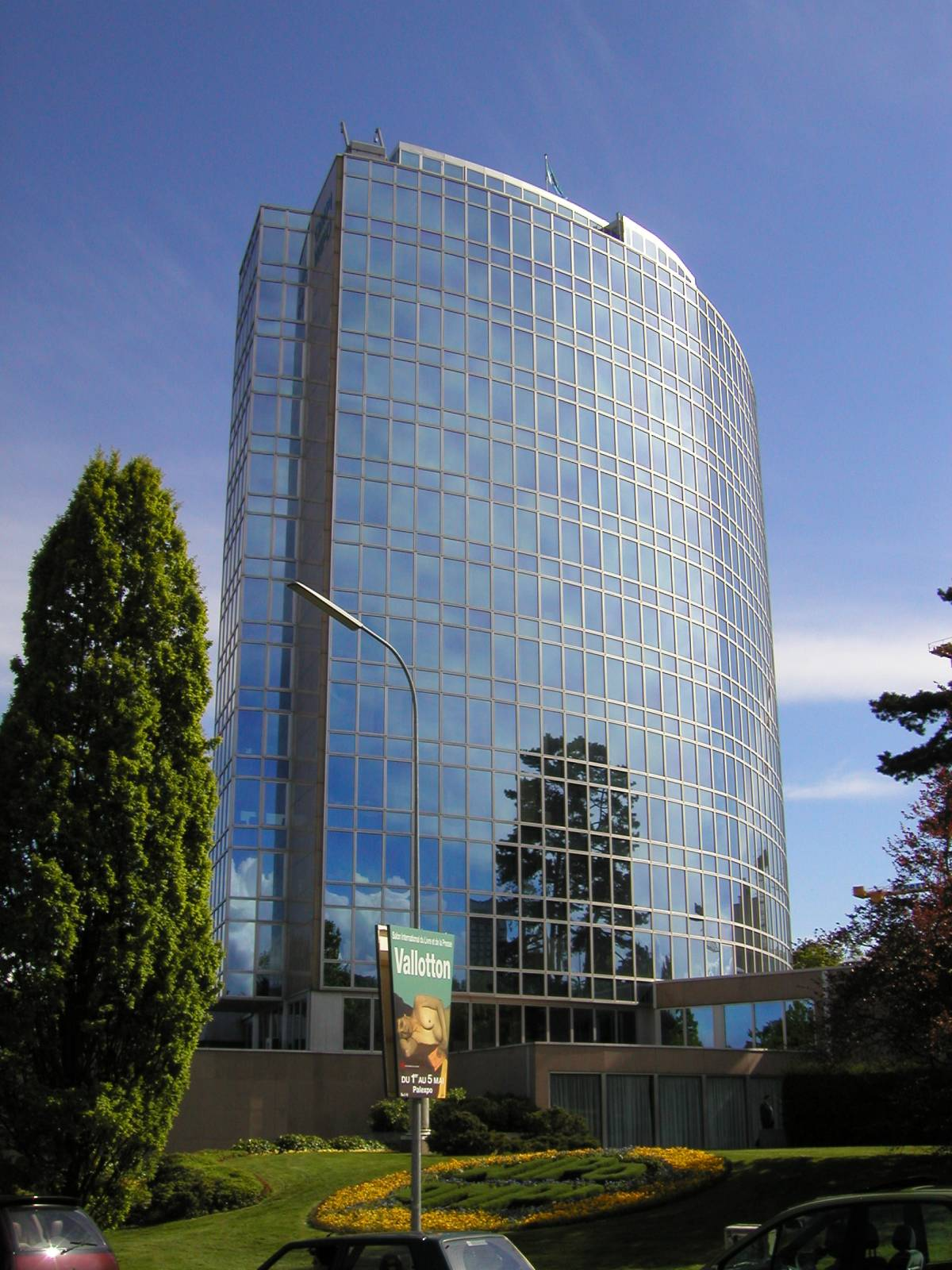
WIPO headquarters in Geneva

This is a list of international organizations, UN programs and funds and other organizations based in Geneva, Switzerland.

== International Organizations and Secretariats ==
- Court of Conciliation and Arbitration of the Organization for Security and Co-operation in Europe (OSCE)
- European Broadcasting Union (EBU)
- European Organization for Nuclear Research (CERN)
- Gavi, the Vaccine Alliance (GAVI)
- Geneva International Centre for Humanitarian Demining (GICHD)
- Geneva Centre for the Democratic Control of Armed Forces (DCAF)
- Global Fund to Fight AIDS, Tuberculosis and Malaria (GFATM)
- Geneva Centre for Security Policy (GCSP)
- International Bureau of Education (IBE)
- International Committee of the Red Cross (ICRC)
- International Electrotechnical Commission (IEC)
- International Federation of Red Cross and Red Crescent Societies (IFRC)
- International Labour Organization (ILO)
- International Organization for Migration (IOM)
- International Organization for Standardization (ISO)
- International Telecommunication Union (ITU)
- International Union for Conservation of Nature (IUCN) – based in Gland, Canton of Vaud
- International Union for the Protection of New Varieties of Plants (UPOV)
- UNITAID
- United Nations Conference on Trade and Development (UNCTAD)
- United Nations Economic Commission for Europe (UNECE)
- United Nations Institute for Training and Research (UNITAR)
- United Nations Office at Geneva (UNOG)
- World Association of Sign Language Interpreters (WASLI)
- World Health Organization (WHO)
- World Intellectual Property Organization (WIPO)
- World Meteorological Organization (WMO)
- World Trade Organization(WTO)

UN programs and funds:

- Joint United Nations Programme on HIV and AIDS (UNAIDS)
- United Nations High Commissioner for Refugees (UNHCR)
- Office of the United Nations High Commissioner for Human Rights (OHCHR)
- United Nations Office for the Coordination of Humanitarian Affairs (OCHA)

Other organizations and NGOs:

- Aga Khan Foundation (AKF)
- Airports Council International (ACI)
- Association for Plant Breeding for the Benefit of Society
- Cooperative for Assistance and Relief Everywhere (CARE)
- Documentation, Research and Information Centre for Indigenous Peoples (Docip)
- Elizabeth Glaser Pediatric AIDS Foundation (EGPAF)
- Euro-Mediterranean Human Rights Monitor (Euro-Med Monitor)
- Foundation for Innovative New Diagnostics (FIND)
- Geneva Call
- ICVolunteers (ICV)
- International AIDS Society
- International Baccalaureate (IB)
- International Campaign to Abolish Nuclear Weapons (ICAN)
- International Commission of Jurists (ICJ)
- International Internet of Things Forum (IoT Forum)
- International Lesbian, Gay, Bisexual, Trans and Intersex Association (ILGA World)
- International Road Transport Union (IRU)
- International Union Against Cancer (UICC)
- Internet Governance Forum (IGF)
- Inter-Parliamentary Union (IPU)
- IoT Lab
- Lutheran World Federation (LWF)
- Mandat International (MI)
- Médecins Sans Frontières (MSF)
- Programme for the Endorsement of Forest Certification (PEFC)
- Quaker United Nations Office (QUNO)
- UN Watch
- World Council of Churches (WCC)
- World Business Council for Sustainable Development (WBCSD)
- World Economic Forum (WEF)
- World Federation of United Nations Associations (WFUNA)
- World Heart Federation (WHF)
- World Jewish Congress (WJC)
- World Organization of the Scout Movement (WOSM)
- World Student Christian Federation (WSCF)
- YMCA, the World Alliance of YMCAs
- Youth With A Mission (YWAM)

== See also ==
- United Nations Office at Geneva
