= Water grabbing =

Type of Grab distribution

Water grabbing involves the distribution of water resources in a way that leaves one or more parties feeling the distribution is less equitable.

It also can have damaging environmental effects as watersheds are made unsustainable by overuse of limited water.

== See also ==
- Green grabbing
- Land grabbing
- Land rights
- Nestlé
- Water privatisation
