= EMVest Asset Management =

Private equity firm

- Type: Private
- Industry: Private equity
- Founded: 2011
- Headquarters: Pretoria, South Africa
- Number of locations: 2
- Key people: Susan Margaret Law Payne (Executive Chairman & Chief Executive Officer)
- Website: emvest.com

EMVest Asset Management is a private equity firm based in Pretoria, South Africa, with an additional office in London, United Kingdom.

== Overview ==
EMVest Asset Management was founded in 2011. It is a joint venture between Emergent Asset Management and Grainvest, a subsidiary of the RussellStone Group. The firm invests in landholdings in South Africa, Mozambique, Eswatini, Zambia, Zimbabwe.

In June 2011, the Oakland Institute revealed that Harvard University, Vanderbilt University, and other American colleges and universities had invested heavily in African landholding via this firm. They were accused of "landgrabbing." By 2013, Vanderbilt University, a university based in Nashville, Tennessee where students had led protests in the wake of the revelation, removed its US$26 million investment from EMVest.
