= Guillaume Blanc =

French historian (born 1982)

Guillaume Blanc in 2024.

Guillaume Blanc (born 1982) is a French historian, specializing in colonial and environmental history. He is known for his works on green colonialism.

== Biography ==
In 2013, Guillaume Blanc defended a doctoral thesis in history at the University of Paris 1 Panthéon-Sorbonne (co-directed with the University of Quebec in Trois-Rivières) entitled "The territories of national parks (Canada, Ethiopia, France): identity, heritage and national logics" under the direction of Professors Bertrand Hirsch and Stéphane Castonguay.

== Works ==
=== National parks ===
His early works focus on a comparative analysis of national parks in France, Canada and Ethiopia, where he studies the Simien Mountains National Park. He describes how international institutions of conservation has recommended to evict the 3 000 inhabitants of the park and to install armed guards to stop mixed farming. He demonstrates how violence is against the inhabitants of the park.

=== Green colonialism ===
In his essay The Invention of Green Colonialism, published in 2020, he offers an analysis of "green colonialism", which he defines as the use of nature in the process of colonization and its consequences in postcolonial societies. For him, the control of nature was a way to control African countries.

In his opinion, one of the expressions of green capitalism is that of the principle of "protecting Africa from Africans". He says colonialism erected the image, since the 19th century, of the African farmer as a destroyer of nature with deforestation and poaching.

== Criticisms ==
His work has provoked strong reactions in nature conservation circles. UNESCO Deputy Director Ernesto Ottone personally spoke in an open letter in Le Monde to refute Guillaume Blanc's arguments, arguing that "In Africa, making nature protection a great colonial design is not serious", and recalling that UNESCO reserves "are home to more than 250 million inhabitants worldwide [including] 21 million [in Africa,] in 29 countries", where their cultural diversity and way of life are just as respected as biodiversity.
