= Extraterritorial Obligations =

Obligations in acts and omissions of states

- Logo of the ETO Consortium

Extraterritorial Obligations (ETOs) are obligations in relation to the acts and omissions of a state, within or beyond its territory, that have effects on the enjoyment of human rights outside of that state's territory.

== Concept ==
Human rights are universal rights. When a state limits its human rights obligations as being applicable only within its own borders, this can lead to gaps in the protection of human rights in international political processes. Extraterritorial Obligations (ETOs) are a missing link in the universal human rights protection system.

The details of ETOs were laid out in the Maastricht Principles on Extraterritorial Obligations of States in the area of Economic, Social and Cultural Rights (Maastricht Principles) in 2011. The Maastricht Principles were adopted by international law and human rights experts from different regions of the world.

The Maastricht Principles oblige states to respect the economic, social and cultural rights of persons within their territories and extraterritorially. According to the principles, states must refrain from conduct which nullifies or impairs the enjoyment and exercise of economic, social and cultural rights of persons outside their territories.

The Maastricht Principles further determine that states must refrain from any conduct which a) impairs the ability of another state or international organisation to comply with their human rights obligations, and b) aids, assists, directs, controls or coerces another state or international organisation to breach that their human rights obligations.

== Legal basis ==
The Maastricht Principles do not purport to establish new elements of human rights law, they clarify extraterritorial obligations of states on the basis of existing international law. The principles are not legally binding, they are an expression of expert opinions regarding the status of extraterritorial human rights obligations in international law.

Nevertheless, the Maastricht Principles were explicitly drawn from international law with a view to giving effect to the object of the Charter of the United Nations and international human rights. Principle 8b of the Maastricht Principles refers to the United Nations Charter as the source of obligation, being a starting point for an evaluation of the legal character of ETOs.

The Universal Declaration of Human Rights, defined by the United Nations, is to apply to every person regardless of the political, jurisdictional or international status of the country or territory to which a person belongs.

The United Nations asserts that all states must take action, separately, and jointly through international cooperation, to respect the economic, social and cultural rights of persons within their territories and extraterritorially. States are also to refrain from conduct which impairs the enjoyment of such rights of persons outside their territories.

In 2007, The Extraterritorial Obligations (ETO) Consortium was established in Heidelberg, Germany. It is a global network of over 140 organisations and academics seeking to advance awareness on and the implementation of states’ extraterritorial obligations.

== Application examples ==
=== Climate change ===
Climate change highlights the need for an effective protection of human rights, which must be available to individuals and communities when they are faced with political, social, economic or ecological problems that are not limited by states' political borders.

Climate change has adverse effects on populations, their displacement having significant adverse consequences for children in Africa. Extraterritorial conduct by states or international organisations or their omissions associated with climate change has raised scrutiny. A report by the Office of the High Commissioner for Human Rights connects climate change and the enjoyment of the rights of the child under the Convention on the Rights of the Child, highlighting the importance of measures such as extraterritorial jurisdiction.

=== Land grabbing ===
Land grabbing in the 21st century primarily refers to large-scale land acquisitions following the 2007–08 world food price crisis, prompting food security fears within parts of the world. The discussion over the improvement of transparency in large-scale land acquisition includes addressing the extraterritorial obligations of states over international business enterprises.

=== Digitalization ===
The lack of global governance mechanisms for the use of digital technologies, for example in the public domain, and their commercialization is an issue. States have obligations to limit any potential unintended negative consequences, but in reality digital tools are being used to crack down on civil and political rights. The European Union is in the process of constructing a set of regulations for establishing and supporting a digital single market with the intent of recalibrating the current legal frameworks. One example is the General Data Protection Regulation, with the aim to give EU residents more control over their data.

=== Military conflicts ===
While states in the past may have contested any extraterritorial obligations on the basis of international law, which implies that a state is not to infringe on the sovereignty of another state, such obligations, in particular for the prevention of genocide and other atrocity crimes, are increasingly being referenced in international legal cases.

In the international case of Bosnia v. Serbia (2007), a state provided high levels of military and economic assistance to paramilitary forces located in another country that carried out genocide. In its 2007 judgment on Bosnia v. Serbia, the International Court of Justice found that states parties to the Genocide Convention of 1948 have an obligation to prevent genocide also beyond their territorial borders.
