= International Union for the Protection of New Varieties of Plants =

Intergovernmental organization

- Union internationale pour la protection des obtentions végétales
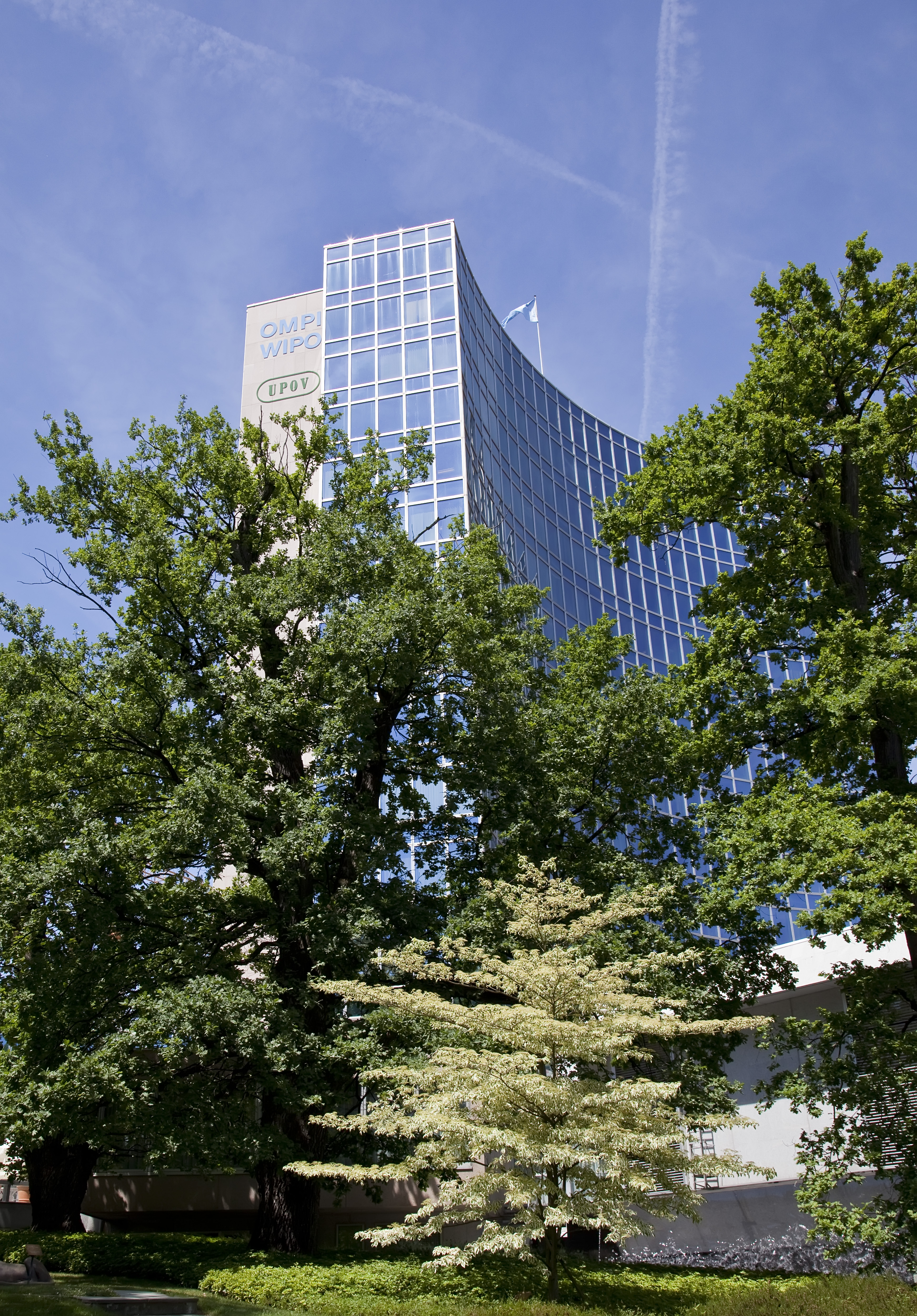
- UPOV Headquarters
- Abbreviation: UPOV
- Legal status: In force
- Headquarters: Geneva, Switzerland
- Secretary General: Daren Tang
- Vice Secretary-General: Peter Button
- Parent organization: WIPO
- Website: www.upov.int

The International Union for the Protection of New Varieties of Plants or UPOV (French: Union internationale pour la protection des obtentions végétales) is a treaty body (non-United Nations intergovernmental organization) with headquarters in Geneva, Switzerland. Its objective is to provide an effective system for plant variety protection. It does so by defining a blueprint regulation to be implemented by its members in national law. The expression UPOV Convention also refers to one of the three instruments that relate to the union, namely the 1991 Act of the UPOV Convention (UPOV 91), 1978 Act of the UPOV Convention (UPOV 78) and 1961 Act of the UPOV Convention with Amendments of 1972 (UPOV 61).

== History ==
UPOV was established by the International Convention for the Protection of New Varieties of Plants (UPOV 61). The convention was adopted in Paris in 1961 and revised in 1972, 1978 and 1991.

The initiative for the foundation of UPOV came from European breeding companies, who called for a conference to define basic principles for plant variety protection in 1956. The first version of the UPOV convention was agreed on in 1961 by 12 European countries. By 1990 still only 19 countries were part of the convention, with South Africa being the only country from the Southern Hemisphere. From the mid-1990s more and more countries from Latin America, Asia and Africa joined the convention. A reason for this development might be the TRIPS-Agreement that obliged WTO members to introduce plant variety protection in national law. Later, many countries have been obliged to join UPOV through specific clauses in bilateral trade agreements, in particular with the EU, USA, Japan and EFTA. The TRIPS-Agreement doesn't require adherence to UPOV but gives the possibility to define a sui generis system for plant variety protection. In contrast, clauses in free trade agreement are more comprehensive and typically require adherence to UPOV.

While the earlier versions of the convention have been replaced, UPOV 78 and UPOV 91 coexist. Existing members are free to decide whether they want to ratify UPOV 91 or stay with UPOV 78, whereas new members have to adhere to the more restrictive version from 1991.

== Membership ==
As of December 3, 2021 two intergovernmental organisations and 76 countries and were members of UPOV: African Intellectual Property Organisation, Albania, Argentina, Australia, Austria, Azerbaijan, Belarus, Belgium, Bolivia, Bosnia and Herzegovina, Brazil, Bulgaria, Canada, Chile, China, Colombia, Costa Rica, Croatia, Czech Republic, Denmark, Dominican Republic, Ecuador, Egypt, Estonia, European Union, Finland, France, Georgia, Germany, Ghana, Guatemala, Hungary, Iceland, Ireland, Israel, Italy, Japan, Jordan, Kenya, Kyrgyzstan, Latvia, Lithuania, Mexico, Moldova, Montenegro, Morocco, the Netherlands, New Zealand, Nicaragua, North Macedonia, Norway, Oman, Panama, Paraguay, Peru, Poland, Portugal, Republic of Korea, Romania, Russian Federation, Serbia, Singapore, Slovakia, Slovenia, South Africa, Spain, Sweden, Switzerland, Tanzania, Trinidad and Tobago, Tunisia, Turkey, Ukraine, the United Kingdom, the United States of America (with a reservation), Uruguay, Uzbekistan, and Viet Nam.

Members of UPOV - differentiated by the Act of the convention to which the state is party

For a country or intergovernmental organisation to become member, it needs to implement the requirements of the actual convention in national law. UPOV's secretariat analyises the regulation of plant variety protection in national law and writes a recommendation to the council whether or not the applicant shall be granted membership. In the past several countries have been refused memberships because their national plant variety protection laws granted exceptions for subsistence farmers to reuse and exchange seeds.

In addition, a large number of countries (e.g. Pakistan), intergovernmental organisations (e.g. European Free Trade Association) and international non-governmental organisations (e.g. International Community of Breeders of Asexually Reproduced Ornamental and Fruit Varieties) have observer status.

== System of protection ==
The convention defines both how the organization must be governed and run, and the basic concepts of plant variety protection that must be included in the domestic laws of the members of the union. These concepts include:

- The criteria for new varieties to be protected: novelty, distinctness, uniformity, and stability.
- The process for application for a grant.
- Intellectual property rights conferred to an approved breeder.
- Exceptions to the rights conferred to the breeder.
- Required duration of breeder's right.
- Events in which a breeder's rights must be declared null and void.

In order to be granted breeder's rights, the variety in question must be shown to be new. This means that the plant variety cannot have previously been available for more than one year in the applicant's country, or for more than four years in any other country or territory. The variety must also be distinct (D), that is, easily distinguishable through certain characteristics from any other known variety (protected or otherwise). The other two criteria, uniformity (U) and stability (S), mean that individual plants of the new variety must show no more variation in the relevant characteristics than one would naturally expect to see, and that future generations of the variety through various propagation means must continue to show the relevant distinguishing characteristics. The UPOV offers general guidelines for DUS testing.

A breeder can apply for rights for a new variety in any union member country, and can file in as many countries as desired without waiting for a result from previous applications. Protection only applies in the country in which it was granted, so there are no reciprocal protections unless otherwise agreed by the countries in question. There is a right of priority, and the application date of the first application filed in any country is the date used in determining priority.

The rights conferred to the breeder are similar to other intellectual property rights, such as patents, even though there are important differences. Their purpose is to create a temporary monopoly on a plant variety, to allow its breeder to redeem the costs he invested to create this innovation - typically the creation of a new variety takes 10 to 15 years and implies a substantial investment. The breeder must authorize any actions taken in propagating the new variety, including selling and marketing, importing and exporting, keeping stock of, and reproducing. This means that the breeder can, for example, require a licensing fee for any company interested in reproducing his variety for sale. The breeder also has the right to name the new variety, based on certain guidelines that prevent the name from being deliberately misleading or too similar to another variety's name.

In the 1991 convention there are four exceptions to the rights of the breeder owning a plant variety:

- Breeders exception: Even if a variety is protected it can be freely used by an other breeder as a source for new varieties, without the authorization of the owner of the original variety. With the introduction of the 1991 convention this exception has been narrowed down to exclude "essentially derived varieties".
- Farmers exception: In the 1978 Convention the reproduction of seeds, as well as their exchange with other farmers is implicitly allowed, because the exclusive right of the breeder only extend to the production for the purpose of marketing. With the 1991 Convention the scope of breeders rights were expanded to include the multiplication of a variety. However, there still is an optional exception that can be included in national legislation to allow reproduction of seeds of certain crops by farmers, but only "within reasonable limits and subject to the safeguarding of the legitimate interests of the breeder" which practically means that the farmers is obliged to pay license fees to the breeder. The only members of UPOV 91 allowing the free reproduction of seeds for some species by farmers are Switzerland and United States of America. UPOV secretariat never assessed if this implementation is in line with the convention as these countries already member of UPOV 1978 and national laws are only analysed for new members and not for existing members who update from UPOV 78 to UPOV 91.
- Exception for private non-commercial use: While free private use is implicitly allowed in UPOV 78, in UPOV 91 a mandatory explicit exception has been introduced. It allows the reproduction of protected varieties for private use, by amateur gardeners as well as by subsistence farmers. However, the exception only applies exclusively for the production of a food crop to be consumed by that farmer or gardener. In any case the exchange or gift of seeds or propagating material of protected varieties are prohibited.
- Exception for research: Acts done for experimental purpose are excluded from the scope of breeders rights UPOV 91, something that was implicit in UPOV 78.

The 1991 Convention specifies that the breeder's right must be granted for at least 20 years from grant date for perennial crops and at least 25 years in the case of varieties of trees or vines. In the 1978 convention minimum duration of breeders rights are 15 years for perennials and 18 years for trees and vines.

Finally, there are provisions for how to negate granted breeders' rights if the rights are determined to be unfounded. That is, if it is discovered after the application has been granted that the variety is not actually novel or distinct, or if it is discovered to not be uniform or stable, the breeder's rights are nullified. In addition, if it is discovered that the person who applied for protection of the variety is not the actual breeder, the rights are nullified unless they can be transferred to the proper person. If it is discovered after a period of protection that the variety is no longer uniform and stable, the breeder's rights are canceled.

WIPO Lex provides support for related IP legal collections, including UPOV Lex.

== Conflicts between breeders' rights and peasants' rights ==
Several international standards enacted by the United Nations oblige their member states to protect the rights of farmers to seeds: Article 19 of the UN Declaration on the Rights of Peasants and Other People Working in Rural Areas (UNDROP) grants peasants "The right to save, use, exchange and sell their farm-saved seed or propagating material." The same right is also codified in Article 9 of the International Treaty for Plant Genetic Resources for Agriculture (ITPGRFA). Furthermore, peasants rights to seeds are also mentioned in the Convention for Biological Diversity and the UN Declaration on the Rights of Indigenous Peoples. UPOV standards violate this rights in the case of protected varieties, as farmers only are allowed to save seeds within very narrow limits and are not allowed to exchange or sell any seeds at all, according to UPOV 91. Furthermore, as implementation of UPOV is based on predefined standards, there is little room for member states to fulfill their obligation to take into account possible effects on the human right situation in their countries and to allow for participation of farmers. In many developing countries, small scale farmers have not been informed prior to adopting and implementation of new plant variety protection laws and had no possibility participate in these decisions.

As UNDROP and UNDRIP are part of Human Rights standards, they are higher order norms and therefore they prevail over property rights on seeds, according to human rights experts. As a consequence, states are obliged to revise regulations in national law that violate peasant's rights and adapt trade agreement or other intergovernmental obligations such as UPOV.

In a report on seeds and farmers' rights to the Human Rights Council, Special Rapporteur for the right to food Michael Fakhri states that UPOV 91 violates farmers' rights. The report denounces pressures applied by industrialised countries on countries of the global South to join UPOV. It calls on UN member states to design and interpret seed policies and plant variety protection laws in a way that protects farmers rights and promotes farmers' seed systems rather than restricting them. Ethiopia, India, Malaysia and Thailand (all non-UPOV members) are mentioned as positive examples.

In 2021 the Supreme Court of Justice of Honduras deemed unconstitutional the Legislative Decree No. 21-2012 containing the Law for the Protection of New Varieties of Plants. The supreme court sacked the UPOV 91-based law because it judged it to be in contradiction with a range of human rights as well as with the obligation of the State of Honduras to protect the environment.

== Impacts of UPOV ==
=== Impacts on development of seed sector and accessibility of seeds ===
A study published by UPOV in 2005 evaluated the impact of UPOV compliant regulations in Argentina, China, Kenya, Poland and South Korea. The study found that in these countries the number of protected varieties of some crops has increased after these countries have joined UPOV. The report takes this as an indicator that farmers and the agricultural sector as whole has profited. However, the by far does not live up to the scientific standards for impact assessments and has been criticized being heavily biased.

A report from 2005 commissioned by the World Bank looked at the impact of intellectual property rights regimes on the plant breeding industry in 5 developing countries. It concludes that intellectual property regimes have relatively little effect on the emergence of the private seed sector. India, the country with the most dynamic seed sector analysed in the report, is not a member of UPOV and has no strict plant variety protection regime. Contrarily, the report states that farmer's seed systems are the main source of seeds and new varieties in the countries studied and that strict intellectual property rights on seeds may reduce the effectiveness of these systems. An analysis of the data from the Access to Seed Index from 2019, came to a similar finding: Many of the developing having the most vibrant private seed sector are not member of UPOV but have their own system of plant variety protection or no plant variety protection at all.

A study published by NGOs looked at the effects of the implementation of UPOV 1991 in francophone Africa in the 11 years after the accession of OAPI to UPOV. It found that in the 17 member countries only 117 plant varieties have been newly protected during this period, half of them had already lapsed because of nonpayment of fees. At least half of them were varieties that had been available before. The study finds no increase in plant breeding activities in the region; while breeding by the public sector continued independent of plant variety protection, breeding by private companies remained largely non-existent.

In the case of Iceland, no new variety has been protected since its accession to UPOV 91 in 2006, while 49 varieties had been newly protected in the 10 years before.

An increased number of protected varieties does not automatically increase the accessibility of seeds to farmers. In many developing countries the majority of seeds used by small scale farmers come from the farmers’ managed seed sector. Frequently, also seeds of protected varieties are saved, exchanged and sold. As these practices are prohibited in UPOV 91, farmers lose access to an inexpensive source of seeds while commercial seeds remain unaffordable for many.

=== Impacts on agricultural development and productivity ===
A study commissioned by UPOV examined the socioeconomic benefits of plant variety protection, 10 years after the accession of Viet Nam to UPOV 91. The study found that the productivity of 3 major staple crops increased during this period: Yield gains were 18% for rice, 30% for corn and 43% for sweet potato. The study argues that improved varieties which had been introduced due to stricter plant variety protection contributed to this development, and that 74 million people could be fed with the additional sweet potatoes. However, in the case of sweet potato that had the highest gain, no new variety had been protected and also for the other crops, productivity gains can be explained with other factors. A Study published by an Asian NGO finds that implementation of UPOV 91 in Vietnam did not lead to an increase of investment in breeding or in gains of productivity. Instead, it strengthened international commercial breeders at the cost of weakening the public breeders and threatening the farmers' seed sector.

=== Impacts on food security and poverty reduction ===
Smallholder farmers in the global South are amongst the groups most prone to poverty and hunger. They predominantly rely on seeds that are produced by farmers themselves, often also including varieties originally bred by public and private breeders. These farmers’ seed systems are often highly resilient and more accessible to famers than seeds offered by breeding companies. Through the implementation of strict plant variety protection in line with UPOV 91, and the restrictions on the use, exchange and sale of farm-saved seeds, farmers become more dependent on the seeds offered directely by breeding companies which often are unaffordable for the most vulnerable groups. As a consequence, adherence to UPOV would most likely have negative effects for poverty reduction and food security in developing countries.

The risk for food security that come with the implementation of strict regulations for plant variety protection might be an important reason why many countries of the global South hesitate to join UPOV or to update from UPOV 78 to UPOV 91 as the latter puts narrow limits to the farmer's privilege to reuse farm saved seeds.

In a report from 2009 the UN Special Rapporteur on the Right to Food, Olivier De Schutter, analysed the impact of UPOV on the right to food. He found that IP-related monopoly rights could cause poor farmers to become "increasingly dependent on expensive inputs" and at risk of indebtedness. Further, the system risks neglecting poor farmers’ needs in favour of agribusiness needs, jeopardising traditional systems of seed saving and exchange, and losing biodiversity to "the uniformization encouraged by the spread of commercial varieties".These findings were by his successor Michael Fakhri in a report from 2022 and by the UN Secretary-General in a report from 2015.

=== Impacts on biodiversity and genetic resources ===
Diverse genetic resources are the basis of all plant breeding and crop production. Breeders rely on farmers’ varieties and wild relatives as a source for interesting traits, such as resistance against pathogens and pests. The number of varieties has decreased by 75% in the past century and there is far less area planted to landraces worldwide as these have been replaced by scientifically bread varieties. Furthermore, crop genetic diversity may decline with concentration of area planted in a few favoured varieties and reductions in “genetic distance” between these varieties. The increasing dominance of few global seed producers and the implementation of increasingly strict plant variety regulation might have played a key role in this development. As the UN's Secretary General stated in a report from 2015, restrictions on seed management systems linked to UPOV 91 can lead to a loss of biodiversity and in turn harm the livelihoods of small-scale farmers as well as weaken the genetic base on which we all depend for our future supply of food.

The design of plant variety protection facilitates appropriation of genetic resources and biopiracy. Due to the criteria defined by UPOV, most landraces and farmer varieties cannot be protected and are therefore open for appropriation. UPOV 91-based PVP law also does not include a requirement for applicants to disclose the origin of their material and prove that the plant genetic resources used in the breeding process were legally acquired. In its guidelines, UPOV even explicitly forbids its members to request a declaration of lawful acquirement or prior informed consent (as required by the Convention on Biological Diversity) as precondition for granting PVP.

The documentation of a case in West Africa shows that the risk of biopiracy is real: A French seed company tempted to claim plant variety protection for the traditional onion variety “Violette de Galmi”. The claim was challenged by the Nigerien government, the seed company withdrew the application and submitted a new application for the same variety but under another name. The fact that challenging the application was only possible because the seed company used the original name of the traditional variety shows how easily varieties can be appropriated.

== Critics and resistance ==
Several social movements and civil society organisations such as South Center, GRAIN, AFSA, SEARICE, Third World Network, and La Via Campesina have criticised UPOV. Some of them have pointed out the resistance of the UPOV Secretariat and Member States to dialogue with all interested parties, in particular:

- by keeping meetings secret,
- by not making its documents publicly available,
- by refusing farmers' organisations NGO observer status with UPOV.

A study by Professor Graham Dutfield concluded that UPOV's governance falls short in many different ways, UPOV officials know very little about actual farming, and how small-scale farmers actually develop new varieties and produce them, and that they knew much more about breeding, which favours commercial breeders. The UPOV system thus favours commercial breeders over farmers and producers, and private interests over public interests.

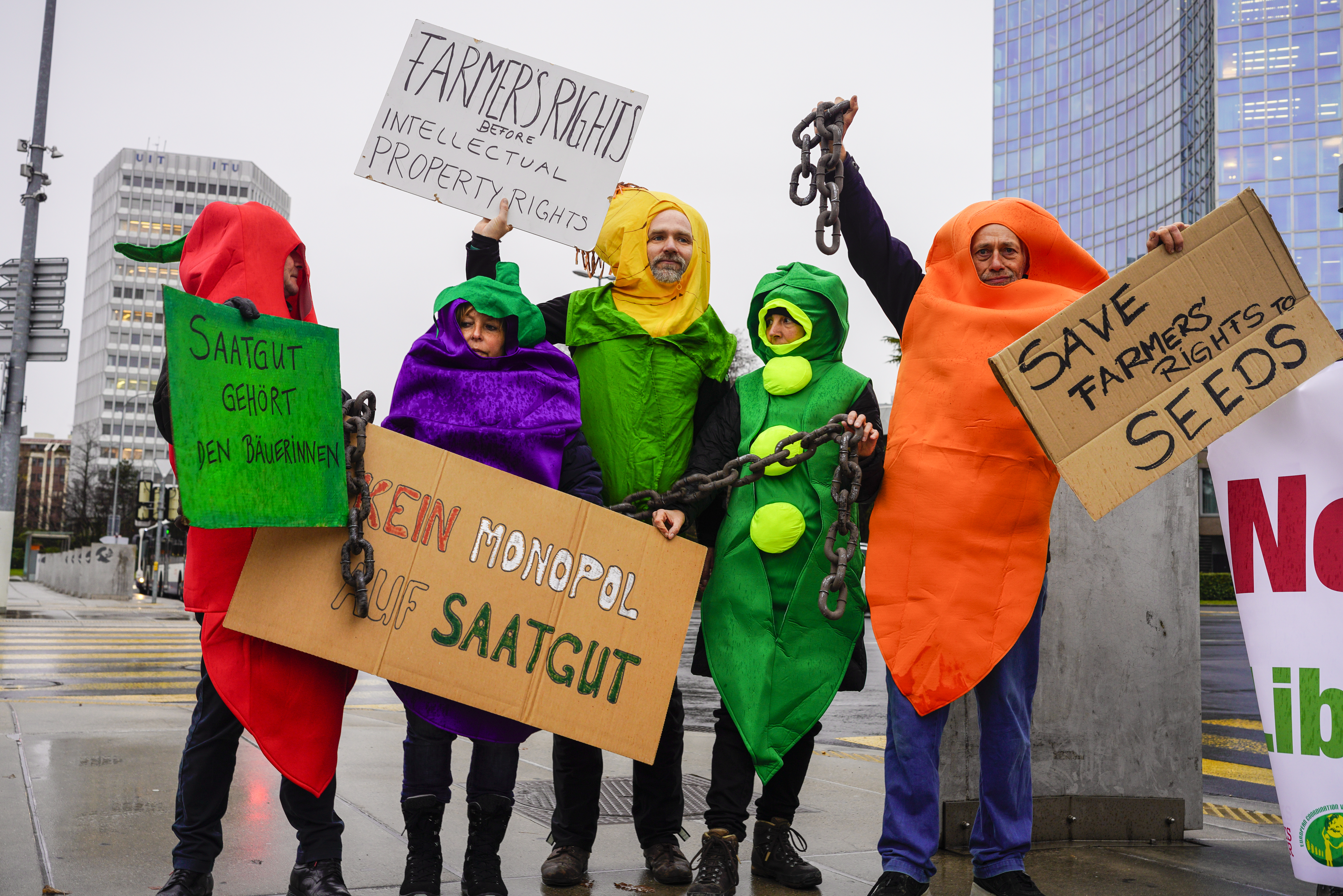
Activists protesting in front of UPOV headquarters

The intergovernmental organisation South Center criticizes that, while conventions of UPOV 78 and UPOV 91 have been negotiated almost exclusively by industrialised countries, they are imposed to all countries including in the southern hemisphere. GRAIN even blames UPOV of neo-colonialistic behaviour.

At the occasion of UPOV's 60st anniversary on 2 December 2021, a coalition led by GRAIN organised the “Week of Action: Stop UPOV”, with a call for action with over 230 signatories across 47 countries. In front of UPOV's headquarter group of activists from the Swiss Coalition for the Right to Seeds conducted a protest action, symbolically freeing plants from the chains of UPOV.

The week of action was repeated in 2022 with further protests in a range of countries.

== UPOV and free trade agreements ==
Many developing countries did not decide to join the UPOV agreement voluntarily, but were obliged to do so by free trade agreements. Examples of this are Peru, Morocco and Costa Rica, whose accession to UPOV was one of the conditions imposed by the European Free Trade Association for the free trade agreements subsequently concluded. There is increasing resistance to UPOV requirements in free trade agreements. In Switzerland, the responsible persons have received over 1,300 letters of complaint from various countries in the year 2020.

In his 2021 report on seeds and farmers‘ rights to the Human Rights Council, the current UN Special Rapporteur on the right to food emphasises that UPOV 91 violates farmers’ rights and criticises the pressure exerted by industrialised countries on countries of the Global South to join UPOV through free trade agreements. The report calls on UN member states to design and interpret seed policies and plant variety protection laws in a way that protects farmers' rights and promotes their seed systems rather than restricting them. Ethiopia, India, Malaysia and Thailand (all non-UPOV members) are cited as positive examples, as they "have adopted innovative national plant variety protection laws distinct from the 1991 International Convention for the Protection of New Varieties of Plants."

Currently, however, the EFTA states, including Switzerland, Liechtenstein, Norway and Iceland are negotiating free trade agreements with Thailand and Malaysia. In this context, both countries are demanding compliance with UPOV 91 as a prerequisite for these agreements. In a letter to the four countries in 2024, the UN Special Rapporteur pointed out that this approach jeopardises the right to food. Despite these concerns, the joint response of the EFTA states indicates that they will likely maintain their current practice.

== See also ==
=== Internal links ===
- Community Plant Variety Office (CPVO)
- Plant Variety Protection Act of 1970
- Protection of Plant Varieties and Farmers' Rights Act, 2001
- "Plant variety" (the legal term) vs. "variety" (the botanical taxonomy term)
- International Treaty on Plant Genetic Resources for Food and Agriculture (Plant Treaty, or ITPGRFA)
- Convention on Biological Diversity (CBD)
- Nagoya Protocol on Access to Genetic Resources and the Fair and Equitable Sharing of Benefits Arising from their Use (Nagoya Protocol)
- United Nations Declaration on the Rights of Peasants (UNDROP)
- Bioprospecting and biopiracy
- Plant genetic resources (PGR)
- World Intellectual Property Organization (WIPO)
- Association for Plant Breeding for the Benefit of Society (APBREBES), civil society organisation with observer status to UPOV
- SWISSAID Foundation (in German)

=== External links ===
- Official Website of UPOV
- List of UPOV members, with date of accession and respective act of the convention to which it is party
- Association for Plant Breeding for the Benefit of Society's analysis of UPOV's impact
- SWISSAID Foundation's seed information portal
