= StopAntisemitism =

American advocacy group (founded 2018)

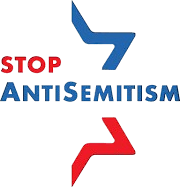
- Formation: October 2018; 8 years ago
- Type: Advocacy organization
- Executive Director: Liora Reznichenko
- Website: stopantisemitism.org

StopAntisemitism is an American pro-Israel nonprofit advocacy group focused on exposing individuals for alleged antisemitic statements and behavior. Critics have said it relies on doxing and mostly focuses on anti-Zionist voices.

== History ==
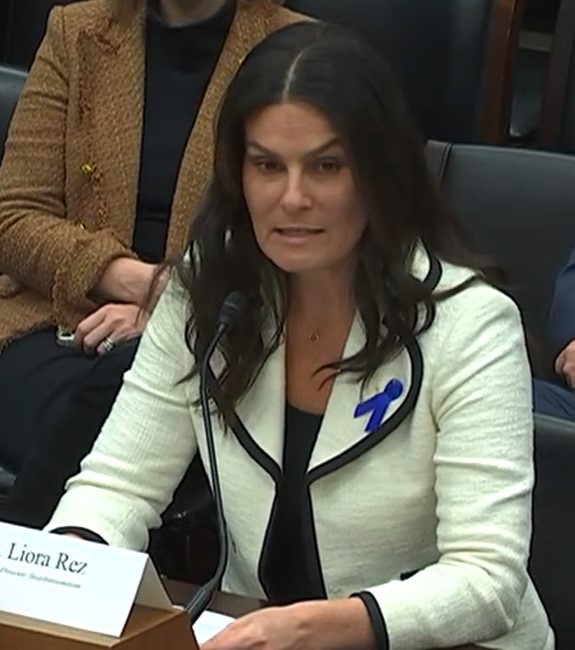
Liora Rez, the executive director of StopAntisemitism, testifies at the United States House Committee on Small Business in 2024

Social media influencer Liora Rez (née Reznichenko) founded StopAntisemitism in October 2018 to monitor and expose online antisemitism with a website, StopAntisemitism.org. She started her social media career in 2013 under the name "Jewish Chick".

Rez says the organization's goal is to "create consequences for those who espouse hatred and violence against Jewish people". In October 2025, Rez said the organization had profiled 1,000 people and that over 400 of them had lost their jobs.

The organization's social media posts were viewed more than 750,000 times monthly as of September 2019.

== Activities ==
StopAntisemitism receives tips about suspected antisemitic incidents via its website and social media accounts. The organization checks submissions for accuracy, ensures they have not been edited, and confirms incidents' locations. It does not post all the submissions it receives, and can take several hours to vet a submission, according to Rez. It researches individuals and their employers, both internally and using crowdsourcing, intending to create consequences and "expose antisemites" using a name and shame approach. In the aftermath of the October 7 attacks, submissions increased by over 1,500% to more than 500 per day.

The organization releases an annual report, Antisemitism on U.S. College & University Campuses, using a report card-style system to assess 25 U.S. universities' efforts to address campus antisemitism and protect Jewish students.

In October 2019, the organization sent a petition with 2,000 signatures to the US Department of Education calling on it to keep the Council on American–Islamic Relations (CAIR) out of college campuses. The petition said CAIR pushes "Islamist propaganda, anti-Semitism, and anti-American bias" on college campuses.

=== Pro-Israel advocacy ===
In November 2023, StopAntisemitism launched StopDontShop.org, a website that informs consumers about businesses it says supported Hamas in the Gaza war or expressed hatred toward Jewish people or Israel.

In April 2024, The Washington Post reported that almost three dozen people had been suspended or fired from their jobs after the group alleged they had made antisemitic comments, based on the IHRA definition of antisemitism, which includes denying Israel's right to exist.

In September 2024, StopAntisemitism, together with advocacy groups StandWithUs, End Jew Hatred and 2024 New Voices, organized an open letter urging the Biden administration to "protect and support" Israel and secure the release of hostages taken by Hamas in the Gaza war. The letter was signed by 62 artists and celebrities, including Chelsea Handler, Connie Britton, Andy Cohen, Mayim Bialik, Jennifer Jason Leigh, Patricia Heaton, Jill Zarin, Colton Underwood, Tara Strong, Baby Ariel and Montana Tucker.

In September 2025, StopAntisemitism tweeted that a boycott led by Film Workers for Palestine was against Jews and called for signers to be boycotted. Snopes reported that StopAntisemitism's claim was false and that the boycott targeted Israeli companies.

==== Denial of Palestinian civilian death and suffering ====
In October and December 2023, several social media accounts, including StopAntisemitism, promoted false claims that Palestinian children killed by Israel in the Gaza war were actually dolls, an example of what they call Pallywood, a conspiracy theory claiming that Palestinians fabricate footage of injuries and deaths to elicit sympathy. The Palestinian journalist who took the October 2023 video said it was in fact a four-year-old who had been killed in Gaza City.

In April 2025, StopAntisemitism criticized American educator and YouTuber Ms. Rachel for "spreading Hamas propaganda" and nominated her for its "Antisemite of the Year" award after she expressed concern for children in Gaza. StopAntisemitism called on U.S. Attorney General Pam Bondi to investigate whether Ms. Rachel was being paid by foreign actors under the Foreign Agents Registration Act. Its allegations were covered by The New York Times. Media analyst Adam H. Johnson criticized The New York Times for "relay[ing] [StopAntisemitism's] allegation... as a serious allegation that merited response, rather than as the baseless rantings of an online conspiracy theorist."

StopAntisemitism disputed a photo Ms. Rachel shared of a malnourished Gazan child, saying the child's condition was due solely to cystic fibrosis. The Washington Post later interviewed the child's mother, who said he was suffering from both cystic fibrosis and starvation. After the Gaza Health Ministry, Doctors Without Borders, and UNICEF reported multiple cold-related child deaths between December 2024 and February 2025, StopAntisemitism dismissed the reports as "fake cold deaths". The organization asserted that 1.7 million tonnes of aid had entered Gaza since March 2, 2025, despite the Israeli blockade on supplies.

In August 2025, StopAntisemitism accused Palestinian photojournalist Anas Zayed Fteiha of staging his photos of the Gaza Strip famine, citing an article by the German tabloid Bild. StopAntisemitism also called for the resignation of Sam Jacobs, the editor-in-chief of Time magazine, for using one of Fteiha's photos for Time's front page. The claims made in the Bild report were debunked by the Israeli fact-checking organization FakeReporter and the French newspaper Libération.

=== Antisemite of the Week and Year ===
Each week, the organization's website highlights an "Antisemite of the Week." Since 2019, the organization has also selected a figure as the "Antisemite of the Year". According to Rez, the "Antisemite of the Week" notifications went to 50,000 people per week in 2022.

Newsweek reported in January 2024 that the group named Rashida Tlaib "Antisemite of the Year" over Hamas leader Ismail Haniyeh in 2023. The New Arab reported in November 2024 that activist Greta Thunberg, politician Cori Bush, and actor John Cusack were included alongside far-right commentators Candace Owens, Jake Shields and Jackson Hinkle as candidates for the "award". Several of those named to the list have mocked their inclusion. Hasan Piker called it "unserious", John Cusack called the group "lunatics" and their statements about him "ridiculous lies", and Bassem Youssef said he would be upset if Candace Owens and Dan Bilzerian win instead of him.

The New Arab reported in November 2025 that the group named ten candidates for its "Antisemite of the Year" contest, including Ms. Rachel. The list of nominees was criticized for including celebrities such as Ms. Rachel, Cynthia Nixon, Marcia Cross and Guy Christensen alongside figures such as far-right personality Stew Peters, Holocaust denier Bryce Mitchell, and conservative commentator Tucker Carlson, while excluding white supremacist Nick Fuentes. The group responded to criticism for the nominations by stating that Ms. Rachel had "shar[ed] debunked images, inflated casualty claims, and almost entirely ignor[ed] Israeli child victims", and accused her of spreading "Hamas propaganda". Carlson was ultimately named "Antisemite of the Year" for 2025.

Ms. Rachel told The New York Times that she has spent her life "committed to the learning and well-being of children". Congressman Ro Khanna defended her, saying her activism was not antisemitic, and urged support for her. Jews for Racial and Economic Justice said StopAntisemitism had targeted her for her pro-Palestinian activism. The Intercept reported in December 2025 that she had received harassment and threats after the group included her in its "Antisemite of the Year" list.

==== Antisemite of the Year winners ====
Year	Image	Choice	Notes
2019		Ilhan Omar	Member of the United States House of Representatives from Minnesota since 2019.
2020		Nerdeen Kiswani	Palestinian-American activist and event organizer.
2021		Anuradha Mittal	Head of Ben & Jerry's Board of Directors; also known for her pro-Palestinian activism.
2022		Kanye West	American rapper and songwriter; made numerous antisemitic statements, including self-identifying as a Nazi, in late 2022.
2023		Rashida Tlaib	Palestinian-American member of the United States House of Representatives from Michigan since 2019.
2024		Candace Owens	American conservative commentator and author.
2025		Tucker Carlson	American conservative commentator and former host of Tucker Carlson Tonight on Fox News.

== Funding ==
According to Rez, StopAntisemitism is 100% privately funded. The Adam and Gila Milstein Family Foundation states the organization is among those they support. The Washington Post reported that the Merona Leadership Foundation pays the salary of Rez and provides about $270,000 to the organization.

== Lawsuits ==
A University of Michigan men's ice hockey player sued StopAntisemitism in late 2023 for defamation, saying they falsely accused him the previous September of spraypainting antisemitic graffiti at the Jewish Resource Center (JRC) in Ann Arbor. The JRC stated that the graffiti was actually homophobic and graphic, not antisemitic, and that the two parties had resolved the incident. A federal court ruled in December 2024 that the suit could proceed, but the player dropped it in May the next year.

The Intercept reported in December 2025 that a former music teacher in Oregon, a physician and former professor at the Emory University School of Medicine, and a Palestinian former Cabrini University professor had separately sued the organization for defamation. The latter's case was dismissed in federal court. In March 2026, the Chicago chapter of the Council on American–Islamic Relations (CAIR) announced a class action lawsuit against StopAntisemitism and Canary Mission.

== Reception ==
Journalist Jonathan Tobin of the Jewish News Syndicate lauded StopAntisemitism for carrying forward the education effort of established civil rights groups, such as the Anti-Defamation League. Rez was chosen by The Algemeiner as one of "The Top 100 People Positively Influencing Jewish Life" for her work with the organization in 2019, 2021, and 2022.

Viki Auslender of Calcalist questioned the appropriateness of the group revealing the employment location of a podiatrist who defended Hamas on social media. The Michigan Daily reported in November 2025 that progressives criticize the organization for equating criticism of Israel with antisemitism, and linked to an anti-Islamophobia website. The New Arab and The Independent reported in December 2025 that the group has been increasingly criticized for labelling public figures as antisemites for opposing the Gaza war. Critics accuse StopAntisemitism of bias against Muslim personalities, pro-Palestinian activists and non-prominent individuals, but its defenders point out that StopAntisemitism also regularly spotlights neo-Nazis and Holocaust deniers on the right. The first 6 figures selected as "Antisemite of the Year" were non-white people. Dylan Saba, an attorney for Palestine Legal, which defends people who support Palestine, advocated calling out StopAntisemitism for its actions.

== See also ==
- Canary Mission
- Weaponization of antisemitism
- Suppression of criticism of Israel
