= South Centre (organization) =

Intergovernmental organisation of developing nations

- Formation: 31 July 1995
- Type: Intergovernmental organisation
- Legal status: Treaty
- Purpose: Economic development for the South
- Headquarters: Geneva, Switzerland
- Region served: Global South
- Members: 55 states
- Official language: Arabic, Chinese, English, French, Portuguese, Spanish
- Executive Director: Carlos M. Correa
- Parent organisation: South Commission
- Affiliations: United Nations
- Website: southcentre.int

South Centre is an intergovernmental organisation of developing nations, established by an intergovernmental agreement (treaty), which came into force on 31 July 1995, with its headquarters in Geneva, Switzerland. It functions as an independent policy think tank, whilst also holding observer status at the United Nations and other development agencies.

== Creation ==
The South Centre was created by the South–South cooperation in 1995.

Its predecessor, the South Commission, recognized the need to strengthen South-South cooperation in international affairs. In its report The Challenge to the South, the South Commission emphasized the need for countries of the South to work together at the global level.

== Observer status ==
The South Centre has an observer status in the following forums:

Organisation	Date	Resolution / Website
United Nations General Assembly	15 January 2009	
United Nations Economic and Social Council	27 July 2006	
World Intellectual Property Organization	19 August 2002	
UN Trade and Development	12 June 2007	
United Nations Framework Convention on Climate Change	2 November 1998	
Convention on Biological Diversity		
International Criminal Court	21 November 2008	
World Trade Organization Committee on Trade and Development	4 June 1999	
Intergovernmental Panel on Climate Change	9,10 April 2008	
Group of 24		
Rotterdam Convention on the Prior Informed Consent Procedure for Certain Hazardous Chemicals and Pesticides in International Trade	28 April 2013	
WHO Framework Convention on Tobacco Control	12 November 2012	
Basel Convention on the Control of Transboundary Movements of Hazardous Wastes and their Disposal	28 April 2013	
Stockholm Convention on Persistent Organic Pollutants	28 April 2013	
World Health Organization (WHO)	23 May 2013	
Green Climate Fund	June 2013	
International Union for the Protection of New Varieties of Plants	16 October 2014	

== Member states ==
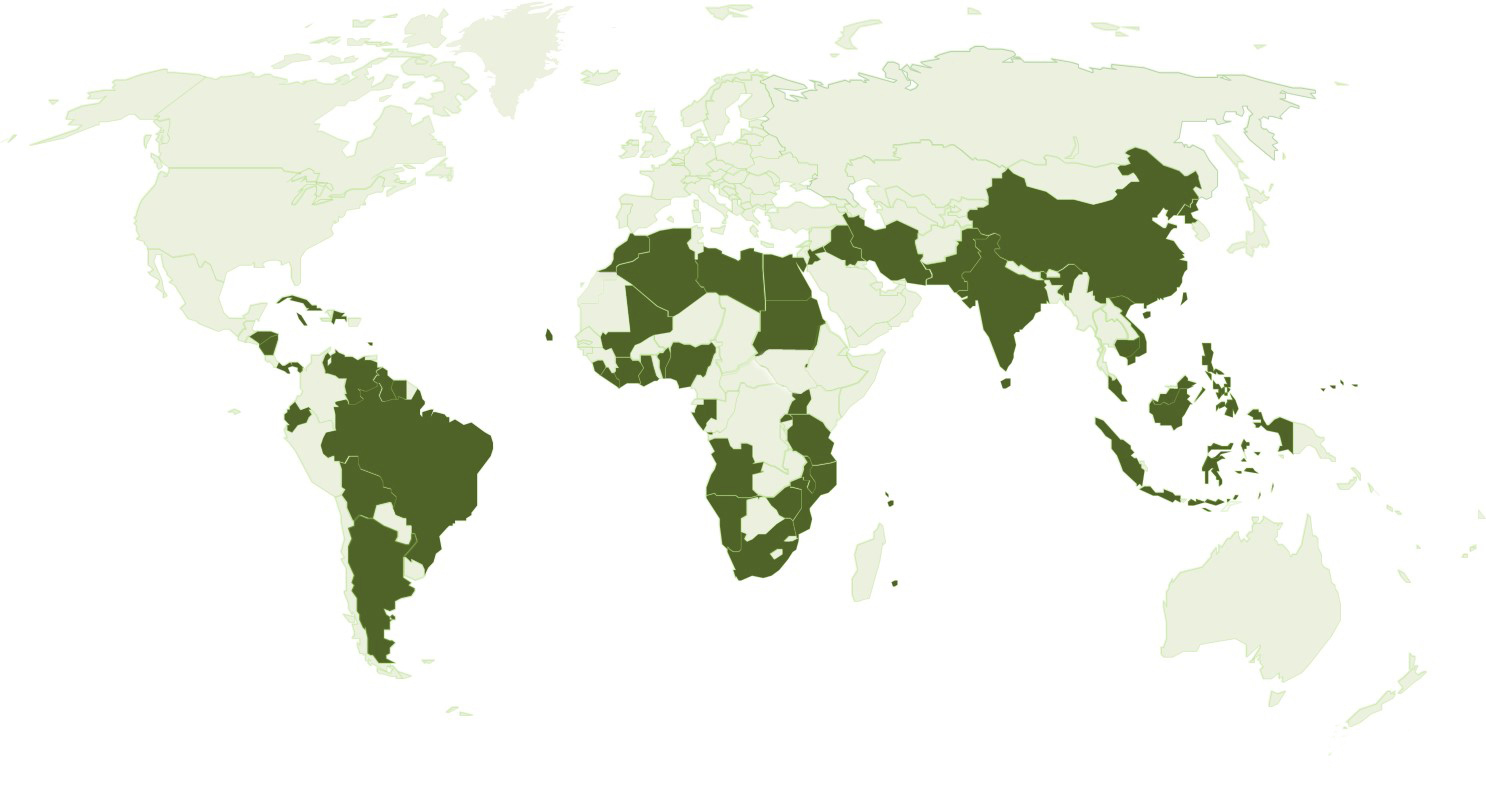
Member States

The Council of Representatives is composed of high-level representatives of the centre's member states. It meets annually, and on an inter-session basis when required, in order to examine the work of the centre and to provide policy and operational guidance. All states signing and ratifying or acceding to the agreement are required to appoint a high-level individual as their representative to the council. This individual should have been recognized for his or her commitment and contribution to the development of the South as well as the promotion of South-South cooperation. The council appoints a nine-member board and elects the centre's chairperson. From its members, the council elects a convenor and a vice-convenor.

As of 2026, the following 55 states have signed, ratified, or acceded to the intergovernmental agreement:

- Algeria
- Angola
- Argentina
- Barbados
- Benin
- Bolivia
- Brazil
- Burundi
- Cabo Verde
- Cambodia
- China
- Colombia
- Côte d'Ivoire
- Cuba
- North Korea
- Dominican Republic
- Ecuador
- Egypt
- Gabon
- Ghana
- Guyana
- Honduras
- India
- Indonesia
- Iran
- Iraq
- Jamaica
- Jordan
- Liberia
- Libya
- Malawi
- Malaysia
- Mali
- Mauritius
- Micronesia
- Morocco
- Mozambique
- Namibia
- Nicaragua
- Nigeria
- Pakistan
- Palestine
- Panama
- Philippines
- Seychelles
- Sierra Leone
- South Africa
- Sri Lanka
- Sudan
- Suriname
- Tanzania
- Uganda
- Venezuela
- Vietnam
- Zimbabwe

Former members

- Serbia and Montenegro (signed in 1994; ratified in 1996)

== Publications ==
South Bulletin, a regular publication of the South Centre, takes stock of ongoing debates on major global policy challenges and delivers regular flow of analysis and commentary to policymakers in the South.

The South Centre also publishes policy briefs addressing global development issues.

Research papers, published articles, analytical notes and other publications are made available in English, French and Spanish on the South Centre website under "Publications".

== Media ==
- South Centre Blog
- The South Centre Digital TV
