= Anuradha Mittal =

American activist

- Education: Indraprastha College for Women (BA); Oxford Brookes University (MPhil)
- Children: 1
- Website: oaklandinstitute.org/about/team/anuradha-mittal

Anuradha Mittal is an American activist and executive. She is the founder of the Oakland Institute, a progressive think tank, and chaired the independent board of Ben & Jerry's from 2018 to 2025.

== Early life ==
Mittal grew up in Kanpur, India. She graduated with a Bachelor of Arts in political science from the Indraprastha College for Women at Delhi University, and later earned a Master of Philosophy in political economy and education at Oxford Brookes University. Mittal has cited the 1984 Bhopal disaster as the inspiration for her activism.

== Career ==
In 2004, Mittal founded the Oakland Institute, and has served as its executive director. She chose the organization's name to invoke the Black Panther Party. The Nation included Mittal in its list of "Most Valuable Progressives of 2008".

Mittal joined Ben & Jerry's in 2007, and chaired its independent board from 2018 to 2025.

Mittal has endorsed the Boycott, Divestment and Sanctions (BDS) movement against Israel. In 2021, she praised Ben & Jerry's decision to end sales of its ice cream in the Israeli-occupied territories. That year, the pro-Israel group StopAntisemitism named Mittal as "Antisemite of the Year" over the decision. In August 2021, Mittal said during a webinar hosted by Americans for Peace Now, "We never talked about boycotting Israel. That was never on the table."

In November 2025, Ben & Jerry's parent company Unilever said Mittal "no longer meets the criteria" to serve in her role as chair of Ben & Jerry's board. Mittal later left Ben & Jerry's, after a new rule that imposed a nine-year term limit for board members. She said, "This October, Unilever-Magnum executives threatened me with defamatory statements in their forthcoming prospectus if I did not resign. At the same time, they offered me a prominent role in a multimillion dollar Unilever-funded non-profit if I gave in."

== Personal life ==
Mittal has a daughter.
