= CIOPORA =

International horticulture organization

CIOPORA is the International Community of Breeders of Asexually Reproduced Ornamental and Fruit Varieties (French – Communauté internationale des obtenteurs de plantes ornamentales et fruitières à reproduction asexuée, German - Internationale Gemeinschaft der Züchter vegetativ vermehrbarer Zier- und Obstpflanzen, Spanish - Comunidad Internacional de Fitomejoradores de Plantas ornamentales y frutales de reproducción asexuada).

CIOPORA groups together individual breeders of ornamental and fruit plants, breeding companies, as well as IP attorneys and consultants. Established in 1961 under Swiss law, CIOPORA is an independent non-profit and non-governmental international association, whose main objective is to monitor and to facilitate the constant development of the systems of protection of Intellectual Property (IP) Rights for plant innovation in the horticultural and fruit sector.

== Establishment ==
The founding meeting of CIOPORA took place on February 4, 1961 in Geneva, Switzerland with Wilhelm Kordes II elected as its first President. Preceding the Diplomatic Conference of November 1961 in Paris, where CIOPORA participated along with the representatives of 12 European nations, which resulted in the adoption of the International Convention for the Protection of New Varieties of Plants and the establishment of the UPOV, CIOPORA published its first position paper providing its comments on the provisions of the Draft Convention. This paper was distributed among the various delegations attending the Paris Conference in November 1961. Since 1961 CIOPORA has been representing the interests of breeders of asexually reproduced plant varieties before the policy-making authorities, such as UPOV, WIPO, WTO, as well as single governments.

== Mission ==
CIOPORA is set out to influence and participate in the development of systems of Intellectual Property Protection for breeders of ornamental and fruit plant varieties worldwide. Representing the interests of breeders in the horticultural sector, CIOPORA monitors the national and international laws targeted at the regulation of Plant Variety Protection, such as Plant Breeders' Rights, Patents and Plant Patents. CIOPORA pursues the enhancement, unification and synchronization of the relevant national and international legislation as well as the consideration of the breeders’ positions and interests by the law-making authorities. For instance, CIOPORA works closely with CPVO, the Community Plant Variety Office, by participating in its Administrative Council as an observer. The Secretary General of CIOPORA Dr. Edgar Krieger is a member of the CPVO Working Group of Legal Experts. The meetings of the Group take place three to four times a year in Paris, France. CIOPORA also an active participant and, from time to time, a co-organizer of the educational events held by CPVO.

== Status at UPOV ==
Since 1988 CIOPORA has been participating in the UPOV Council sessions open for non-governmental organizations. Currently, along with its independent observer status, CIOPORA participates in the Administrative and Legal Committee (CAJ), Technical Committee (TC), Technical Working Party for Fruits (TWF), Technical Working Party for Ornamental Plants and Forest Trees (TWO), as well as in the Working Group on Biochemical and Molecular Techniques, and DNA-Profiling in Particular (BMT) of the UPOV. CIOPORA has contributed to all three acts of the UPOV Convention (1961, 1978 and 1991) and submitted its feedback in the process of development of numerous other documents and regulations by UPOV regarding such topics as variety denominations, examination of Distinctness, Uniformity and Stability, harvested material, Essentially Derived Varieties, enforcement of breeders’ rights, etc.

== Structure ==
The supreme authority of CIOPORA is the Annual General Meeting (AGM) of its members The AGM of CIOPORA is held at least once a year. The date and venue, as well as the agenda of each year’s AGM are determined by the Board of CIOPORA. An extraordinary General Meeting can be convened on the proposals of the Board or of at least one fifth of the breeder members of the association.

The general management and the control over the affairs of the association are entrusted to its Board headed by the President. The Board of CIOPORA is composed at least of eight and no more than eleven members of the association, including the President. The President and the candidates for the Board are nominated by the Board and are elected by secret ballot of the AGM for a term of three years. The President of CIOPORA can be reelected once. The Board of CIOPORA chooses the Vice president and the Treasurer of the association from its ranks. The Board of the association meets at least two, and usually four times a year.

The administrative office of CIOPORA is located in Hamburg, Germany. It is headed by the Secretary General designated by the Board as a representative of CIOPORA in all external communication activities of the association targeted at the achievement of the CIOPORA's goals and objectives. The Secretary General handles the accounts and is in charge of all the administrative matters of the association.

The members of CIOPORA can create groups within the structure of the association, such as crop sections and working groups. Currently there are five active crop sections within the structure of the association: Carnation, Cut Rose (IRBA), Fruit, Gypsophila and Pot Plants. Working groups are created with the goal to work on a particular topic. At the moment two Working Groups - Working Group on Molecular Techniques and Working Group on DUS (Distinctness, Uniformity and Stability) – meet regularly in order to draft the positions of CIOPORA on the respective matters.

== Presidents of CIOPORA ==
Dates in office	Full name	Country of origin
2023 – present	Wendy Cashmore	New Zealand
2016 – 2023	Steven Hutton	USA
2011 – 2016	Andrea Mansuino	Italy
2005 – 2011	Lars Henriksen	Denmark
1999 – 2005	Maarten Leune	The Netherlands
1996 – 1999	Omer Schneider	USA
1987 – 1996	Peter Ilsink	The Netherlands
1983 – 1987	Jack van Andel	The Netherlands
1981 – 1983	Patrick Dickson	UK
1969 – 1981	Reimer Kordes	Germany
1964 – 1969	Sam McGredy	New Zealand
1961 – 1964	Wilhelm Kordes	Germany

== Secretaries General of CIOPORA ==
Dates in office	Full name	Country of origin
2004 – present	Dr. Edgar Krieger	Germany
1961 - 2004	René Royon	France

== Members and Supporters ==
Currently CIOPORA comprises over 160 members from 26 countries (November 2024). Single breeders and breeding companies from the horticultural and fruit sector, as well as title holders, breeder associations, IP lawyers and consultants active in the area of Intellectual Property Protection are eligible for membership in the association. The proportion of the different member groups is regulated in the bylaws of CIOPORA: the number of affiliate members, association members, lawyer members and honorary members must not exceed half the number of the breeder members in order to guarantee that CIOPORA remains primarily the community of breeders. Each membership candidacy is subject to approval by the CIOPORA Board. Natural persons and companies, which are prepared to support the objectives of CIOPORA, but do not qualify as members, may become supporters of the association. Currently, CIOPORA accounts for 6 supporters from four countries.

== Events ==
Besides the Annual General Meetings, CIOPORA organizes international conferences and seminars on IP-related topics within the framework of the educational services for its member community and interested parties.
