= International Land Coalition =

International organization

International Land Coalition (ILC)
- Founded: November 1995, Brussels, Belgium
- Type: International organization
- Purpose: Land tenure; Women's Land Rights;
- Location: Via Paolo di Dono 44, 00142 Rome, Italy, Italy
- Region served: Worldwide
- Members: over 250 members
- Key people: Michael Taylor (Director of ILC Secretariat); Fridah Githuku (co-chair); Jo Puri (co-chair)
- Employees: 45 (worldwide)
- Website: https://www.landcoalition.org

The International Land Coalition is a global alliance of civil society and farmers' organisations, United Nations' agencies, NGOs, and research institutes. ILC's stated mission is to "promote secure and equitable access to and control over land for poor women and men through advocacy, dialogue, knowledge sharing, and capacity building". Its vision is that "secure and equitable access to and control over land reduces poverty and contributes to identity, dignity, and inclusion". The ILC aims to build the capacity of its members and partners through people-centred development.

The ILC Secretariat is hosted by the International Fund for Agricultural Development (IFAD) in Rome, Italy, and is supported by regional offices for Africa, Asia, Latin America & the Caribbean, and EMENA (Europe, Middle East and North Africa) – the latter based at the ILC Secretariat itself.

== History ==
In November 1995, approximately one thousand representatives of civil society, governments, and multilateral institutions met in Brussels, Belgium for a Conference on Hunger and Poverty. The conference participants recognized the importance of equitable access to land for rural development, and resolved to create an alliance of civil society and intergovernmental agencies, which came to be known as the Popular Coalition to Eradicate Hunger and Poverty.

The conference issued a Programme of Action to empower the rural poor by increasing their access to productive assets, including land, water, and common-property resources, and by strengthening their participation in decision-making processes at local, national, regional, and international levels. In 2003, the Popular Coalition to Eradicate Hunger and Poverty was renamed the International Land Coalition (ILC) in recognition of its strategic focus on land access issues.
