= Mandat International =

Swiss-based NGO

Mandat International, also known as the International Cooperation Foundation, is an international non-governmental organization based in Geneva, Switzerland with consultative status with the United Nations Economic and Social Council, the UNDPI, and the United Nations Conference on Trade and Development. Mandat International is established as an independent foundation that aims at promoting international cooperation with a focus on research, international law, and sustainable development. It develops its own projects, while ensuring its complete independence from any religious or political influence. It also supports academic freedom.

== History ==
Mandat International was established as an organisation in 1995 and developed diverse projects and conferences in relation with the UN. Since then, it has been actively supporting international cooperation and conferences, and has participated in several international research projects.

== Description ==
Mandat International is a member of the Internet of Things International Forum and supports international conferences such as the IoT Week, Digital Around the World, and the Privacy Symposium.
