= Association for Plant Breeding for the Benefit of Society =

- Abbreviation: APBREBES
- Formation: 2009; 17 years ago Bonn, Germany
- Type: International NGO
- Purpose: Environmentalism, peace
- Headquarters: Geneva, Switzerland
- Region served: Worldwide
- Website: apbrebes.org

The Association for Plant Breeding for the Benefit of Society (APBREBES) is an international non-governmental organization founded in 2009 as a network to advocate on issues related to plant breeders' rights, peasants and farmers’ rights, food sovereignty, and the sustainable management of agricultural biodiversity. APBREBES has observer status at the International Union for the Protection of New Varieties of Plants (UPOV).

== Background ==
In 2009, seven NGOs joined to create the APBREBES: the Center for International Environmental Law, Community Technology Development Trust, Development Fund (Norway), Local Initiatives for Biodiversity, Research and Development, Public Eye, Southeast Asia Regional Initiative for Community Empowerment, and Third World Network.

The association's main focus are the International Treaty on Plant Genetic Resources for Food and Agriculture (ITPGRFA) and the Convention on Biological Diversity. The network is also an important critique of the implementation of the UPOV system of plant breeders' rights. APBREBES emphasises equitable access to plant genetic resources and ensures that legal frameworks respect human rights and environmental sustainability.

The association is active mostly at the UPOV, although it also occasionally works at the national or regional level, such as in Africa and elsewhere. In 2015, APBREBES developed guidelines for alternatives to the UPOV system for developing countries' plant variety protection laws.
