= Equatorial Palm Oil =

Palm oil company from London, United Kingdom

Equatorial Palm Oil plc (EPO) was a palm oil company from London, United Kingdom. It was listed on the Alternative Investment Market (AIM) of the London Stock Exchange. Equatorial Palm Oil plc was founded in 2005. Effective 20 December 2013, KL-Kepong International Ltd, a wholly owned unit of Kuala Lumpur Kepong Berhad acquired 63.181% interest in Equatorial Palm Oil PLC. Major brands including Kellogg's, Kraft Foods, Nestlé, Unilever, Procter & Gamble, and General Mills have been reported as direct or indirect consumers of KLK palm oil.

== Activity in Liberia ==
It has a concession in Grand Bassa, Rivercess and Sinoe Counties in Liberia of 169,000 hectares, including 1000 hectares of plantation land in 2010. It holds interests in 34,398 hectares of land at Palm Bay area; 54,550 hectares of land at Butaw area; and 80,000 hectares of land in River Cess County. Hectares of its plantation area in Liberia were set on fire in the course of a land dispute with locals. Some locals have accused the company of not putting people originating in the area into top jobs. Residents have often accused the district’s representative, Hon. Robertson Siawaye and others politicians of plotting against them and siding with the company to take away their land. Ellen Johnson Sirleaf said that they can rest assure that there would be no further expansion by EPO. EPO is accused of involvement in the arbitrary arrest and assault of Liberian community members who claim that they were resisting EPO's efforts to take their land. In September 2013, officers from the EPO security team and the Liberian Police reportedly worked together to assault and beat Jogbahn community members who were peacefully protesting the company's operations.

On 11 June 2020, Equatorial Palm Oil plc completed the disposal of its palm oil interests and became an AIM Rule 15 Cash Shell. On 13 January 2021, the AIM Rule 15 Cash Shell Equatorial Palm Oil PLC completed a reverse takeover of Capital Metals Limited and changed its name to Capital Metals PLC. Capital Metals PLC is engaged in the exploration and development of mineral sands resources in Sri Lanka and has no connection with the former palm oil businesses of Equatorial Palm Oil PLC.
