= Oakland Institute =

American progressive think tank

- Motto: The Oakland Institute is bringing fresh ideas and bold action to the most pressing social, economic, and environmental issues of our time.
- Established: 2004
- Executive Director: Anuradha Mittal
- Budget: Revenue: $521,395; Expenses: $384,075 (FYE December 2015)
- Address: P.O. Box 18978; Oakland, CA 94619
- Location: Oakland, California
- Website: www.oaklandinstitute.org

The Oakland Institute is a progressive think tank founded in 2004 by Anuradha Mittal. It is headquartered in Oakland, California.

== Mission and areas of focus ==
Since 2011, the Institute has investigated land investment deals in developing countries, particularly where there are questions about transparency, fairness, and accountability.

The Oakland Institute's mission is to "increase public participation and promote fair debate on critical social, economic, and environmental issues in both national and international forums". The institute works in coalitions and networks to strengthen social movements, especially in partnership with grassroots constituencies such as faith-based organizations, farm workers, immigrant rights groups, black farmers, and international proponents of food sovereignty and trade justice. One of the Institute's strongest commitments is to "elevate people's voices," holding that each of its projects is underlay by the voiced concerns of impacted communities.

The Oakland Institute categorizes its work into the following program areas:

- Climate change
- Foreign investment
- High food price crisis
- International aid
- Land rights
- Poverty
- Sustainable food systems
- Trade agreements

== Activities ==
In 2011, the institute detailed a $26 million investment made by Vanderbilt University in Emergent Asset Management, later known as EMVest Asset Management, a hedge fund accused of abusive practices in sub-Saharan countries including Mozambique, South Africa, Swaziland, Zambia, and Zimbabwe. The episode was covered internationally and led to student protests on campus in 2012.

== Achievements ==
Articles and opinion pieces by The Oakland Institute's staff and fellows and/or perspectives on its work are regularly published in U.S. media outlets including Alternet, Slate, The Huffington Post, Inter Press Service, and The Chronicle of Philanthropy.

Work from the Institute has been used in the United Nations Conference on Trade and Development and by the Intergovernmental Group of Twenty-Four—the only formal developing county group addressed by the IMF and the World Bank.

In 2015, the Institute founded its Legal Defense Fund, which supports land rights activists around the world. In 2022, the Institute supported partners in Tanzania, Mali, Kenya, the Democratic Republic of the Congo, and Nicaragua.

== Awards and recognition ==
The Nation magazine recognized the institute's work, and the efforts of Anuradha Mittal in particular, in their list of Most Valuable Progressives of 2008. The Oakland Institute received the United Nations Association East Bay's Global Citizen Award in 2007 and the KPFA Peace Award in 2006. in 2012, the Oakland Institute was honored by the Responsible Endowments Coalition for its leadership in drawing attention to college and university investments in land grabs in Africa.

== Controversies ==
In 2021, the Oakland Institute was involved in a watchdog complaint to the IRS that alleged self-dealing by Mittal, who is also the vice president of Ben & Jerry's non-profit foundation. In 2017 and 2018, Ben & Jerry's foundation paid $104,000 to the Oakland Institute, where Mittal is the only salaried employee; during this time, the Oakland Institute paid Mittal a salary of $156,000.
