= Green grabbing =

Foreign appropriation of land and resources for environmental purposes

Green grabbing or green colonialism is the foreign land grabbing and appropriation of resources for environmental purposes, resulting in a pattern of unjust development. The purposes of green grabbing are varied; it can be done for ecotourism, conservation of biodiversity or ecosystem services, for carbon emission trading, or for biofuel production. It involves governments, NGOs, and corporations, often working in alliances. Green grabs can result in local residents' displacement from land where they live or make their livelihoods. It is considered to be a subtype of green imperialism.

== Definition and purpose ==
"Green grabbing" was first coined in 2008 by journalist John Vidal, in a piece that appeared in The Guardian called "The great green land grab". Social anthropologist Melissa Leach notes that it "builds on well-known histories of colonial and neo-colonial resource alienation in the name of the environment". Green grabbing is a more specific form of land grabbing, in which the motive of the land grab is for environmental reasons. Green grabbing can be done for conservation of biodiversity or ecosystem services, carbon emission trading, or for ecotourism. Conservation groups might encourage members of the public to donate money to "adopt" an acre of land, which goes towards land acquisition. Companies who engage in carbon emission trading might employ a green grab to plant trees—the resulting carbon offset can then be sold or traded. One program, Reducing emissions from deforestation and forest degradation (REDD+), compensates companies and countries for conserving forests, though the definition of forest also includes forest plantations consisting of a single tree species (monoculture).

Green grabbing can also be done for the production of biofuels. Biofuel production efforts, led by the US and European Union, have been a main driver of land grabbing in general. The International Land Coalition states that 59% of land grabs between 2000 and 2010 were because of biofuels.

== Occurrence and affected parties ==
Indebted governments may be especially vulnerable to green grabs, as they may agree to privatize and sell public assets to avoid bankruptcy. Green grabs involve large tracts of land consisting of thousands or millions of hectares. Green grabs have occurred in Africa, Latin America, and Southeast Asia. Environmental activists and critics have also warned that the Green New Deal and COP26 could exacerbate green colonialism.

The indigenous Sámi community of northern Scandinavia, as well as Norwegian and Swedish activists, have accused the Norwegian government of green colonialism because of the construction of wind farms on Sámi land.

Israel’s worst wildfires were reportedly exacerbated by non-native tree species that Israel has been planting for decades.

== Actors ==
Modern green grabs are often enacted through alliances between national elites, government agencies, and private actors. Examples can include international environmental policy institutions, multi-national corporations, and non-governmental organizations (NGOs). These varied actors align to achieve common goals; for example, ecotourism initiatives can result in the alignment of tourism companies, conservation groups, and governments. Conservation groups can also align with military or paramilitary groups to accomplish shared aims. Actors can also include entrepreneurs trying to profit from eco-capitalism, such as companies developing forest carbon offset projects, biochar companies, and pharmaceutical businesses.

=== ICDP in Madagascar ===
The Integrated Conservation and Development Projects (ICDP) in Madagascar were mostly managed by NGOs supported by the state government. Neoliberalism led to decentralized conservation efforts from the 1990s until the mid 2000s. At that point, there ceased being monetary compensation from the government in favor of conservation efforts being contracted out to North American organizations. The internal division between high status and high paid jobs of North American workers in comparison to the low wage work of Madagascarans as the enforcers of unpopular fortress conservation through the creation of nature reserves. The Malagasy people within Madagascar see the conservation efforts as attempts at green grabbing and neocolonialism. North American NGOs have responded to the claims as ungrounded, placing the lack of acceptance of the reserves system as a failure in the education and understanding of sustainability of residents. In 2009, the presidential administration of Marc Ravalomanana considered a deal with Daewoo Logistics, a South Korean company, to lease 1.3 million hectares of arable land to grow maize and palm oil. This potential deal was seen as another attempt at colonialism, as the land was to be used by and for foreign nations while a large portion of land, up to 10 percent, was being allotted for conservation reserve. Protest against the negotiations was responded to with military action, leading to the removal of Ravalomanana. The deal was not put into effect and the resistance and protest of Madagascarans led to closure of multiple national parks and reserves, allowing the residents to continue their use of the land.

== Implications ==
Green grabbing can result in the expulsion of indigenous or peasant communities from the land they live on. In other cases, the use, authority, and management of the resources is restructured, potentially alienating local residents. Evictions due to palm oil biofuel has resulted in the displacement of millions of people in Indonesia, Papua New Guinea, Malaysia, and India. The practice has been criticized in Brazil, where the government referred to one land acquisition NGO as eco-colonialist. A shaman of the Yanomami tribe published a statement through Survival International saying, "Now you want to buy pieces of rainforest, or to plant biofuels. These are useless. The forest cannot be bought; it is our life and we have always protected it. Without the forest, there is only sickness." The head of the Forest Peoples Programme Simon Colchester said, "Conservation has immeasurably worsened the lives of indigenous peoples throughout Africa," noting that it resulted in forced expulsion, loss of livelihoods, and violation of human rights.

== See also ==
- Fortress conservation
- Antarctic Treaty System
