= GRAIN =

GRAIN is a small international non-profit organisation that works to support small farmers and social movements in their struggles for community-controlled and biodiversity-based food systems.

GRAIN's work goes back to the early 1980s, when a number of activists around the world started drawing attention to the loss of genetic diversity on farms.

GRAIN began doing research, advocacy and lobbying work under the auspices of a coalition of mostly European development organisations. That work soon expanded into a larger program and network that needed its own footing. In 1990, GRAIN was legally established as an independent non-profit foundation with its headquarters in Barcelona, Spain.

By the mid-1990s, GRAIN embarked on a decentralization process that brought them into closer contact with realities on the ground in the Global South, and into direct collaboration with partners working at that level. At the same time, they brought a number of those partners into their governing body and started regionalizing their staff pool.

In 2011, the organisation received the Right Livelihood Award "for their worldwide work to protect the livelihoods and rights of farming communities and to expose the massive purchases of farmland in developing countries by foreign financial interests."
