= Jett Prescott =

American singer-songwriter (born 1989)

- Jett performing live in Los Angeles

Background information
- Born: Tyler William Prescott; October 10, 1989 (age 36)
- Origin: Harrisburg, Pennsylvania
- Genres: Alternative rock; Indie; Pop
- Occupations: Musician; Singer; Songwriter; Producer
- Instruments: Vocals; Piano; Guitar; Bass; Synthesizer; Percussion
- Label: PennyFly Entertainment
- Website: jettprescott.com

Tyler William Prescott (born October 10, 1989), known professionally as Jett Prescott (stylized as j3tt), is an American independent singer-songwriter, multi-instrumentalist, and entrepreneur. Music Connection named Jett Prescott second among the top 25 new artists of the year based on their review of his eponymous release, the Jett Prescott EP. Jett was recognized as the top solo musician in Los Angeles by worldwide-leading wedding organization The Knot in 2015. Since founding PennyFly Entertainment in 2017, the company has been acknowledged as the only record label to achieve placement among Pepperdine University's Top 100 "Most Fundable Companies", having earned placement in both 2020 and 2022. Jett has been featured in Rolling Stone as a member of their expert panels.

== Early life and education ==
Born and raised in central Pennsylvania, Prescott spent much of his early life focused on academics; specifically computers. Jett graduated from Penn State University with a Bachelor's of Science in Cyber Security while teaching himself piano and guitar.

== Career ==
The success of Jett's early basement demos landed a 5-day recording session at the acclaimed Clear Track Studios in Clearwater, Florida. These sessions yielded the 4-track eponymous Jett Prescott EP, mastered by Scott Hull. The independently released EP sees worldwide rotation on Pandora Internet Radio. Music Connection favorably reviewed the EP and went on to name Jett Prescott #2 among the top 25 new artists from 2013, which followed a homepage feature on ReverbNation. “Put Me Down in Wine” received high praise from SongOfTheYear.com, garnering airplay on radio networks including Sirius XMU, The Darryn Yates Show, RevolverUnderground, The Emerge Radio Networks, and GagOrder Network. Jett revealed in interviews with “New Music Inferno” and red-carpet celebrity interviewer Jeffrey Henderson that he had relocated to Los Angeles to focus on the recording of his first full-length album with producers PJ Bianco and Gary Miller. Jett is additionally included on the forthcoming "Set Them Free" album alongside Slash, Fergie, Santana, Rob Thomas, Journey, and other artists in support of the Rock Against Trafficking project. Locals can find Jett performing venues such as The Lighthouse Café and Hollywood's “The Piano Bar”. After a hiatus of nearly seven years from releasing solo material, Prescott returned to music in 2025 with the release of new recordings, including the singles Dangerously Free and Kneel Before the King. His return was discussed in a televised interview in New York City that highlighted his renewed recording activity.

== PennyFly Entertainment ==
Shortly after receiving signing offers from Epic and Sony upon his relocation to Los Angeles, Prescott made the decision to remain independent by founding PennyFly Entertainment, a "by-artists-for-artists" record company. Rolling Stone published an article highlighting PennyFly Entertainment's impact on the music industry, particularly with independent artists. PennyFly is a full-service entertainment company providing management and marketing services for artists and producers including PJ Bianco, Gary Miller, Steve Thompson, Ricky Rebel, and Kim Se-hwang with projects including Rock Against Trafficking and Poo Bear's upcoming reality TV venture known as StarCrowd. PennyFly has continued to work with a variety of artists including Gabbie Hanna, Kodie Shane, Meredith O'Connor, Mary Wilson, Rebecca Black, Ruggero Pasquarelli, Minzy, and more across several projects.

PennyFly Entertainment has received recognition from Pepperdine University as one of the most fundable companies in the United States on two occasions, and was identified by HackerNoon as one of the top startups of 2023 for its use of artificial intelligence and business model innovation.
