= Gary Miller (music producer) =

English musical artist (1960–2022)

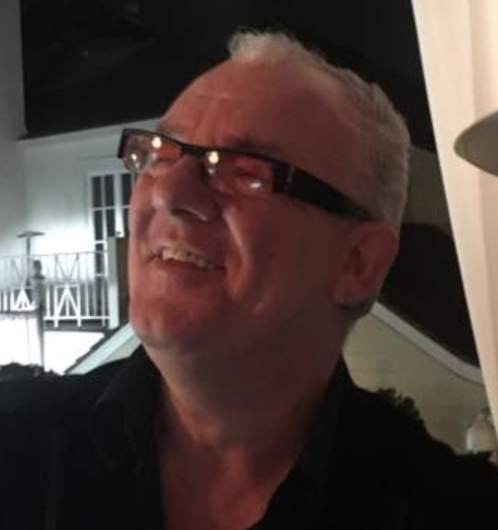
- Miller in March 2016

Background information
- Born: 29 February 1960; Kingston Upon Hull, Yorkshire, England
- Died: 5 May 2022 (aged 62)
- Genres: Pop, rock
- Occupations: Music producer, songwriter, guitarist
- Instrument: Guitar
- Years active: 1980–2022
- Website: loud-waves.com

Gary Miller (29 February 1960 – 5 May 2022) was an English record producer, songwriter, arranger and multi-instrumentalist. In his early years, Miller worked for the London production house Stock Aitken Waterman as staff producer, mixer, and songwriter, and was later part of the Metrophonic team. While at Stock Aitken Waterman and Metrophonic, he worked on songs for Donna Summer, Lionel Richie, Kylie Minogue, Bananarama, and Simply Red, and was one of the producers of the David Bowie song "Everyone Says 'Hi'", which was released in 2002 on the album Heathen.

Miller started his music career during the 1980s as a guitarist, touring with Nik Kershaw's backing band The Krew. In 1988, Miller was musical director for Deon Estus, who was the opening act for several shows on George Michael's The Faith Tour.

Miller moved to Malibu, California, in 2006, where he started working as an independent producer on songs for various artists, including three unreleased remixes of Katy Perry songs. In Malibu, Miller started the Rock Against Trafficking foundation to raise money and awareness to fight human trafficking. The mostly unreleased Rock Against Trafficking (RAT) album project, which was produced by Miller in 2014, is called Set Them Free, and features The Police and Sting covers performed by various well-known artists, such as members of the rock band Journey, Heart, Carlos Santana, Slash, Julian Lennon, Ellis Hall, and En Vogue. The RAT flagship song "Stand Up" is an original, co-written by Miller with artist AV!VA, and performed by AV!VA. "Roxanne", the first single from the Set Them Free album, which was performed by Glenn Hughes of Deep Purple, has been released on 11 January 2018.

Miller died on 5 May 2022 at the age of 62 in his home in Southern California.

== Partial production discography ==
Artist	Song	Album	Producer	Engineer	Mixer	Co-Writer
Nik Kershaw	Show Us (unreleased track)					check
Kylie Minogue	Celebration	Single	check			
Donna Summer	I Will Go With You (Con Te Partiró)"	Single	check	check	check	
Donna Summer	My Life	Live & More Encore				check
David Bowie	Everyone Says Hi	Heathens	check	check	check	
Bananarama	Full Album	Ultra Violet	check	check	check	check
Slash & Fergie	So Lonely	Set Them Free (Forthcoming)	check	check	check	
Lionel Richie	Angel	New Constellation		check	check	
Andrea Bocelli	L'incontro	Cieli di Toscana	check	check		
Freda Payne	"Band of Gold" (remix)	Single	check		check	
Katy Perry	California Gurls, E.T., Teenage Dream (remixes, unreleased)	Singles	check		check	
Boy George	Hare Krishna	U Can Never B2 Straight	check		check	
Rob Thomas	Message in a Bottle	Set Them Free	check	check	check	
Ellis Hall	If You Love Somebody Set Them Free, Let Your Soul Be Your Pilot	Set Them Free	check	check	check	
Sybil	Full Album	Still a Thrill	check	check	check	check
Hall & Oates	Mona Lisa's Eyes	Phunk Shui	check			
Gypsy Teens	Bamboleo, Club Tropicana	Gypsy Teens	check	check		
Stacy Francis	I Still Believe	Single	check	check	check	
Stacy Francis	Big Time	Single	check	check	check	check
Matt Goss		Forthcoming Album	check			check
Carlos Santana, Beto Cuevas	Fragile	Set Them Free	check	check	check	
Simply Red	You Make Me Feel Brand New	Home	check	check	check	
Destiny Rogers		Forthcoming Album	check	check	check	check
Bros	Love Can Make You Fly	Single	check	check	check	check
Wayland	Shape Of My Heart	Set Them Free	check	check	check	
Wayland		Forthcoming Single	check	check	check	
Jett Prescott		Forthcoming Album	check	check	check	check
Chayanne	Supermodel, Kiss it Goodbye	Singles	check		check	check
Steve Rogers		Forthcoming Album	check	check	check	check
Journey	Synchronicity II	Single	check	check	check	
Glenn Hughes	Roxanne	Single	check	check	check	
En Vogue	Brand New Day	Set Them Free	check	check	check	
Keb' Mo'	Russians	Set Them Free	check	check	check	
Andy Fraser	Every Breath You Take	Set Them Free	check	check	check	
Europe	The Final Countdown (remix)	Single			check	
David Austin & Tony Hadley	Grease	Single	check			
The Undertaker	The Man in Black	WrestleMania: The Album	check	check		check
AV!VA (aka Aviva Scott)		Forthcoming Album	check	check	check	check
Kim Se-hwang	We Need A Change	Forthcoming Album	check	check	check	
Kiss	I Was Made for Lovin' You (remix)	Single	check	check	check	
Dilana	Can't Stand Losing You	Set Them Free	check	check	check	
Billy Preston	Heroes	Single	check	check		
Village People	Y.M.C.A. (remix)	Single		check	check	
Simply Red	Perfect Love	Simplified	check	check	check	
Heart	Wrapped Around Your Finger	Set Them Free	check	check	check	
Jaki Graham	It's Too Late, Jack & Jill	Singles	check	check	check	check
Barry Manilow	Copacabana (remix)	Single	check	check	check	
Beth Hart	Sister Moon	Set Them Free	check	check	check	
Vanessa Amorosi	Absolutely Everybody	Single	check		check	
Marta Sánchez	Soy Yo	Soy Yo	check		check	
Paulina Rubio	I Was Made for Lovin' You	Border Girl	check		check	
Daneliya Tuleshova		Forthcoming Single	check	check	check	check
James Elvidge		Forthcoming Album	check	check	check	
AZNIV & Kodie Shane	Mr. Ego	Single	check	check	check	check
Ricky Rebel		Forthcoming Album	check	check	check	check
Meredith O'Connor, Mary Wilson, Rebecca Black, Ruggero Pasquarelli, Daneliya Tuleshova, Kodie Shane, Mackenzie Sol, Tenille Arts, Syndee Winters	You Are Not Alone	Single	check	check	check	
Rozalla	I Feel it Slipping Away	Single	check	check		
