= Josh Keaton =

American actor (born 1979)

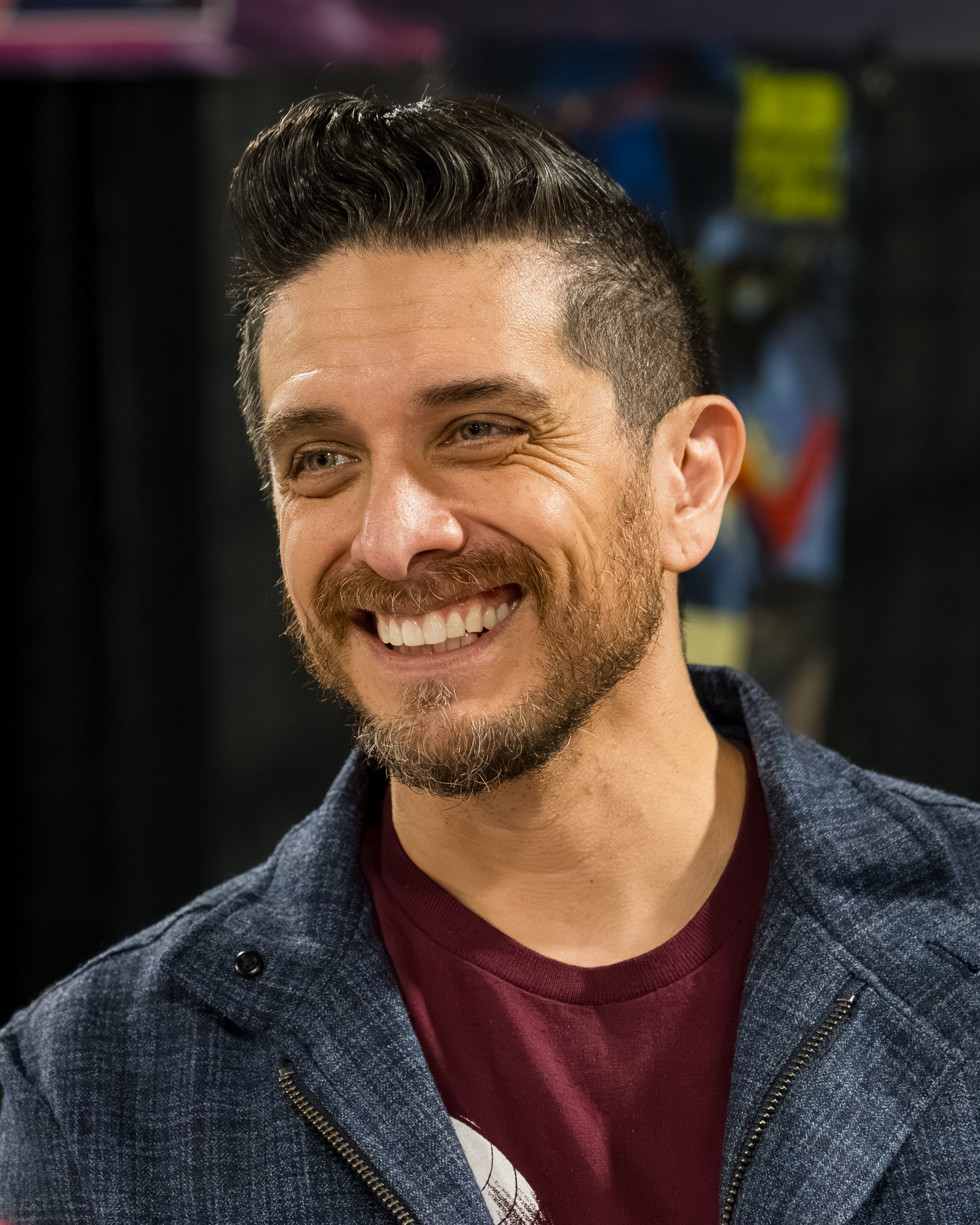
- Keaton at GalaxyCon Nashville in 2026
- Born: Joshua Luis Wiener; February 8, 1979 (age 47); Hacienda Heights, California, U.S.
- Other names: Joshua Wiener; Josh Wiener
- Occupation: Actor
- Years active: 1987–present
- Spouse: Elizabeth Melendez (m. 2009)
- Children: 2
- Musical career
- Genres: R&B; pop; dance
- Labels: Work; RCA; Epic
- Formerly of: No Authority
- Website: joshkeaton.com

Joshua Luis Wiener (born February 8, 1979), known professionally as Josh Keaton, is an American actor. He is known for his many voice roles, including Takashi "Shiro" Shirogane in Voltron: Legendary Defender, Spider-Man in various media in addition to Electro in the video game Marvel's Spider-Man, Jack Darby in Transformers: Prime, Captain America in X-Men '97 and What If...?, and the adolescent Hercules in Hercules. He was also the voice of Ryu Hayabusa in the console versions of Ninja Gaiden, and the voice of Revolver Ocelot in Metal Gear Solid 3: Snake Eater. He is also the voice of King Anduin Wrynn in the MMORPG World of Warcraft and Tyler in Pokémon Concierge.

== Early life ==
Keaton was born outside of Los Angeles in Hacienda Heights, California, on February 8, 1979, to a father from New York City, and a mother from Lima, Peru. He has three sisters: Danielle, Alitzah "Ali", and Sabrina. He is fluent in Spanish which he learned first as a child, and later English. As a child, he learned to speak some Quechua from his maternal grandparents. His father is Jewish and his mother is Catholic. Through his sister Ali, he is the brother-in-law of former Youngstown singer James Lee Dallas.

== Career ==
His career has included television, video game and film work, with a mixture of live acting and voice work for animations. As an infant, he appeared in an OshKosh B'gosh commercial. Then in 1990, he would appear in Kidsongs: A Day at Camp and his final Kidsongs appearance, Kidsongs: Ride The Roller Coaster. He was in the 1990s boy band No Authority and was signed to MJJ Music and later RCA Records as a solo artist.

Keaton voiced Jules Brown in Back to the Future: The Animated Series during 1991–1992 and Major Ocelot during Metal Gear Solid 3: Snake Eater and Metal Gear Solid: Portable Ops.

From 2008 to 2009, he voiced Peter Parker / Spider-Man in The Spectacular Spider-Man animated series on The CW. He was originally supposed to voice the character in the 2002 Spider-Man video game but his voice work was scrapped and reworked as Harry Osborn / Green Goblin when Tobey Maguire came on to voice the character. He also reprised the role of New Goblin in the 2007 video game Spider-Man: Friend or Foe, and Spider-Man again in several video games (Spider-Man: Shattered Dimensions, Marvel vs. Capcom 3 and Spider-Man: Edge of Time). From 2017 to 2020, Keaton provided the voice of several recurring characters in Marvel's Spider-Man on Disney XD. He would also portray the villain Max Dillon / Electro in the 2018 Spider-Man video game developed by Insomniac Games, providing both the physical motion capture and voice for the character.

In 2011, Keaton was the voice for Spyro the Dragon in the Skylanders reboot of the franchise, Jack Darby and Tailgate on Transformers: Prime, and Hal Jordan / Green Lantern in Green Lantern: The Animated Series.

Since 2012, he is the voice for Anduin Wrynn in the video games World of Warcraft and Heroes of the Storm.

At Wondercon 2016, it was announced that Keaton would play Takashi "Shiro" Shirogane, one of the main characters of the Voltron animated series Voltron: Legendary Defender that premiered on June 10, exclusively on Netflix.

== Filmography ==
=== Voice acting ===
==== Films ====
List of voice performances in film
Year	Title	Role	Notes	Source
1993	Recycle Rex	Additional voices		
1997	Hercules	Young Hercules (speaking voice)		
2004	Kangaroo Jack: G'Day U.S.A.!	Charlie Carbone	Direct-to-video	
2006	The Wild	Additional voices		
2010	Justice League: Crisis on Two Earths	Wally West	Direct-to-video	
2010	Superman/Shazam!: The Return of Black Adam	Punk	Direct-to-video	
2012	Winx Club: The Secret of the Lost Kingdom	King Oritel of Domino	Nickelodeon dub	
2013	Winx Club 3D: Magical Adventure	King Oritel of Domino	Nickelodeon dub	
2013	VeggieTales: Merry Larry and the True Light of Christmas	The Voice in Space	Direct-to-video	
2015	Justice League: Gods and Monsters	Orion	Direct-to-video	
2015	Lego DC Comics Super Heroes: Justice League: Attack of the Legion of Doom	Hal Jordan / Green Lantern	Direct-to-video	
2015	The Laws of the Universe	Ray	English dub	
2016	DC Super Hero Girls: Hero of the Year	Hal Jordan / Green Lantern, Steve Trevor, Barry Allen / Flash	Direct-to-video	
2016	Lego DC Comics Super Heroes: Justice League – Cosmic Clash	Hal Jordan / Green Lantern	Direct-to-video	
2017	DC Super Hero Girls: Intergalactic Games	Steve Trevor, Barry Allen / Flash	Direct-to-video	
2017	Lego Scooby-Doo! Blowout Beach Bash	Tommie, Chad	Direct-to-video	
2017	Lego DC Super Hero Girls: Brain Drain	Barry Allen / Flash	Direct-to-video	
2018	Lego DC Super Hero Girls: Super-Villain High	Barry Allen / Flash	Direct-to-video	
2018	DC Super Hero Girls: Legends of Atlantis	Barry Allen / Flash	Direct-to-video	
2019	Birds of a Feather	Manou		
2019	Jake and Kyle Get Wedding Dates	Jake Westen	Direct-to-video	
2019	Lego DC Batman: Family Matters	Board Member	Direct-to-video	
2020	Lego DC Shazam! Magic and Monsters	Executive, Terrance	Direct-to-video	
2020	Ben 10 Versus the Universe: The Movie	XLR8		
2021	Batman: Soul of the Dragon	Jeffrey Burr	Direct-to-video	
2023	Suzume	Sōta Munakata	English dub	
2023	Spider-Man: Across the Spider-Verse	Peter Parker / Spider-Man (Earth-26496)	Reprises role as Spider-Man from The Spectacular Spider-Man	

==== Animated television ====
List of voice performances in animation
Year	Title	Role	Notes	Source
1990	New Kids on the Block	Albert	15 episodes	
1991	Captain Planet and the Planeteers	Pontus	Episode: "A World Below Us"	
1991	Snoopy's Reunion	Linus van Pelt	Television special	
1991	Peter Pan and the Pirates	Curly	18 episodes	
1991–1992	Back to the Future	Jules Brown	25 episodes	
1992	Batman: The Animated Series	Young Michael Stromwell	Episode: "It's Never Too Late"	
1998	Adventures from the Book of Virtues	Sean Willis, Sir Roland	Episode: "Trustworthiness"	
2005	The Grim Adventures of Billy & Mandy	Driver, Zombie #2, Vendor	Episode: "Jeffy's Web/Irwin Gets a Clue"	
2005–2006	Bratz	Eitan	13 episodes	
2007	Ben 10	Tim Dean, Hector, Kid #2	2 episodes	
2007–2011	The Path of Atticus	Atticus		
2008–2009	The Spectacular Spider-Man	Peter Parker / Spider-Man	26 episodes	
2010	Firebreather	Troy Adams	Television film	
2010–2013	Transformers: Prime	Jack Darby, Tailgate, additional voices	45 episodes	
2011	Sym-Bionic Titan	Ian	Episode: "Disenfranchised"	
2011	The Super Hero Squad Show	Moon-Boy	Episode: "The Devil Dinosaur You Say!"	
2011–2014	Winx Club	Valtor, Duman, King Oritel	Nickelodeon dub	
2011–2013	Green Lantern: The Animated Series	Hal Jordan / Green Lantern	26 episodes	
2012	Scooby-Doo! Spooky Games	Steve Lookers		
2012; 2019; 2021	Young Justice	Black Spider, Wilheim Vittings	5 episodes	
2013	Hero Factory	William Furno	Episode: "Brain Attack"	1 episode
2013	Regular Show	Auto T	Episode: "The Thanksgiving Special"	
2013	Scooby-Doo! and the Spooky Scarecrow	Levi	Television special	
2013	Doc McStuffins	Johnny Foosball	Episode: "You Foose, You Lose"	2 episodes
2015	Justice League: Gods and Monsters Chronicles	White House Aide, Kobra Guard	2 episodes	
2015	The Mr. Peabody & Sherman Show	Wilbur Wright	Episode: "Wright Brothers"	
2015–2017	DC Super Hero Girls	Hal Jordan, Barry Allen, Steve Trevor		
2015–2017	Be Cool, Scooby-Doo!	Additional Voices	5 episodes	
2016–2024	Kulipari	Darel	13 episodes	
2016–2018	Voltron: Legendary Defender	Takashi "Shiro" Shirogane	69 episodes	
2016–2018	Justice League Action	Hal Jordan / Green Lantern		
2017	Ant-Man	Scott Lang / Ant-Man	6 episodes	
2017–2021	Ben 10	XLR8, SixSix, Acid Breath, various voices	33 episodes	
2017–2020	Stretch Armstrong and the Flex Fighters	Gabe, Kyle, Ben Leonard, Navy Officer, Actor, Gabe-Farious		
2017–2020	Spider-Man	Norman Osborn / Dark Goblin / Spider-King, John Jameson, Ollie Osnick / Steel Spider, additional voices	17 episodes	
2017–2020	Elena of Avalor	Miguel, Andres	4 episodes	
2017–2018	Avengers Assemble	Scott Lang / Ant-Man	13 episodes	
2018	Guardians of the Galaxy	Scott Lang / Ant-Man	Episode: "Back in the New York Groove"	
2018–2020	The Epic Tales of Captain Underpants	Additional voices	Uncredited	
2019	Trolls: The Beat Goes On!	Mr. Glittercakes, Thistle McCall	2 episodes	
2020–2022	It's Pony	Heston	Secondary voice role	
2021	Dota: Dragon's Blood	Bram	Netflix series	
2021–2024	What If...?	Steve Rogers / Captain America / Hydra Stomper	Recurring role; 7 episodes	
2021–2024	Arcane	Deckard, Salo, Customs Agent, Gorgeous Man	11 episodes	
2022	Dragon Age: Absolution	Rezaren, Tevinter Mage	6 episodes	
2022	Tales of the Jedi	Senator Dagonet's Son	Episode: "Justice"	
2023	Moon Girl and Devil Dinosaur	Syphon8er, Angelo, Additional voices	2 episodes	
2023	Pokémon Concierge	Tyler	4 episodes	
2024	Spectacular Spider-Man Blue	Peter Parker / Spider-Man (Earth-26496)	Fan film; reprises role as Spider-Man from The Spectacular Spider-Man	
2024	Invincible	Agent Spider, Jogger	Episode: "I Thought You Were Stronger"	
2024	Ranma ½	Dr. Tofu Ono	English dub, 2024 remake	
2024	Batman: Caped Crusader	Matthew Thorne	1 episode	
2024–2025	Hot Wheels Let's Race	Axle Spoiler	20 episodes	
2024–2026	X-Men '97	Steve Rogers / Captain America	3 episodes	
2025–present	Your Friendly Neighborhood Spider-Man	Richard Parker, Eddie Brock	2 episodes	

==== Video games ====
List of voice performances in video games
Year	Title	Role	Notes	Source
1997	Disney's Animated Storybook: Hercules	Young Hercules		
2002	Spider-Man	Harry Osborn		
2003	Brother Bear	Kenai		
2004	Onimusha 3: Demon Siege	Ranmaru Mori		
2004	Spider-Man 2	Harry Osborn		
2004	Shellshock: Nam '67	Tick Tock		
2004	Metal Gear Solid 3: Snake Eater	Major Ocelot		
2005	Area 51	Crispy		
2005	Psychonauts	Lungfish Zealot, Dingo Inflagrante, Matador		
2005	X-Men Legends II: Rise of Apocalypse	Cyclops		
2005	SOCOM U.S. Navy SEALs: Fireteam Bravo	LONESTAR		
2006	Naruto: Clash of Ninja 2	Mizuki		
2006	Age of Empires III: The WarChiefs	Chayton Black		
2006	Marvel: Ultimate Alliance	Human Torch		
2006	Need for Speed: Carbon	Sal Mustella	Shared with Elias Toufexis	
2006	SOCOM U.S. Navy SEALs: Fireteam Bravo 2	LONESTAR		
2006	Metal Gear Solid: Portable Ops	Major Ocelot		
2007	Lost Planet: Extreme Condition	Wayne		
2007	God of War II	Young Spartan		
2007	Spider-Man 3	Apocalypse Thugs		
2007	Spider-Man: Friend or Foe	Harry Osborn / New Goblin		
2008	No More Heroes	Destroyman		
2008	Ninja Gaiden II	Ryu Hayabusa		
2009	Leisure Suit Larry: Box Office Bust	Larry Lovage		
2009	Terminator Salvation	Resistance Soldiers		
2009	Cloudy with a Chance of Meatballs	Brent McHale		
2009	Ninja Gaiden Sigma 2	Ryu Hayabusa		
2009	Marvel Super Hero Squad	Spider-Man		
2009	Jak and Daxter: The Lost Frontier	Jak		
2010	No More Heroes 2: Desperate Struggle	New Destroyman		
2010	StarCraft II: Wings of Liberty	Valerian Mengsk		
2010	Kingdom Hearts Birth by Sleep	Young Hercules		
2010	Spider-Man: Shattered Dimensions	Peter Parker / Ultimate Spider-Man	Voiced Amazing Spider-Man in the Nintendo DS version	
2010	Splatterhouse	Rick Taylor		
2010	Marvel Super Hero Squad: The Infinity Gauntlet	Spider-Man		
2011	Marvel vs. Capcom 3: Fate of Two Worlds	Peter Parker / Spider-Man		
2011	Spider-Man: Edge of Time	Peter Parker / Spider-Man Future Peter Parker / CEO of Alchemax		
2011	Skylanders: Spyro's Adventure	Spyro the Dragon		
2011	Ultimate Marvel vs. Capcom 3	Peter Parker / Spider-Man		
2011	Star Wars: The Old Republic	Additional Voices		
2012	Skylanders: Giants	Spyro the Dragon		
2012	PlayStation All-Stars Battle Royale	Jak		
2012	World of Warcraft: Mists of Pandaria	Prince Anduin Wrynn		
2012	Transformers: Prime – The Game	Jack Darby, Vehicon Car, Vehicon Jet		
2012	The Amazing Spider-Man	Peter Parker / Spider-Man	Reused voice grunts from the Beenox versions of Spider-Man: Edge of Time	
2013	StarCraft II: Heart of the Swarm	Valerian Mengsk		
2013	Marvel Heroes	Captain Marvel		
2013	The Last of Us	Additional Voices		
2013	Batman: Arkham Origins	Dick Grayson / Robin		
2013	Skylanders: Swap Force	Spyro the Dragon		
2013	Knack	Lucas		
2014	Lightning Returns: Final Fantasy XIII	Additional Voices		
2014	Skylanders: Trap Team	Spyro the Dragon, Spry, Knight Light		
2014	Call of Duty: Advanced Warfare	Additional Voices		
2014	Lego Batman 3: Beyond Gotham	Hal Jordan / Green Lantern, Billy Batson / Shazam, Dick Grayson / Nightwing, Kyle Rayner / White Lantern		
2015	Battlefield Hardline	Firework Guy, Deceased ATF Agent, Outcome Agent		
2015	Infinite Crisis	Aquaman		
2015	Lego Jurassic World	Billy Brennan		
2015	Mad Max	Jeet, Additional voices		
2015	Skylanders: SuperChargers	Spyro the Dragon, Spry, Knight Light		
2015	Lego Dimensions	Gamer Kid		
2016	King's Quest	Young King Graham		
2016	World of Warcraft: Legion	King Anduin Wrynn		
2016	Skylanders: Imaginators	Spry, Knight Light	Uncredited	
2016	World of Final Fantasy	Lann		
2016	Star Ocean: Integrity and Faithlessness	Tiffan Delacroix		
2016	Final Fantasy XV	Talcott Hester (Teen)		
2016	Let It Die	Meijin		
2017	Horizon Zero Dawn	Sun King Avad		
2017	Knack II	Lucas		
2017	Prey	Additional Voices		
2017	DreamWorks Voltron VR Chronicles	Shiro		
2018	World of Warcraft: Battle for Azeroth	King Anduin Wrynn		
2018	Marvel's Spider-Man	Max Dillon / Electro		
2018	Lego DC Super-Villains	Hal Jordan / Green Lantern, Blue Beetle		
2018	Adventure Time: Pirates of the Enchiridion	Flame Guard #1, Flame Person #3, Mushroom Person #1, Marauder #3		
2019	Heroes of the Storm	Anduin Wrynn		
2019	Marvel Ultimate Alliance 3: The Black Order	Scott Lang / Ant-Man		
2019	Death Stranding	Junk Dealer		
2020	Final Fantasy VII Remake	Narjin		
2020	Marvel's Iron Man VR	Tony Stark / Iron Man		
2020	World of Warcraft: Shadowlands	King Anduin Wrynn		
2021	No More Heroes III	Destroyman True Face, Mass Production Destroyman, Mysterious Man		
2021	Psychonauts 2	Nurse Cherry, Germ Guy, Hardhat Germ, Muscle Man, Knight		
2022	Horizon Forbidden West	Sun King Avad		
2022	Apex Legends Mobile	Fade		
2022	Star Ocean: The Divine Force	Additional voices		
2022	Marvel's Midnight Suns	Tony Stark / Iron Man		
2023	Justice League: Cosmic Chaos	Flash, Skeets, Alex		
2023	Star Trek: Resurgence	Petty Officer Carter Diaz		
2024	Like a Dragon: Infinite Wealth	Additional voices		
2024	Batman: Arkham Shadow	Dick Grayson / Projection Room Rat		
2024	Marvel Rivals	Tony Stark / Iron Man		
2024	Teenage Mutant Ninja Turtles: Mutants Unleashed	Ray Fillet		
2025	Like a Dragon: Pirate Yakuza in Hawaii	Rodriguez		
2025	Rusty Rabbit	Astley		
2025	Metal Gear Solid Delta: Snake Eater	Major Ocelot	Reused audio tracks from the original release of Metal Gear Solid 3: Snake Eater	
2025	Marvel Cosmic Invasion	Iron Man, Spider-Man, Beetle		
2025	Dune Awakening	Dax Reyder, Mobula Gang Member #1, Ambrose Lucifera		
2026	Marvel Tōkon: Fighting Souls	Spider-Man, Iron Man, Gabe	English dub	
2026	Invincible VS	Agent Spider		
2026	Grand Theft Auto VI	The Local Population		

=== Audio books ===
Year	Title	Role
2015	Rain of the Ghosts	Tommy McMinn, Chris LeVell

=== Live-action ===
==== Films ====
List of acting performances in film
Year	Title	Role	Notes	Source
1989–1990	Kidsongs	Himself	Videos: "A Day at Camp" "Ride the Roller Coaster"	
1991	All I Want for Christmas	Brad		
1992	Newsies	Newsboy		
1996	Same River Twice	Andy		
1996	Judge and Jury	Boy #2		
1996	Infinity	David		
1997	Just Write	Teenager on Trolley		
1998	The Souler Opposite	Young Barry		
1999	Chimera House	Roy		
2003	The Even Stevens Movie	Mootai / Jason		
2007	Up-In-Down Town	Billy		

==== Television ====
List of acting performances in television
Year	Title	Role	Notes	Source
1987	I'm Telling!	Himself	Contestant	
1993	Dr. Quinn, Medicine Woman	First Male Cousin	2 episodes	
1994	Someone Like Me	Doug	Episode: "El Presidente"	
1994	Boy Meets World	Boy #2, Roy	2 episodes	
1995	Sister, Sister	Franklin	Episode: "It's a Party Thang"	
1995–1996	The Secret World of Alex Mack	Bryce	Recurring role	
1996	Saved by the Bell: The New Class	Glee Club #2	Episode: "Fire at the Max: Part 1"	
1997	Chicago Hope	Will Peters	Episode: "The Son Also Rises"	
1997	Baywatch	Todd Rose	Episode: "Rendezvous"	
1997	General Hospital	Tim	Recurring role	
1997	Step by Step	Will Peters	Episode: "Just Say Maybe"	
1999	Touched by an Angel	Young Nick Stratton	Episode: "Made in the U.S.A."	
1999	A Murder on Shadow Mountain	Young Denny	Television film	
1999–2002	The Young and the Restless	Brendon	Recurring role 10 episodes	
2002	Boston Public	Martin Andrews	Episode: "Chapter Thirty-Four"	
2002	ER	Greg	Episode: "Tell Me Where It Hurts"	
2004	Will & Grace	Salvatore	2 episodes	
2006	Bones	Yasutani the Terrible	Episode: "The Superhero in the Alley"	
2014	Scorpion	Phil Daniels	Episode: "True Colors"	

Preceded by Neil Patrick Harris	Voice or portrayal of Spider-Man; 2008–2012	Succeeded by Drake Bell
Preceded by Elijah Wood	Voice of Spyro the Dragon; 2011–2018	Succeeded by Tom Kenny
