= Monster High (TV series) =

American CGI-animated TV series

- Genre: Comedy; Fantasy
- Based on: Monster High by Mattel
- Developed by: Shea Fontana
- Voices of: Gabrielle Nevaeh Green; Iris Menas; Courtney Lin; Tony Revolori; Kausar Mohammed; Valeria Rodriguez; Alexa Kahn; Alexander Polinsky; Debra Wilson
- Theme music composer: Kelsey Kovar; Ivan LaFever; Stefanie Robyn Fink; Glenda R. Proby; Jason W. Gleed; Michael Kotch; Paul Jason Robb
- Composer: Daniel Rojas
- Country of origin: United States
- Original language: English
- No. of seasons: 2
- No. of episodes: 46 (79 segments)

Production
- Executive producers: Christopher Keenan; Fred Soulie
- Running time: 11–22 minutes
- Production companies: Mattel Television; Nickelodeon Animation Studio

Original release
- Network: Nickelodeon
- Release: October 6, 2022 – October 24, 2024

Monster High is an American animated fantasy comedy television series based on the eponymous fashion doll franchise and its 2022 television film by Mattel and Mattel Television, respectively. It aired on Nickelodeon in the United States and globally from October 6, 2022, to October 24, 2024.

== Premise ==
The series follows Clawdeen Wolf, Draculaura, and Frankie Stein, as well as other children of famous mythical monsters, as they navigate the hilarity of high school in the hallowed halls of the eponymous Monster High.

== Cast ==
=== Main ===
- Gabrielle Nevaeh Green as Clawdeen Wolf, a 15-year old Afro-Latina werewolf-human hybrid, who is the daughter of a human father Apollo and a werewolf mother Selena. Unlike the movie, she discovered Monster High herself on her birthday instead of hearing of it beforehand. She is the leader of the Boo Crew.
- Courtney Lin as Draculaura, a Romanian-Taiwanese vampire and daughter of Dracula. She practices witchcraft, which is forbidden in the Monster World; unlike the movie where her magic was exposed and the students and staff accepted her.
  - Lin also voices Iris Clops, the daughter of the Cyclops, Moonalisa Lightpaw, the werecat and the ghost and she was the original were-ruler when she met Clawdeen, Yap, the blue-haired Werewolf pup and younger brother of Romulus and Blair, the human from the human world who used to bully Clawdeen and now she has become a monster hunter.
- Iris Menas as Frankie Stein, the child of mad scientists Dr. and Dr. Stein, created using "the best and brightest minds in monster history". Unlike previous iterations, Frankie is non-binary and uses they/them pronouns.
  - Menas also voices Goobert, the slime-monster, and Whiskerene the elderly werewolf and she is the mayor of West Furham and the rightful new wereruler.
- Tony Revolori as Deuce Gorgon, the calm, cool son of Medusa Gorgon, and barista at the school's Coffin Bean.
- Kausar Mohammed as Cleo de Nile, the daughter of the mummy, and the school's queen bee.
  - Mohammed also voices Whiskerbeth the elderly werewolf and she is the mayor of East Furham, and Raine, the human from the human world used to be bully Clawdeen and now she to be come a monster hunter.
- Valeria Rodriguez as Lagoona Blue, the Honduran daughter of a gill-man who knows little about the outside due to growing up in a sunken castillo.
  - Rodriguez also voices Spectra Vondergeist, the daughter of the Ghosts and Dr. C, the Cyclops is the Doctor of the Monster High.
- Alexa Kahn as Toralei Stripe, the English-Australian daughter of Catarina the Werecat. She was formerly antagonistic and manipulative, until learning the truth of Clawdeen's mother. At the end of Season 1, she helps the Boo Crew defeat her mother Catarina and free Selena, and now lives with the Wolf family. She is also a musician and lead singer in her band The Hissfits.
  - Kahn also voices Mouscedes King, the daughter of the Rat King and the wererat, Karen Kraken, the Kraken and she is the mother of the baby Kraken, and Fuzz, the purple-haired Werewolf pup and younger brother of Romulus.
- Alexander Polinsky as Heath Burns, the son of Hades Burns and a male Fire Elemental.
  - Polinsky also voices of Heads Chef, the Cerberus as the chef of the Monster High.
- Debra Wilson as Headless Headmistress Bloodgood, the African-American daughter of the Headless Horseman, who is in charge of the students at Monster High.
  - Wilson also voices Mary Stein, the goblin mother of Frankie and the wife of Dr. Victor Stein.

=== Recurring ===
==== Students ====
- Sekai Murashige as Kuma, an onikuma (a bear Yōkai).
- Felicia Day as Ghoulia Yelps, the daughter of a Canadian zombie couple, who is a gamer, and skilled skateboarder.
  - Day also voices Anxiety Monster, the brain monster.
- Darius Johnson as Barkimedes, the son of a werewolf and member of the Werewolf Pack.
  - Johnson also voices Skunkrates, the son of wereskunk and Pawl, a Werewolf pup and the twin brother of Pawla from Monster Middle School who befriended Mouscedes during Big Paw, Little Paw program.
- Scott Menville as Romulus, the son of a werewolf and leader of the Werewolf Pack and the older brother of Buzz, Yap and Fur-Edrick.
  - Menville also voices Buddy, a human from the real world who is befriend of Barkimedes in human disguise.
- Cole Massie as Finnegan Wake, a merman who is the son of a Mermaid and the cousin of Lagoona who moves around land in a wheelchair.
- Victoria T. Washington as Howleen Wolf, a werewolf who is member of the Werewolf Pack. Unlike her counterpart from the original Monster High, Howleen isn't related to Clawdeen or Clawd at all, due to being a full werewolf.
- Jordan Coleman as Manny Taur, the son of the Minotaur and Draculaura's former rival now friend.
  - Coleman also voices Sugar Rush Bandit the Raccoon.
- Jonathan Melo as Clawd Wolf, the long-lost older brother of Clawdeen.
  - Melo also voices Fur-Edrick, the red-haired werewolf pup and the younger brother of Romulus.
- Aishwarya Pillai as Abbey Bominable, the Nepalese daughter of a yeti from Mount Neverest and Heath's love interest.
- Kayla Cromer as Twyla Boogeyman, the shy daughter of the Boogeyman. Unlike the original, Twyla is autistic.
- Riki Lindhome and Kate Micucci as Purrsephone and Meowlody respectively, the twin daughters of the Werecat, and Toralei's best friends and cousins.
- Miles Brown as Gillington "Gil" Webber, the son of the fresh water monster, and Lagoona's crush.
- Josh Pinkowski as Lochlan Ness, the Scottish son of the Loch Ness Monster and the cousin of Gill.
- Jessica Darrow as Skelita Calaveras, the Latina skeleton and the daughter of Los Esqueletos.
  - Darrow also voices Abuela Calaveras, the skeleton grandmother of Skelita.
- Anna Cathcart as Jinafire Long, the Chinese daughter of the Chinese Dragon.
- Rutina Wesley as Venus McFlytrap, the African-American daughter of the Plant Monster from Boo York.
- Amber Riley as Catty Noir, the African-American daughter of the black werecat and a pop star from Boo York.
- Andy Pessoa as Wailon, the Australian son of the Ghost and Lagoona's ex-boyfriend.

==== School Staff ====
- Salli Saffioti as Mrs. O'Shriek, the banshee teacher of Monster High. Salli is/was the only returning voice artist from the original Monster High and originally voiced Clawdeen and Cleo.
  - Saffioti also provides the voice of the school's Skulette P.A. System and Pawla, a Werewolf pup and the twin sister of Pawl from Monster Middle School who befriended Barkimedes during Big Paw, Little Paw program.
- Sunil Malhotra as Mr. Mothmanson, the Mothman teacher of Monster High.
  - Malhotra also provides the voice of Dustin, the Night Terror into the Dust Bunny that becomes Twyla's pet.
- Iris Bahr as Ms. Ziz, a mythical Jewish bird and faculty members at Monster High.
- Phil LaMarr as Mr. Klopman, a golem who has protection powers and teacher and coach of Monster High.
  - LaMarr also voices of Bearon, the Werebear and the Baron of the Wereruler.
- Tamara Podemski as Coach Thunderbird, the thunderbird teacher and coach of Monster High.
- Ólafur Darri Ólafsson as Foxford, the Werefox who is the Assistant to the Were-ruler.

==== Relatives ====
- Ken Marino as Count Dracula, the father of Draculaura and the ex-husband of Wei Fang.
- Lauren Gaw as Wei Fang, the Taiwanese vampire mother of Draculaura and the ex-wife of Count Dracula.
- Delbert Hunt as Apollo Wolf, the African-American human father of Clawdeen and Clawd and the husband of Selena.
- Kate del Castillo as Selena Wolf, the Latina werewolf mother of Clawdeen and Clawd and the wife of Apollo.
- Devika Parikh as Ms. Tundra Bominable, the yeti mother of Abbey.
- Rhea Seehorn as Medusa Gorgon, the mother of Deuce and the wife of Lyra.
- Mary Jane Wells as Catarina Stripe, the werecat mother of Toralei & the former were ruler.
- Jessie Hendricks as Lyra, the Harpy wife of Medusa and the stepmother of Deuce.
- America Young and Debi Derryberry as Eurayle and Stheno Gorgon respectively, the twin sisters and the daughters of Medusa, stepdaughters of Lyra and the older sisters of Deuce. America and Debi have returned from the original Monster High and used to play Draculaura, Toralei, Purrsephone, Meowlody and Howleen, respectively.
- Krystina Alabado as Nefera de Nile, the older sister of Cleo and a Monster High alumni.
- Vishesh Chachra as Baba de Nile, the Mummy father of Cleo and Nefera and the husband of Mummy de Nile.
  - Chachra also provides the voice of Dr. Victor Stein, the zombie father of Frankie and the husband of Mary Stein.
- Artemis Pebdani as Mummy de Nile, the Mummy mother of Cleo and Nefera and the wife of Baba de Nile.

=== Guest ===
- Trixie Mattel as Skelly Vonderbone, the skeleton famous singer and Monster High alumni.
- Matthew Waterson as Witchcraft Codex, a spell book gifted to Draculaura by Clawdeen.
- Jenny Yokobori as Gakaiju, a Godzilla-resembling kaiju.
- Andrew Kishino as Modirah, another Japanese kaiju.
- Wayne Knight as Ralph, a human from the real world who is a monster researcher and the Wolf family's neighbor.
- Michael Beattie as Mer-Dad, the Merman father of Finnegan and the husband of Mer-Mom.
- Erin Anderson as Mer-Mom, the Mermaid Mother of Finnegan and the wife of Mer-Dad.
- John O'Hurley as Hades Burns, the greek god of the Underworld and Heath Burns' father. He is the former president and CEO of Underworld, Inc., and Lord of the Underworld.
- Nisa Ward as Autumn Patch, the Pumpkin Monster and the DJ of Monster High for Monster Ball.
- Cristina Pucelli as Superintendent Slugerson, the Slug monster superintendent of Monster High.
- ViviAnn Yee as Yi-Ling, a human from the real world who befriended Draculaura at Witchcraft camp
- Sofia Sanchez as Bunny Earickson, a Werebunny from Monster Middle School who befriended Clawdeen during Big Paw, Little Paw program, she has Down syndrome.
- Carla Tassara as Hisstina, a Werekitten from Monster Middle School who befriended Toralei during Big Paw, Little Paw program.
- Carol Kane as Ghoulma Vondergeist, the Ghost grandmother of Spectra.
- Josh Keaton as Skeeter Vellman, the human the TV-famous ghost hunter who hired Blair and Raine to hunt the monsters down.
- Winnie Harlow as Dr. Alcott, a human from the human world of Library who help Clawdeen and Clawd to fixed Witchcraft Codex and Clawdeen's friend.
- John Waters as Scarecrow Von Twolegs aka Treat, a witchcraft-performing spider monster, one of the founders of Monster Fest, and is the "good" twin brother of Trick. Treat gains power by giving out goodies and making monsters happy. His motto is, "Weave your own web". He's about being true to yourself.
- Paul F. Tompkins as Trick, another witchcraft-performing spider monster, another one of the founders of Monster Fest, and is the "evil" twin brother of Treat. Trick gains power by tricking monsters and pulling pranks. His motto is, "Don't wiggle the web". He tries to trick everyone into being the same.
- Dominique Jackson as Phoenix, the phoenix famous singer of Monster High for Monster Fest.
- Samba Schutte as Hemming, a Werewhale that can shape shift into anyone, he disguised himself as Foxford, and later several other monsters. He disguised himself as Headmistress Bloodgood, whom he’s imprisoned in an alternate dimension until he was discovered and his secretly identity has been revealed as his true form since he was lonely and he was trying to make friends, Clawdeen has giving him her Necklace MoonClaw as a gift and he transformed into the friendly Werepolar bear to become the new student of Monster High.

== Episodes ==
=== Series overview ===
Season	Segments	Episodes	Originally released	
Season	Segments	Episodes	First released	Last released
1	45	26	October 6, 2022	December 8, 2023
2	34	20	March 11, 2024	October 24, 2024

=== Season 1 (2022–23) ===
No. overall	No. in season	Title	Written by	Storyboard by	Original release date	Prod. code	U.S. viewers (millions)
1	1	"The Monstering"	Shea Fontana	Yujin Lee & Kaela Lash, Nick Bachman & Matt Whitlock (directors)	October 28, 2022	101	0.19
We are introduced to 15-year old girl and monster expert Clawdeen as she introduces us to her world. She has a love and admiration for monsters since she was a child and wishes to prove they exist, but due to this, the other humans her age make fun of her, so she doesn't have friends. Her mother disappeared 10 years ago, now Clawdeen lives with her father and her pet dog. On her birthday, Clawdeen is reading about Onikuma, bear-like monsters with the ability to throw rocks but can be subdued by tickling them to her pet dog, scaring him. She is greeted by her father, who explains that he had to come home due to one minor lab explosion, causing them to wrap their research for the day. Before Clawdeen leaves, she receives her mother's necklace - The Moonclaw Necklace - from her father. At first, it turns out to be a normal necklace, but when Clawdeen enters the cemetery, the necklace comes to life and guides her to a hidden school called Monster High. She gets caught by Headless Headmistress Bloodgood and is kicked out for not being a monster. This occurs a lot when her other disguises fail. Monster High students Draculaura, Frankie, and Deuce befriend Clawdeen and help her find her inner monster. When Clawdeen, Draculaura, Frankie, and Deuce see Monster High getting invaded by what appears to be a normal bear as it grabs Deuce, Clawdeen trusts her instincts and reveals herself to be a werewolf as helpful as there can be to take on the bear, amazing everyone and disgusting Toralei to the point she storms off in a huff. Clawdeen uses her new werewolf abilities to rescue Deuce and subdue the bear which turns out to be an Onikuma due to the fact that it throws large rocks when threatened. Headless Headmistress Bloodgood accepts Clawdeen and the Onikuma into Monster High where a DNA test reveals that Clawdeen is 50% werewolf. Clawdeen's father is shown to know Headless Headmistress Bloodgood as he receives a letter from a messenger dragon and asks it to keep an eye on Clawdeen, allowing Clawdeen to finally start living her life out loud.
2	2	"Food Fight"	Shea Fontana	Kaela Lash & Jack McGee, Nick Bachman (director)	October 6, 2022	102	0.21
2	2	"Unfinished Brain-ness"	Lila Scott	Roan Helfer, Ashlyn Anstee (director)	October 6, 2022	102	0.21
"Food Fight": Draculaura, after hearing Lagoona and Toralei have a conversation about Clawdeen, practices witchcraft inside her room, in which is forbidden at Monster High, to cast a spell during her assignment. However, she accidentally brings her tater tot to life and it is on the loose. She asks Clawdeen and Frankie for help to catch that living tater tot and stop the evil food army before her dad, Dracula, arrives for a visit and Toralei exposes Draculaura's secret. "Unfinished Brain-ness": Frankie is cursed with bad luck when they remember the past that is inside their brain. In order to break the curse, they get help from Clawdeen and Draculaura and find out what went wrong in the past. Note: This episode aired as a sneak peek after Monster High: The Movie.
3	3	"Case of the Moondays"	Leah Longoria	Fred Gonzales, Broni Likomanov (director)	November 4, 2022	103	0.28
3	3	"Portrait of a Monster"	Mae Catt	Jack McGee, Broni Likomanov (director)	November 4, 2022	103	0.28
"Case of the Moondays": Clawdeen is worried that she will permanently turn back into human when the full moon hits. She gets tricked into going past the school's veil when she has some consultation from the local werewolf students Romulus and Barkimedes. Now, Clawdeen must find a way to save Cleo and herself from being seen by monster hunters, by embracing her human side. "Portrait of a Monster": It's Picture Day at Monster High, and Frankie is panicking about getting their picture taken. In a fit of anxiety, they accidentally ruin Cleo's picture (Thus making her cry) and zap the school camera, sending it on a rampage as it sucks up every monster in sight. Frankie is the only monster left and they must save everyone (Except Cleo, much to her annoyance) from the menace of the camera.
4	4	"Witch Hitch"	Leah Longoria	Ariel Song & Cheyenne Curtis, Ashlyn Anstee (director)	November 28, 2022	104	0.14
4	4	"Part of the Pack"	Jordan Gershowitz	Jack McGee & Roan Everly, Ashlyn Anstee (director)	November 28, 2022	104	0.14
"Witch Hitch": Draculaura and Toralei compete for Head Fearleader of the Fearleading Squad. However, Toralei knows Draculaura is a witch and threatens to expose her secret unless Draculaura drops out, with Lagoona tagging along with Toralei. In order to stop Toralei, Clawdeen and Frankie help Draculaura cast a spell on her, but not before Draculaura learns that Lagoona has a secret of her own and she cannot let Toralei expose Lagoona's secret as well. "Part of the Pack": Clawdeen keeps shedding her werewolf hair and must figure out how to stop shedding. Then, she meets Romulus and Barkimedes again and she also meets a new member of the werewolf pack named Howleen. At first, Clawdeen is not interested in joining the pack after that previous prank from the werewolf boys, but then she changes her mind and must pass the tests on joining the pack. However, Clawdeen has a choice to make: Clawdeen has to help Draculaura and Frankie pass their presentation assignments or she will ditch them and join the werewolf pack. When Clawdeen chooses the latter, she soon realizes that it is another prank made by the werewolf boys and they want to steal her pendant on a full moon.
5	5	"That Thing You Deuce"	Phillip Walker	Ariel Song, Ashlyn Anstee (director)	November 29, 2022	105	0.10
5	5	"Werewolf Weekend"	Scott D. Peterson	Yujin Lee, Nick Bachman (director)	November 30, 2022	105	0.22
"That Thing You Deuce": Deuce participates in a fundraiser by selling rock candy and collect enough money in order to win a trophy like his mom did. Clawdeen, Frankie, and Draculaura have decided to help him make more rock candies to sell, but the ghouls are overworked, so they decide to take a break. To make things worse, Deuce's snakes turn him into a puppet, use him to make even more rock candies, and force him to accidentally turn the other students into rock candy statues. Now, he must find a way to turn them back to normal with the help of the ghouls, even if it means giving up the fundraiser. "Werewolf Weekend": Clawdeen and Cleo visit Clawdeen's father at Clawdeen's house for a weekend while Clawdeen is maintaining her human side. Cleo becomes so desperate into getting more views that will surpass Draculaura's views. She then escapes from Clawdeen's house to meet the humans in hopes to earn a lot of views. Soon after Cleo escapes, Clawdeen reveals her werewolf side to her father, which he knew she is half-werewolf all along, though he doesn't know what happened to Clawdeen's mom, who was pure werewolf, after they got married and she mysteriously vanished. Clawdeen now must stop Cleo from being revealed as a monster in front of the humans before the ghouls get in trouble.
6	6	"Paw-zzle Pieces"	Story by : Taneka Stotts; Teleplay by : Han-Yee Ling	Fred Gonzales & Jack McGee, Broni Likomanov (director)	December 1, 2022	106	0.16
Clawdeen and her father discover a book from Monster High that may be a clue about her mom's disappearance. Clawdeen, Frankie, and Draculaura go to a library and find a book that was overdue a decade ago. They then discover a puzzle that opens the gate where Clawdeen's necklace must be inserted. However, an unknown creature was unleashed revealing himself to be Clawdeen's brother, Clawd after recently stealing her pendant. To stop the Splitzies from destroying Monster High, the Wolf siblings sing a lullaby and put them all to a machine that will merge them back together. Headless Headmistress Bloodgood warns that opening the gate that's not on the blood moon eclipse will destroy not only Monster High, but the entire world. The monsters enjoy their time of their own at Monster High.
7	7	"Nightmare Nightmore"	Leah Longoria	Ariel Song, Fred Gonzales, Jack McGee, Katherine Hashimoto & Roan Everly, Ashlyn Anstee (director)	December 19, 2022	107	0.16
Draculaura plans to celebrate "Nightmore", a Holiday for monsters to have fun, but her witchcraft is disabled. She invites Clawdeen, Clawd, Frankie, Lagoona, and Heath to celebrate at an abandoned mansion where there is snow. When Clawdeen steps outside, she is buried in the snow and they all encounter a Yeti girl named Abbey Bominable, who they thought was an enemy at first. Abbey explains her story and the monsters decide that she should celebrate Nightmore with them, which Draculaura reluctantly accepts, however, she becomes jealous of Abbey when she begins talking and interacting with Clawdeen, Clawd, Frankie, Lagoona, and Heath instead of her, getting to the point where they end up having a snowball fight and Draculaura, thinking her friends are happy with Abbey instead of listening to the song she wrote, so she sits alone in the cabin's basement feeling upset. Abbey comforts her and the two girls make up. Frankie and the others stop their snowball fight when they get a call from Headless Headmistress Bloodgood who tells them that Abbey's mom, Tundra Bominable, is attacking Monster High in the search for Abbey. Draculaura, Abbey, and the rest use The Ghoul Mobile to leave the mountains and get low enough so Draculaura can teleport herself and the others back to Monster High. After reuniting Tundra with Abbey (Which ends badly), Draculaura and the rest, with the help of Headless Headmistress Bloodgood, convince Tundra, who doesn't want Abbey to study at Monster High, to give Abbey a chance to study at Monster High, and when it succeeds, everyone celebrates Nighmore at Monster High by performing the song written by Draculaura.
8	8	"Out of Step"	Jordan Gershowitz	Jojo Baptista & Miche Perez, Nick Bachman (director)	March 10, 2023	108	0.13
8	8	"Pyramid Scheme"	Han-Yee Ling	Fred Gonzales & Kyle Menke, Broni Likomanov (director)	March 10, 2023	108	0.13
"Out of Step": Draculaura is paired up with Clawd for the Monster High Dance-Off, and they need to follow the scroll's dancing steps to win the dance-off like the Boogeyman did. However, things get out of hand when Draculaura's vampness level keeps lowering every time she is being laughed at by Toralei and everyone else, which causes her to decompose. In order to stop decomposing and raise her vampness level high enough, she has to get Clawd to wear the enchanted dancing shoes in order to dance better. But suddenly, the shoes can't stop him from dancing, so Draculaura, Frankie, and Clawdeen must help him in order to stop dancing. "Pyramid Scheme": Cleo is hoping that she will get her lead role for the upcoming school play, but her sister, Nefera, came back from her trip to Scaris for a visit. Seeing that she doesn't want Nefera to take the lead role away from her like she did in the past, Cleo must go inside her family's ancient tomb and grab the Heart of Cleopatra necklace. While Clawdeen distracts Nefera, Cleo and Frankie went inside the ancient tomb. Suddenly, Frankie was kicked out because only the De Nile family may step into the tomb. Upon grabbing the necklace, however, Cleo activated a booby trap and put Nefera in danger. Now, Cleo must make a sacrifice in order to shut off the booby trap and save her own sister.
9	9	"What's Up, Watzie?"	Che Grayson	Roan Everly & Miche Perez, Ashlyn Anstee & Ariel Song (directors)	March 10, 2023	109	0.14
9	9	"So Familiar"	Phillip Walker	Jack McGee, Broni Likomanov (director)	March 10, 2023	109	0.14
"What's Up, Watzie?": While building a robot, Frankie and Watzie witnessed a calendar with the dragons picture, and Frankie noticed Watzie's dragon tail wiggling. Headless Headmistress Bloodgood explained to Frankie that it's the dragon migration, and all dragons must go to their natural habitat in order to migrate. However, Frankie doesn't want to let Watzie go, despite the fact that Watzie is part dragon. With the help of their ghoul friends, they are going to do everything they can in order to make him stay with them. Unfortunately, he is not satisfied with any of those activities. With no other choice, Frankie let him go so he can migrate with his fellow dragons for a long time. "So Familiar": Draculaura, Frankie, and Clawdeen came back from their school break, but they haven't done their homework for a while. And what's worse for Draculaura is that Count Fabulous, a little bat with manners, is babysitting her because he treats her like a "baby bloodsucker". Clawdeen then shows her a witchcraft codex that can only be opened by true witches with their familiar. The ghouls must find Draculaura's familiar, a cat, so they can open the book for her to cast a spell that will help them finish their homework before the deadline. However, if they don't find her familiar in time, the book will self-destruct and Draculaura may never cast a spell like a true witch again.
10	10	"Crushed"	Lila Scott	Alysa Vilac & Conner Dow, Matt Whitlock (director)	March 17, 2023	110	0.18
10	10	"Over-Brotective"	Leah Longoria	Mike Tisserand & Tenaya Anue, Mike Tisserand & Nick Bachman (directors)	March 17, 2023	110	0.18
"Crushed": The tryouts for the Fearleading Squad has ended, and the following students were selected: Clawdeen, Clawd, Iris, and Kuma. Unfortunately, Frankie were not chosen for the Fearleading Squad, which makes them disappointed. Then, they followed Heath's advice to "bottle up their feelings", and they did, literally with their lightning in a bottle. But, during the Fearleading Squad showcase, Frankie tried to bottle up their feelings again until they accidentally cause a blackout. Now, they must follow Cleo's advice to let go of their feelings by crying their eyes out, and it worked. Now that they are calm enough, Frankie must save the Fearleading Squad showcase. "Over-Brotective": After his reunion with his dad, Clawd got an urgent phone call from Clawdeen and he met her in a secret hideout, which turns out that it's play time in the catacombs with Frankie, Draculaura, Lagoona, and Deuce. During their games, Clawd became overprotective with Clawdeen by trying to keep her safe, which irritates her. As they are playing a game of "Hide n Shriek", the Wolf siblings fell down to a trap where the Flying Venus Trap lives there. After many failed attempts, Clawdeen is fed up with Clawd overprotecting her just because he is technically one year older than her. However, they made amends with each other and found a way to get out of the Flying Venus Trap room to reunite with their friends.
11	11	"Horoscare"	Leanna Dindal	Fred Gonzales, Broni Likomanov (director)	March 24, 2023	111	0.18
11	11	"Flaunt Your Skeleton"	Mariko Tamaki	Yujin Lee, Mike Tisserand (director)	March 24, 2023	111	0.18
"Horoscare": Cleo becomes obsessed with a newly-installed app called "Horoscare" when she believes that her jewel idol, Pearl Ryuzaki, will arrive at Monster High. She gets Frankie to help her make a welcome party for Pearl, and they are starting to develop feelings for each other. Meanwhile, Toralei believes from the Horoscare that the humans might arrive, so she sets up a trap in front of Monster High. After making their final preparations for the welcome party, Cleo and Frankie stepped outside to welcome Pearl. But, they will have to get through Toralei and avoid her traps. Upon opening the gates, however, it may not be what Cleo is hoping for. "Flaunt Your Skeleton": Ghoulia is excited when her idol, Skelly Vonderbone, arrives at the auditorium to practice with the Boo Crew for their performance. However, when she was about to sing in front of Skelly, Ghoulia gets a case of "brain freeze", a symptom where zombies yell "brains" for whatever reason, and was humiliated. Frankie and Lagoona have decided to help Ghoulia conquer her fear, but it wasn't enough for Ghoulia to stop yelling "brains". When Ghoulia is about to quit, Skelly gives her a useful advice (or rather a secret code for her DDR video game) on how to conquer her fear by embracing her heart out, right before Ghoulia and the rest of the Boo Crew get to perform with Skelly.
12	12	"Creepover Party"	Jordan Gershowitz	Ariel Song, Ashlyn Anstee & Ariel Song (directors)	March 31, 2023	112	0.13
12	12	"Creature Clash"	Che Grayson	Tenaya Anue, Mike Tisserand (director)	March 31, 2023	112	0.13
"Creepover Party": Draculaura, Clawdeen, and Frankie are having trouble eating lunch at the table that was broken down. They tried to sit at the new lunch table, but Toralei beat them to it. The Boo Crew and Toralei made a bet that the Boo Crew must have a sleepover at the library, and if they leave before nightfall, Toralei wins. Later, they meet Twyla, an autistic boogey monster who hates loud noises, who shows Clawdeen a book that may be related to her moonclaw. But, Toralei watches from behind and tries to sabotage the sleepover with a stinkworm, which turns out to be a bookworm that eats books and grows. Now, the Boo Crew and Twyla must find a way to get rid of the bookworm. "Creature Clash": It's the scare-itage event at Monster High, and Frankie witnessed Kuma's scare-itage as he demonstrated what do the Onikumas do, such as lifting giant rocks. After the event, Frankie was interested and they would like to know more about the Onikumas. Kuma then explained to them about the Onikuma ritual, and as he left, Frankie have decided that they should do the ritual in order to surprise him. However, after the ritual was done, Frankie sees Ghoulia, Draculaura, Spectra, and the rest being possessed like zombies and causing havoc at Monster High. When Kuma returned, Frankie explained the mistake they made and they must find a way to turn the Boo Crew back to normal while Lagoona holds them off.
13	13	"Monster Movie"	Phillip Walker	Ariel Song, Roan Everly & Nazul Sobrino, Ashlyn Anstee & Ariel Song (directors)	April 7, 2023	113	0.16
13	13	"Earworm"	Mike Carrier	Ariel Song (also director)	April 7, 2023	113	0.16
"Monster Movie": Lagoona wanted to make a movie based on her real life, so she becomes a director for her movie with Draculaura playing as her and Deuce playing as the love of her life. However, the Boo Crew are requesting to make some changes for her movie, making Lagoona bite some of the furniture out of anger. After finishing the movie, Twyla talked to Lagoona about how she is feeling, which Lagoona explained that she has a case of the chomps, where her family once had an argument with each other and started chomping things. Now that she felt better thanks to Twyla, Lagoona must stand up to herself and fix her movie without chomping. "Earworm": Toralei is feeling jealous that nobody in Monster High wants to sit next to her during lunchtime. When she looked at the flier with all kinds of worms, Toralei became interested in the earworms and she has a devious plan to make the monsters like her. She and her cousins, Purrsephone and Meowlody, form a band called "The Hissfits" and performed a song while releasing the earworms Toralei stole to possess them and force them to like Toralei, which her cousins are feeling like she is using them. Things go awry, however, as Toralei is trying to get away from the possessed monsters who love her too much. With no other choice, she gets help from the Wolf siblings in order to remove the earworms.
14	14	"Spell the Beans"	Lila Scott	Aldin Baroza, Jack McGee & Fred Gonzales, Broni Likomanov (director)	October 2, 2023	114	0.14
Draculaura is having her bad day when she was late for her Fearleading practice, and to make things worse, her witchcraft potion was discovered outside Monster High. Headless Headmistress Bloodgood called the MPA, with Dracula as the leader of that organization, to go witch hunting, while Toralei is dead set on Draculaura's suspicions of being a witch. Meanwhile, Frankie and Deuce are searching for the Gorgon Talisman from his mom, and that may be a clue to bring back the Wolf siblings' mom. Elsewhere, the Wolf siblings are showing their dad Apollo, the only human who set foot at Monster High, a tour, while stopping their monster friends from eating him alive. When Toralei was about to tell Dracula the truth by bringing all kinds of witchcraft, Draculaura casts a spell on her, making the MPA think that Toralei is a witch and forcing Bloodgood to expel Toralei. Draculaura cannot hide her secret anymore and tells Dracula that she's the real witch, and he is disappointed in her. However, after a pep talk from Apollo, Dracula forgave Draculaura and lets her do what she wants. But, Bloodgood unleashed the Expel Beast and it will devour Toralei to completely expel her from Monster High. However, Dracula distracts Bloodgood and the MPA while Draculaura secretly casts a spell that will make them think that the ghost of the witch is casting the spell, and Deuce got the Gorgon Talisman back from the Expel Beast. Afterwards, Toralei has decided not to expose Draculaura's secret after saving her from being expelled, and the witch hunt came to an end. Before leaving, Dracula will see what he can do to change the rules in order to allow Draculaura to do witchcraft, for the better.
15	15	"Growing Ghoulia"	Mae Catt	Jack McGee, Broni Likomanov (director)	October 3, 2023	115	0.10
15	15	"Casketball Jinx"	Scott Peterson	Mike Jones & Yujin Lee, Mike Tisserand (director)	October 3, 2023	115	0.10
"Growing Ghoulia": Ghoulia was excited to become number one on the "Horror Roll" event, but then she was shocked that Draculaura became number one. However, Ghoulia has until Friday to catch up by doing her activities, until Draculaura beats her to it again and again. When she discovers that Draculaura did her witchcraft to stop time, Ghoulia buries herself to move ahead of her in time so that she can finally beat her. But then, multiples of Ghoulia clones are wreaking havoc at Monster High by simply yelling "points" and Draculaura found out that the real Ghoulia is behind all of this mess, though Draculaura felt bad about the way Ghoulia is feeling. Draculaura and Ghoulia must put aside their competition and find out how to turn everything back to normal. "Casketball Jinx": While practicing for the Casketball game, Clawdeen said the word "fun", which is taboo to all monsters and it jinxed the entire Casketball team, and made them lose the game afterwards. Clawdeen and Deuce went to the library for a book that summons the two Kaijus who are the best Casketball duo at Monster High. The Kaijus challenged the Casketball team to a game, and if the Casketball team wins, the jinx will be lifted. Meanwhile, Howleen gives Clawdeen a stone that can transfer their jinx to the Kaijus so the team can win. However, Clawdeen was against that idea, and although the Casketball team lost in the end, Clawdeen and her friends are going to teach the Kaijus that having fun is more important than being competitive.
16	16	"Cleo in the Kitchen"	Brandon Hoang	Tenaya Anue & Mike Tisserand (also director)	October 4, 2023	116	0.13
16	16	"Case of the Missing Squeak"	Mariko Tamaki	Alex York, Kai Dranchak & Roan Helfer, Ariel Song (director)	October 4, 2023	116	0.13
"Cleo in the Kitchen": Clawdeen is depressed that she cannot eat a homecooked meal at her house, which makes her homesick. Then, Cleo had an idea to make her feel better: She has to cook a homecooked meal, the Jambalaya, while having Draculaura distract Clawdeen until the food is ready. However, the Creepateria Chef went on a vacation, so Cleo cannot cook the meal on her own. She called for help from Heath, Frankie, Abbey, and even Clawd, but it ended up a disaster. With no other choice and with Clawdeen mad for hunger, Cleo called for help from the only monster who knows how to cook: Her own sister, Nefera. The De Nile sisters must cook a meal before a hangry Clawdeen eats Draculaura. "Case of the Missing Squeak": Lagoona failed the assignment to zombify a dead frog, so she went to class and took her squeaky toy for the extra credit exam proctored by Nefera. Lagoona was getting stressed out during the exam and tries to make herself feel better. But then, her squeaky toy, Señor Squeaky, is missing from her backpack, and starts interrogating her fellow monsters whom she thinks they stole it from her. However, none of them did it and she apologized, and Lagoona had to tell them about her missing Señor Squeaky, which was her secret. Then, they heard Cleo's scream, as she is being ambushed by Señor Squeaky, which was affected by the life essence potion that fell on Lagoona's backpack. Now, Lagoona, Frankie, Ghoulia, Manny and Spectra must get Señor Squeaky back before the exam time runs out.
17	17	"Pet Problems"	Phillip Walker	Fred Gonzales, Broni Likomanov (director)	October 10, 2023	117	0.16
17	17	"License to Rock"	Lee Schmit & Mike Carrier	Jack McGee & Katherine Hashimoto, Broni Likomanov (director)	October 10, 2023	117	0.16
"Pet Problems": Cleo asked her parents if she can have her own pet, which they eventually said "yes". Then, she showed Frankie and Deuce her new pet: a female cobra named "Hissette". Cleo tried to teach Hissette some tricks, but to no avail, even with the help of Frankie and Deuce. Then, Hissette went to the Catacombs from under Cleo's bed, and upon finding her, Cleo, Frankie, and Deuce encountered the Flying Venus Trap that was once encountered by the Wolf siblings. Now, they must figure out how to save Hissette from being eaten by the Flying Venus Trap, even if it means that Cleo must sacrifice a jewel that is precious to her. "License to Rock": Finnegan is practicing for his audition to become a band leader, but thanks to Clawdeen's advice, he is not sure if he is ready to perform like a band leader. Then, the audition has begun, with the Kraken as a judge. Clawd and Frankie performed with their own instruments and, despite the sabotage from Toralei, the Kraken is pleased with their performances. Then, it was Finnegan's turn, but then the Kraken went out on a rampage to Lagoona's room. The Boo Crew arrived to stop the Kraken by playing their instruments together, with the help of Mrs. O'Shriek with her saxophone and Toralei with her tambourine.
18	18	"Power Heist"	Leah Longoria	Katherine Hashimoto, Fred Gonzales, Mike Jones, Timothy Packford & Tom Sales, Matt Whitlock (director)	October 11, 2023	118	0.15
Toralei's mom, Catarina, arrives at Monster High as a substitute teacher to assign the students the talisman projects. She then paired Clawdeen and Toralei to work the Werewolf project together. At first, Clawdeen and Toralei don't trust one another, but then, Toralei understood how she felt when Clawdeen lost her mom, Selena Wolf, because Catarina did not bother to notice her ever since Catarina became the Wereruler after Selena's disappearance. After the Talisman projects, Catarina became interested in getting the Moonclaw Necklace from Clawdeen, so she had a devilish idea. She met Clawdeen once again and proposed a trade: The Moonclaw Necklace for the diary of Selena Wolf, which may hold the key to bringing her back. Clawdeen was unsure if she wanted to give up the necklace, but suddenly, Toralei arrived and she wanted to help her do the right thing, while she apologized for all the wrongdoings she had done. After arriving at the restaurant, Clawdeen gave Catarina a necklace. However, Catarina quickly finds out that the necklace is a fake and gets the diary burned to ashes, calling off the deal. As soon as Catarina left, it turns out that the diary that she burned was also a fake, and with the help of the Boo Crew, Toralei outwit her own mom by getting the real diary. The Boo Crew and Toralei make amends with one another as they walked out of the restaurant, in slow motion with the fire.
19	19	"Monster Midterms"	Phillip Walker	Roan Everly & Ariel Song (also director)	October 12, 2023	119	0.16
It's the Midterms at Monster High, and every monster is assigned differently by the "Midterm Fairy" (which is just a monster garbage can). However, aside from the Bloodmoon Eclipse that's coming soon, Clawdeen's biggest challenge is working together with the werewolf pack, Toralei and her cousins, a shy mouse girl Mouscedes King, and a skunk teenage boy Skunkrates (nicknamed "Teez"). The assignment for the werecreatures is to get the diamond from the monstrous cave, and Clawdeen was chosen as the leader, which is not an easy task for her. Meanwhile, Draculaura passed her Midterm early and is trying to make a Vampire Talisman with witchcraft. She is embarrassed when Dracula's attempts to help ended in a disaster. Elsewhere, as the werecreatures arrived at the cave, Romulus insisted on going ahead, though he ended up caught with booby traps. Then, they encountered a golem guarding the diamond, but then they retreated after a failed attempt. Clawdeen was about to give up, but thanks to the support from Clawd, Clawdeen now realized that she must trust not only her instincts, but their instincts as well. The werecreatures tried fighting the golem again, and this time, they succeeded with Teez knocking the golem out with his skunk smell and they got the diamond. Although it was revealed that the diamond they retrieved was worthless, the werecreatures passed the Midterms, and Clawdeen does have what it takes to become the wereruler after her mom. Clawdeen celebrates with Draculaura, who succeeded into making a Vampire Talisman with Dracula's help, and Frankie, who also passed their Midterm by making a machine that makes zappuccinos.
20	20	"Furmergency"	Han-Yee Ling	Fred Gonzales & Mike Jones, Broni Likomanov (director)	October 16, 2023	120	0.15
20	20	"Boogey Nightmare"	Leanna Dindal	Talia Ellis, Mike Tisserand (also director)	October 16, 2023	120	0.15
"Furmergency": The Wolf siblings are planning to celebrate for Apollo's birthday, while Draculaura and Frankie are still figuring out how to get the Sea Monster Talisman in hopes to bringing back the Wolf siblings' mom. Meanwhile, their pets, Watzie and Count Fabulous, are not getting along and started fighting, until they got out of Monster High and into the human world, where they are being chased by a human named "Ralph" with his monster detector. Now, the monster pets must hide in the Wolf residence and find a way to return to Monster High to their respective owners. "Boogey Nightmare": Twyla is being haunted by the Night Terror where she is being forced to do the Rite of Passage by growing up and forget about her friends. Then, she accidentally opened the portal from the dream world to reality where the Night Terror is haunting Clawdeen, Draculaura, and Deuce in their dreams. Twyla then entered the dream world and tried to stop the Night Terror from haunting her friends, but he keeps on evading her and Twyla is about to give up to her nightmares. However, with the help of the Boo Crew and with the advice from Mr. Mothmanson, Twyla must face her fears and defeat the Night Terror, which turns into a dust bunny named Dustin.
21	21	"Best Fiends"	Sarah Nerboso	Jack McGee, Ariel Song (director)	October 17, 2023	121	0.21
21	21	"Scareer Day"	Callie C. Miller	Katherine Hashimoto & Tom Sales, Broni Likomanov (director)	October 17, 2023	121	0.21
"Best Fiends": It's the Ghoul Spirit Day at Monster High, and Draculaura is trying to cast a spell to make friendship bracelets for her, Clawdeen, and Frankie, but the Codex is late for the Book Fair, so Draculaura wrote down the spell on her notebook. Then, after Draculaura and Toralei bumped into each other, Toralei put on the bracelet, and then the friendship bracelets got her and Draculaura literally stuck together. Now, the unlikely duo must work together and perform at the Fearleading showcase for the Ghoul Spirit Day, while Clawdeen and Frankie search for Codex in order to undo the spell Draculaura cast. "Scareer Day": Heath becomes interested in joining the Screamhouse Gasing career with Mrs. Bominable and Abbey at Scareer Day. But then, his day gets interrupted by his dad; president, CEO, and lord of the Underworld, Hades, which makes Heath embarrassed. Unaware, Hades broke the ice and freed the Slumber Pixies that put the monsters to sleep at Monster High. While Heath, Abbey, Lagoona, and Kuma all try to stop the Slumber Pixies, Mrs. Bominable tells Hades that he always cared about his life work rather than his own son. Hades now regrets for all the mistakes he had done to Heath and decided to help him how to stop the Slumber Pixies, as father and son.
22	22	"Stone Alone"	Leah Longoria	Erik Lechtenberg & Tom Sales, Matt Whitlock & Mike Tisserand (directors)	October 18, 2023	122	0.16
22	22	"Horsin' Around"	Phillip Walker	Roan Everly, Ariel Song (director)	October 18, 2023	122	0.16
"Stone Alone": Deuce was permitted by his mothers to go camping with Manny, Finnegan, Frankie, and Cleo. However, Deuce is being supervised by two of his big sisters because they believe he is not ready to experience camping by himself, as they treat him like a baby gorgon. Then, Deuce found out that they were sabotaging him and walked far away from them in anger. Suddenly, his sisters and the rest of the Boo Crew are surrounded by the ghost chasm and they yell for Deuce's help. Deuce then got his sisters to trust him and his camping experience so he can save them and the Boo Crew from the ghost chasm. "Horsin' Around": The talismans have been stolen and Monster High is under lockdown with Headless Headmistress Bloodgood's noble steed, Nightmare, on her watch. Clawd knows who the perpretrator is and is trying to escape curfew to catch him, only to be caught by Nightmare and was given lots of homework as punishment, and the same goes to Draculaura. The next day, Clawd and Draculaura have decided to work together to catch the perpretrator, the Sugar Rush Bandit, while avoiding to get caught by Nightmare once again. Although the plan failed, Clawd had an idea on how to catch the Sugar Rush Bandit, by setting a trap so that he and Draculaura will catch him and get the talismans back.
23	23	"Moonlit Fieldtrip"	Mike Carrier	Fred Gonzales, Broni Likomanov (director)	October 19, 2023	123	0.15
23	23	"A Little Boost"	Scott Peterson	Erik Lechtenberg & Talia Ellis, Mike Tisserand (director)	October 19, 2023	123	0.15
"Moonlit Fieldtrip": Howleen and Barkimedes asked Clawdeen if they can visit the human world during the full moon, and Clawdeen reluctantly accepted their requests, so long as they don't get caught by monster hunters. Then, Barkimedes in his human form met Buddy, whom Clawdeen knows he is a monster hunter and she forbids him to go skateboarding with him. However, on their way back to Monster High, Barkimedes was exposed as a werewolf in front of Buddy and was caught on camera. But then, Buddy has decided not to post the video worldwide, as he used to hunt monsters but not anymore, keeping the werewolf secret safe with him. "A Little Boost": Lagoona sees a new student named "Gil", a freshwater monster who looks like the love of her life from her novel. Frankie tries to give Lagonna an advice on how to meet Gil and getting to know each other, but Lagoona would rather find some way to get him to notice her. Then, Lagoona registered for a Casketball tournament in order to impress Gil, but he did not notice her at all. Lagoona then asked Frankie to give her an electric boost in hopes to get Gil to like her. However, things go awry when too many zaps on Lagoona caused her to ruin the tournament. Lagoona then apologized to Frankie and has decided to go meet Gil, the old fashion way.
24	24	"Fresh Waters Run Deep"	Sarah Nerboso	Jack McGee, Katherine Nguyen & Nazul Sobrino, Ariel Song (director)	October 23, 2023	124	0.12
24	24	"Sew Fierce"	Leah Longoria	Katherine Hashimoto, Broni Likomanov (director)	October 24, 2023	124	0.15
"Fresh Waters Run Deep": Lagoona and Gil have been developing their feelings for each other. But then, Frankie noticed a picture of what appears to be the Sea Monster Talisman, which is the last Talisman they need to bring back Clawdeen's mom. Lagoona is starting to have mixed feelings when she realized that the freshwater monsters have stolen the Talisman, and to prove that it may not be a Talisman, Gil challenged his cousin, the reigning champion of the Water Wars. The following night, Gil was about to accept the challenge, but then he decided that Lagoona should accept it, because he admits that it really is a Talisman and apologized to her for what his ancestors had done years ago. After Lagoona won the challenge and got the Talisman, the Boo Crew are now one step closer to bringing back Clawdeen's mom. "Sew Fierce": As Frankie is playing fetch with Watzie and Mortimer, they meet Skelita, a fashionist skeleton girl from Hexico. Skelita wants to design her clothes for the fashion contest in order to honor her grandma, and Frankie have decided to help her out. Meanwhile, Monster High is somehow coming in hot, as the heat is starting to burn up the entire school. Then, Watzie took the clothes from Skelita all the way underground where Skelita and Frankie saw the cause of the heat: Mortimer burning under Monster High. Skelita and Frankie have now realized that they took Mortimer's favorite fabric by mistake and gave it back to him, finally cooling down Monster High. Skelita has a new idea on how to design her own clothes in order to win the contest, with the help of Frankie.
25	25	"Witchful Thinking"	Callie C. Miller	Mike Jones, Rachel Doda & Roan Everly, Ariel Song (director)	October 25, 2023	125	0.12
25	25	"Monster Match"	Phillip Walker	Rachel Doda, Matt Whitlock (director)	October 26, 2023	125	0.12
"Witchful Thinking": Draculaura is trying to apply for witchcraft camp by casting a spell that is unique for her while the rest of the Boo Crew is planning for the upcoming Monster Ball event. However, Headless Headmistress Bloodgood installed an app that detects witchcraft, and Draculaura must avoid getting caught or she will be expelled. As she tried doing her unique witchcraft again to make a crystal glow, Draculaura keeps getting distracted by doing all the monster stuff with the Boo Crew. Then, as Draculaura accidentally cast a black hole spell that swallows Clawdeen and Frankie, she saves them by doing her unique witchcraft, making the crystal glow and officially registering for the witchcraft camp. "Monster Match": The Monster Ball event is almost here, and Frankie wants to ask Cleo out for said event in order for them to have a Monster Match with her, in which a Monster Match is where two monsters develop feelings for each other and become a couple. But then, Deuce showed up and asked Frankie to go out on the Monster Ball, which Frankie said yes, but they're not sure what are they going to do about it. However, they eventually took the advice from Clawdeen and Draculaura and told Deuce the truth between them and Cleo, and then Deuce understands. Suddenly, Cleo made her video about meeting Autumn Patch at a restaurant, and Frankie must go there to ask Cleo out before Deuce does.
26	26	"The Monster Way"	Shea Fontana	Fred Gonzales, Rob Sales & Tom Sales, Broni Likomanov, Matt Whitlock & Moss Lawton (directors)	December 8, 2023	126	0.16
School's out, and every monster is preparing themselves for the Monster Ball. The Boo Crew have arrived at the Monster Ball with all their talismans, while every other monster is having fun. Then, after Apollo arrived, the bloodmoon eclipse is happening, and the Boo Crew are trying to open the portal to bring back Selena Wolf. However, Catarina interrupted the ritual and possessed the all-monster talisman to steal the power of the talismans and become the most powerful ruler of all monsters in the world, and then she trapped the Boo Crew in the catacombs. Fortunately, Draculaura cast a spell to get them all out of there. Then, Frankie remembered that there is only one talisman that can neutralize the all-monster talisman from Catarina: The all-human talisman. While the rest of the Boo Crew evaded from the other monsters that are possessed by Catarina via livestream, Frankie, Draculaura, Clawd, and Apollo found the all-human talisman, which is stuck on the front door of the Wolf residence. After that, Clawdeen and Toralei finally made amends with one another, and then Clawdeen gave Toralei the werecreature talisman while Clawdeen uses the all-human talisman to stop Catarina, Toralei's own mother. The final battle against Catarina has begun, and the Boo Crew are all using their talismans to neutralize the all-monster talisman. Suddenly, Catarina captured Apollo and tried to turn him into a stone with gorgon power. However, Clawdeen sacrificed herself to protect her father and to finally remove all the power from Catarina, defeating her in a process. After bringing Clawdeen back to life, the Boo Crew finally opened the portal and Selena came back to rejoin her family. After that, Selena stepped down from the throne and Clawdeen became the new ruler of all the werecreatures for saving everyone in Monster High. Headless Headmistress Bloodgood saw Draculaura doing witchcraft. Rather than expelling her, Bloodgood made an exception and will do everything she can to lift the "no witchcraft" rule since Draculaura saved her from being possessed. Afterwards, the Boo Crew celebrate at Monster Ball and the Wolf family are gonna enjoy having dinner together at last with Toralei joining in. The end for Clawdeen's chapter is the beginning of another as the new ruler of all werecreatures. Note: Starting from this episode, Clawdeen's Moonclaw Necklace has a new design due to the gem being combined with the golden gem on the Human talisman after the Monster Ball.

=== Season 2 (2024) ===
No. overall	No. in season	Title	Written by	Storyboard by	Original release date	Prod. code	U.S. viewers (millions)
27	1	"Rule School"	Phillip Walker	Mike Jones, Ariel Song (director)	March 11, 2024	201	0.14
27	1	"Rule School"	Phillip Walker	Tom Sales, Broni Likomanov (director)	March 11, 2024	201	0.14
After her coronation, Clawdeen was going to start her new semester at Monster High with the Boo Crew. However, ever since she became the new Wereruler, things have changed when her new assistant, Foxford, gives her the Wereruler tasks for her to sign on, including Romulus' failed attempts to defeat her for the title of Wereruler, making Clawdeen spend less time with the Boo Crew. Then, there was a feud between Whiskerene and Whiskerbeth, the two mayors of West Furham and East Furham who blamed each other for the loss of their statues. When Clawdeen suggested that their respective kingdoms should be united, Whiskerene and Whiskerbeth have decided to fight each other for the rulership of the entire kingdom of Furham, though Clawdeen was against that idea and would rather figure out how to solve that problem without violence. After reading the history of the West and East Furham, Clawdeen tried to get Whiskerene and Whiskerbeth to get to know each other for the better, but to no avail as they continued to fight each other. She then had a pep talk with her mom, Selena, which Clawdeen explained that being the Wereruler is harder than she thought, especially after meeting the werecreatures she never knew and making new problems. Selena then gives her an advice that Clawdeen must trust her human instincts and lead. Clawdeen then sees Toralei and Romulus having a feud over what dinner should they have, and when they put it to a vote, Clawdeen now has a solution to solve the Furham problem. Back on the a Furrball Hall, Clawdeen broadcast all over Monster High and announced her retirement as Wereruler and every monster must vote for a rightful Werecreature to become the new Wereruler. Clawdeen then gives the keys to Foxford and she finally spent some time with Frankie and Draculaura to start their new semester together. Unbeknownst to Clawdeen, it turns out that it was Foxford who stole the statues from West and East Furham in an attempt to wear her down as Wereruler.
28	2	"New Witch in Town"	Scott Peterson	Fred Gonzales & Kristen Gish, Moss Lawton (director)	March 12, 2024	202	N/A
28	2	"Play It Again, Clawd"	Leanna Dindal	Jack McGee & Katherine Hashimoto, Ariel Song (director)	March 12, 2024	202	N/A
"New Witch in Town": After talking to her fellow witch friend via phone, Draculaura was warned by Headless Headmistress Bloodgood that, although witchcraft was allowed, no human witch will ever set foot on Monster High. Then, while Draculaura is doing witchcraft to help her fellow monsters, there was another witchcraft that has gone bad, and Bloodgood thinks Draculaura was responsible for that mess. Bloodgood then warns her that Superintendent Slugerson is coming to check up on Monster High, and if she spots a witchcraft, then all of the witchcraft will be banned forever. Draculaura then meets Skelita, the one who tried to do witchcraft like she did. During the witchcraft training, Skelita accidentally casts a spell that made the Boo Crew float indefinitely. Now, Draculaura and Skelita must figure out how to undo that spell before Slugerson arrives. "Play It Again, Clawd": Friday the 13th has arrived, and Clawd is planning to celebrate that unlucky day with Selena. However, Clawdeen and Apollo have interrupted Clawd's day and it ended up in a disaster. Then, Clawd wakes up in the same morning, thinking that he was having a nightmare. He tried to celebrate with Selena again, but things go awry with Clawdeen and Apollo interrupting again. Clawd wakes up again, and it turns out that he is in a time loop, though he is unaware that a bug keeps on biting him that made him go back in time whenever Friday the 13th did not go as planned. Clawd is trying to figure out how to stop the time loop so that he and his mom should celebrate Friday the 13th all by themselves. In a last time loop, his family found out about the time bug on Clawd's shoulder, and since he got them into that mess, they must all stop the bug in order to finally celebrate Friday the 13th.
29	3	"Mummy in the Mirror"	Leah Longoria	Fred Gonzales, Broni Likomanov (director)	March 13, 2024	203	N/A
29	3	"How to Scare a Banshee"	Sarah Nerboso	Rachel Doda & Talia Ellis, Moss Lawton (director)	March 13, 2024	203	N/A
"Mummy in the Mirror": Cleo is getting less views after uploading her video with the help of Frankie. However, after reading one of the comments, Cleo went to the ancient tomb and discovers a magic mirror where her mirror self switched places with her in order to get more views on her "Eek Tok" account. But, it turns out that Cleo's mirror self is uploading videos about herself criticizing her fellow monsters, which she then traps the real Cleo behind the mirror. Now, Cleo needs Frankie's help to bring her back to the real world and put Cleo's mirror self back behind the mirror where she belongs, even if it means deleting her Eek Tok account in order to make her mirror self lose her popularity. "How to Scare a Banshee": Mrs. O'Shriek has lost her shriek and she is unable to speak louder. Headless Headmistress Bloodgood then announces a competition, where, in order for Mrs. O'Shriek to get her shriek back, the winning monster who scares her will earn a trophy. Many monsters have tried, but none of them succeeded into scaring her. Clawd is determined to win the contest by scaring Mrs. O'Shriek, but so does Draculaura, in which Clawd and Draculaura competed against each other to see who will scare Mrs. O'Shriek first. However, they soon put aside their competition against each other and have decided that they should scare Mrs. O'Shriek together, with the help of the Boo Crew.
30	4	"So Chill"	Anna Thorup	Rachel Doda, Ariel Song (director)	March 14, 2024	204A	N/A
30	4	"Mix Up Meowlody"	Scott Peterson	Katherine Hashimoto, Broni Likomanov & Stephen Heneveld (directors)	March 18, 2024	204B	0.10
"So Chill": Abbey and Clawdeen were about to work on their project for their presentation at Mr. Mothmanson's class, but Clawdeen's Wereruler duties made her forget the posters for their assignment. When Abbey became stressed out about their unfinished project, she accidentally freezes Clawdeen and she cannot figure out how to unfreeze her, as Abbey hid the frozen Clawdeen in the janitor room. Abbey then accidentally froze Draculaura, Heath, Goobert, and Deuce when they kept asking her about Clawdeen, in which it stressed her out. With no other choice, she calls her mom, Tundra, for help in order to unfreeze the Boo Crew so they can do their presentation on time. "Mix Up Meowlody": The Hissfits were going to do their rehearsal for their next concert, but Toralei is busy and cannot perform, so Purrsephone and Meowlody will have to perform by themselves. Meowlody was tasked by Purrsephone to get help with their band equipment, though it was not what Purrsephone was hoping for. Later, Meowlody told Purrsephone that their next performance is on the catacombs, and she invited the Boo Crew to watch their concert. As the twins are performing with their new song, their loud music echoed all over the catacombs, waking up the catacomb crawlers that caused them to destroy the concert. Now, the twins must lure the catacomb crawlers away from the concert in order to finish their performance.
31	5	"The Haunted Sand Castle Caper"	Leah Longoria	Tom Sales, Moss Lawton (director)	March 19, 2024	205	0.11
31	5	"The Haunted Sand Castle Caper"	Leah Longoria	Jack McGee, Ariel Song (director)	March 19, 2024	205	0.11
The Boo Crew is having a vacation at Dracula's hotel in the Bermuda Triangle, where Dracula is hosting the "Haunted Sand Castle" contest, followed by the endorsement. At the same time, Lagoona is recording a video regarding the Wereruler election with the candidates. However, on the next night, someone destroyed Romulus' sand castle, and every monster is a suspect in the scene of a crime. Dracula tasks Clawdeen, as the Wereruler, to investigate and figure out the real culprit, and Clawdeen gets some help with the Boo Crew. They then pointed out the four suspects: Whiskerene, Whiskerbeth, Bearon, and Selena, though Clawdeen does not believe her own mom did it. After investigating to no avail, Clawdeen thinks that the culprit is Romulus, the one who destroyed his own castle just so he could win the Wereruler election. But then, the Bermuda Triangle curse transported Clawdeen to somewhere else on the island, which she then discovered a secret entrance that can only be opened by a Wereruler crown. Clawdeen then meets the ghost of the first Wereruler, who realized that she once made a mistake where the werecreatures were fighting for the title of Wereruler for generations. It turns out that Clawdeen is the first werecreature to solve the problem without violence, with the election, and she now knows what she must do. Clawdeen confessed to the Boo Crew that while they were investigating, she hid the evidence from them, and that evidence was Selena's hand print next to Romulus' destroyed sand castle. The Boo Crew forgave her, and Lagoona recorded a video that showed Selena sleepwalking while stealing the mangoes. After the case was solved, Dracula endorsed the new Wereruler, Foxford, by awarding him the werecreature fang. The Boo Crew then celebrated at the beach by doing the limbo dance. But, unaware to the other monsters, it turns out that Foxford was the true culprit by disguising himself as Selena to steal the mangoes and destroy Romulus' sand castle. He then disguised himself as Dracula to steal a valuable item from Dracula's vault, and is planning to continue his nefarious schemes.
32	6	"Fangs for the Memories"	Anna Thorup	Fred Gonzales, Broni Likomanov & Stephen Heneveld (directors)	March 20, 2024	206A	0.12
32	6	"Two-riffic"	Tilly Bridges & Susan Bridges	Talia Ellis, Moss Lawton (director)	March 21, 2024	206B	N/A
"Fangs for the Memories": Draculaura was given the key to the heart's desires, which then transported her and Heath back in time when they were children. As she was trying to figure out how to go back to the present, she got a call and was informed that the only way back is to open the door of any of the hotel rooms. After entering the room, they opened the same door in hopes to go back, but they keep ending up in different dimensions. Then, Heath has decided to play "Hot Potato" with a beach ball, which Draculaura then figured out how to go back and reunite with the Boo Crew: Draculaura and Heath must relive in their memories when they were children by playing "Hot Potato", and then get a picture taken, just like how Draculaura got her picture taken back then. "Two-riffic": It's the last night of the vacation at the Bermuda Triangle, and Clawdeen has a dilemma: She can either hang out with the Boo Crew for the 1000th annual sunrise or hang out with Venus McFlytrap to watch the Moonsie Flower bloom. Then, Clawdeen had an idea: She split herself up into two Clawdeens to do both of her things. However, that also split up her two personalities: One Clawdeen who is smart and the other Clawdeen who is silly. And to make things worse, the smart Clawdeen made her words complicated for Venus while the silly Clawdeen got the Boo Crew trapped in the quicksand. With no other choice, the smart Clawdeen will have to merge with her silly version back together so that Venus can figure out how to save the Boo Crew from being eaten by the Snackasaur.
33	7	"Monster High-jinks"	Rose Bueno	Rachel Doda, Ariel Song (director)	March 25, 2024	207A	N/A
33	7	"Vamps Just Wanna Have Fun"	Sarah Nerboso	Chris Meinen, Fred Gonzales & Katherine Hasimoto, Stephen Heneveld (director)	March 26, 2024	207B	0.10
"Monster High-jinks": It's Parents Day at Monster High, and every monster student get to spend their time with their respective parents, except for Toralei who was bummed about Catarina never having her time with her. And to make things worse, Monster High is being cursed with hi-jinks that makes it topsy-turvy to the monsters and their respective parents. However, during her pep talk with Coach Thunderbird, Toralei figured out that whenever she feels lonely without Catarina, the entire school is getting messed up. Now, Toralei must figure out how to make herself feel better and stop the hi-jinks in Monster High, by singing her song while playing a broken piano in a music room. "Vamps Just Wanna Have Fun": Draculaura's mom, Fang Wei, has come to Monster High to visit her. Then, after Draculaura showed her stuff to Fang Wei, there was a rivalry between Deuce's mom, Medusa, and Fang Wei who complete against each other. Headless Headmistress Bloodgood tells Draculaura, Deuce, and their respective mothers about themselves competing against each other instead of having fun, which was years ago in the past, so they made an agreement that they must lose to have fun. The "Student Plus One" contest is underway, and during that competition, Clawdeen and Frankie found out that Draculaura and Fang Wei are losing on purpose, in which, to them, that is not what it means to have fun. Before the final game, Draculaura and Fang Wei apologized for not understanding about having fun, and the same goes for Deuce and Medusa. Now, the Vampires and the Gorgons must get through the thorned maze to see who gets to the goal first while having fun at the same time.
34	8	"The Babysitters' Crypt"	Phillip Walker	Rob Sales, Moss Lawton (director)	October 1, 2024	208	N/A
34	8	"Humans in High School"	Mae Catt	Jack McGee, Ariel Song (director)	October 1, 2024	208	N/A
"The Babysitters' Crypt": Nefera and Cleo are tasked by Clawd on how to babysit a little monster. While he babysits a Baby Kraken, the De Nile Sisters are going to babysit Romulus' little brothers: Fuzz, Yap, and Furr-Edrick. Nefera claims to be in charge of babysitting while teaching Cleo a lesson on how to do so, but to Nefera's surprise, Cleo is actually doing a better job at babysitting, making Nefera jealous. Then, the De Nile Sisters notice Fuzz missing, and they found out that he is trapped inside the Jack-in-a-Box, breaking Clawd's rules for losing a child and making a mess. Now, they must get inside the Jack-in-a-Box and work together as babysitters to bring Fuzz back. "Humans in High School": Barkimedes is excited that his human friend, Buddy, came to visit Monster High so that they can have a party with Twyla, Lagoona, and Manny. They then play a board game called "Humans in High School", where the Boo Crew get to role play as the humans: Barkimedes as "Archie", Lagoona as "Lydia", Manny as "Mandrew", and Buddy as himself, though Buddy did not like that idea. During the game, they use their human powers to compete on who gets the coffee maker on a mall. However, Buddy is irritated that Barkimedes got the human information all wrong, and the Boo Crew felt guilty for that. The Boo Crew then decided to fix that mistake and work together with Buddy in order to beat the game and learn more about being a human.
35	9	"Dawn of the Dread"	Leanna Dindal	Fred Gonzales, Stephen Heneveld & Broni Likomanov (directors)	October 2, 2024	209A	N/A
35	9	"Frankie Patrol"	Callie C. Miller	Talia Ellis & Rob Sales, Moss Lawton (director)	October 2, 2024	209B	N/A
"Dawn of the Dread": Ghoulia is starting to get anxious after Test Day, so Lagoona suggested that Ghoulia makes an appointment with Dr. C. Suddenly, she met a brain monster, which is actually her anxiety. Ghoulia tried everything to get rid of her anxiety with the help of the Boo Crew, but to no avail since her anxiety is making the situations worse. Then, after reading a book about a tree that can get rid of anything, Ghoulia took her anxiety all the way to that tree in order to get rid of it for good. However, Ghoulia now realized that she needs her anxiety more than ever so that they can solve their problems together. Ghoulia and her anxiety have decided to go to their appointment with Dr. C before they are late. "Frankie Patrol": Frankie have invented a newly built robot called "Brush Brush", but then the robot has gone haywire and they had to shut it down. Frankie's parents, Victor and Mary, came to visit them, and, worried about Frankie's safety, the Steins have decided to rebuild Brush Brush with new adaptations in order to keep them safe. But, things have gotten worse when Brush Brush was about to attack Watzie, right before Frankie shut it down again. The Steins then built Brush Brush into a giant robot that looks like Frankie, and it swallowed Frankie and their parents. Then, after the giant robot swallowed Cleo and Deuce, Frankie have had enough and they stood up for themselves by shutting the robot down and tell their parents to not worry about them too much and they can be safe without any safety stuff.
36	10	"The Deuce Date"	Stephanie Sim	Rachel Doda, Ariel Song (director)	October 3, 2024	210	N/A
36	10	"Big Paw, Little Paw"	Sarah Nerboso	Katherine Hasmimoto & Lane Lueras, Stephen Heneveld (director)	October 3, 2024	210	N/A
"The Deuce Date": It's Heartbeast Night at Monster High, and each pair of monsters are given two hearts to prove that they love each other. However, Heath and Lagoona noticed Deuce all alone in the catacombs, they think he is sad that he may never get a heart for Heartbeast Night. They planned for a dinner date for Deuce to invite someone he likes, but it did not go as planned when he and his snakes ate dinner. They then planned for a movie night for Deuce and someone special, but instead, he invited every monster, which is not what they had in mind. Heath and Lagoona then argued about who gets to make Deuce date someone, but Deuce put a stop to that as he explained that he doesn't need any romance stuff, he only wanted to spend some good time with his monster friends. "Big Paw, Little Paw": Toralei called on the "Big Paw, Little Paw" meeting, where the werecreatures from Monster High get to pair up with the werecreatures from Monster Middle and do some activities together. Mousecedes is paired up with Pawl, Barkimedes is paired up with Pawla, Clawdeen is paired up with Bunny Erikson, and Toralei is paired up with Hisstina, though Toralei has a bad feeling about this. While the other werecreatures are performing their activities successfully, such as having tea, making friendship bracelets, and painting a mural, Toralei is feeling like she is not doing her good job mentoring Hisstina while trying to do everything as planned. However, after a pep talk with Clawdeen, Toralei now realize what she must do to mentor Hisstina right, by doing what werecats originally do: Making a mess.
37	11	"Ghoulishly Ghoul-ma"	Leah Longoria	Tom Sales, Moss Lawton (director)	October 7, 2024	211	N/A
37	11	"Gil to the Rescue"	Scott Peterson	Jack McGee, Ariel Song (director)	October 7, 2024	211	N/A
"Ghoulishly Ghoul-ma": Spectra goes to the abandoned cabin in the Human World to visit her grandma, "Ghoulma Vondergeist", but then she soon learns that Ghoulma is retiring. As two human teenagers arrive along with a famous and fearless ghost hunter, Spectra begins to sabotage their family haunt so that Ghoulma will not retire. However, that sabotage lead Ghoulma trapped in a painting where no ghost can get in or out. Spectra felt awful about that situation, so she called the Boo Crew for help in order to scare the fearless ghost hunter, disable the force field around the painting, and save her Ghoulma. "Gil to the Rescue": While reading the superhero comics, Gil wishes he can become a superhero, so he got Skelita design a superhero suit just for him and he became a new superhero named "Cobalt Kid". As Cobalt Kid, Gil has done many good deeds. Skelita quickly found out about that Gil is Cobalt Kid and warns him not to get the power over on his head, until Headless Headmistress Bloodgood tasked "Cobalt Kid" to give any monster a detention for breaking any rule. However, a bunch of Trash Goblins are attacking Bloodgood, and Gil must do the right thing to save Monster High, without his superhero suit, even if it means exposing his secret identity to every monster.
38	12	"Oh Rats"	Tilly & Susan Bridges	Fred Gonzales, Stephen Heneveld (director)	October 8, 2024	212	N/A
38	12	"Fired Up"	Leanna Dindal	Talia Ellis, Moss Lawton (director)	October 8, 2024	212	N/A
"Oh Rats": Deuce hosts the Pet Scare outside Monster High, where all the monsters bring their respective pets for his presentation with his pet rat "Perseus". Suddenly, Deuce's sisters, Eurayle and Stheno, came to watch his presentation, only to tell him that Perseus has stage fright and cannot participate. Ignoring his sisters' warning, Deuce found a replacement from the Catacombs, a "Ratticus Mimicus", which caused it to copy the powers from each monster and wreak havoc at Monster High. With no other choice, Deuce needs help from his sisters and Perseus to stop the chaos caused by that Copy Rat. "Fired Up": Heath is about to be ready to present his Climate Science project. Suddenly, Jinafire Long showed up as a new student of Monster High, and she can control the weather. Feeling jealous, Heath took the "advice" from Deuce's snakes, Envy and Pride, to make his climate activism better than Jinafire's. Then, Heath got irritated when he sees his thermostat project soaked by Jinafire, so he redesigned his thermostat project in order to make it boiling hot like a lava. Unfortunately, that caused the entire Monster High to literally get boiled hot when the lava started rising up from below. Feeling bad for what he did after Abbey told him about what Jinafire really did to help out, Heath got the help from her and Jinafire to stop the lava from melting Monster High to the ground.
39	13	"The Shapeshiftian Candidate"	Sarah Nerboso	Rachel Doda, Katherine Hashimoto & Lane Lueras, Ariel Song & Stephen Heneveld (directors)	October 9, 2024	213	N/A
Clawdeen is worried that the Wereruler Election is doing poorly. However, she got a text message from a famous monster idol named "Catty Noir", who agreed that she will perform the Election Concert in order for the monsters to vote for the rightful Wereruler fairly. But, during the tour at Monster High with Catty Noir, Clawdeen got a call from Selena who tells her that she is dropping out of the Election, and when Clawdeen was expecting a rightful Wereruler who is not selfish and who can make fair decisions, Romulus gets triggered when she thinks that he is selfish as a candidate. Meanwhile, Foxford's shapeshifting power is going out of control, until he figured out how he can stay in his current form from the book that he read. As the Boo Crew is preparing for Catty Noir to perform in a concert, Clawdeen sees Romulus sabotaging the Eek-Tok services with a jamming device, and when she caught up with him, another Clawdeen showed up out of nowhere and used her stuffed whale to create a portal and suck Clawdeen and Romulus to another dimension where they encounter a Giant Troll. As they tried to get out of there, they met the real Foxford, who spend days stuck in that dimension and he does not trust either of these werewolves. Meanwhile, the shapeshifter posing as Clawdeen announced that she is running for Wereruler and she will make some changes when elected. Frankie and Draculaura found out that the Clawdeen they met is an imposter and they go after her in order to expose that imposter, with Lagoona tagging along while recording a camera. Elsewhere, Clawdeen and Romulus argued about being a rightful Wereruler, until he confessed that he sabotaged the Election because he was being pushed around by Catarina and wanted to stand up for himself, which is why he is running for Wereruler. Now that they settled their differences, Clawdeen and Romulus, along with Foxford, worked together to distract the Troll and went back to Monster High, which exposed the imposter Clawdeen as a shapeshifter, who then makes a getaway. Then, Catty Noir performed the Election Concert with a song, after Barkimedes becomes a surprise candidate for Wereruler. Though the concert was a success and unknown to the Boo Crew, it was revealed that Headless Headmistress Bloodgood is trapped in another dimension while the shapeshifter is still at Monster High, posing as Bloodgood.
40	14	"Codex Come Back"	Anna Thorup	Tom Sales, Moss Lawton (director)	October 10, 2024	214	N/A
40	14	"Officially Complicated"	Rose Bueno	Jack McGee, Ariel Song (director)	October 10, 2024	214	N/A
"Codex Come Back": Draculaura is impressed about Yi-Ling's latest witchcraft that made Yi-Ling's cat forget about what cat snack did it ate. But when Codex hears Draculaura saying that she wanted that new spellbook, he feels offended and he left Monster High all the way to the library at the Human World. Draculaura felt awful about what she said, so Clawdeen and Clawd help her find Codex. However, when trying to keep on low profile, Draculaura accidentally casts a spell on the Wolf Siblings that erased their memories. After Codex casts a spell to freeze time, Draculaura comes clean and apologizes to him as she realized that she needs him more than ever, as her favorite spellbook. "Officially Complicated": Lagoona and Gil are planning to take a picture so they can become an official couple on Eek-Tok. But then, Lagoona got a message from her ghostly ex-boyfriend, Wailon, and when she tried to delete that message from her Eek-Tok account, she pressed "Direct Summon" by mistake and he came back to "haunt" her. Ghoulia noticed Lagoona chomping and finds out that Lagoona has been avoiding Wailon and ignoring Gil at the same time, but rather than taking Ghoulia's advice to tell Wailon the truth, she continues to trying to get away from him. Eventually, after getting caught by Wailon, Lagoona must tell him the truth that she has moved on with Gil, her new boyfriend.
41	15	"Little Smoothie Shop of Horrors"	Leah Longoria	Fred Gonzalez, Stephen Heneveld (director)	October 15, 2024	215	N/A
41	15	"The Great Bat Detective"	Sarah Nerboso	Talia Ellis, Moss Lawton (director)	October 15, 2024	215	N/A
"Little Smoothie Shop of Horrors": While selling the smoothies in her Smoothie Shop, Venus sees Nefera and Cleo selling "Boo-rritos" to the rest of the monsters, and Venus believes that Nefera is a "boss monster" who got an easy job like that. Venus then tries to do what Nefera did and overworks herself, but then she gets stressed out over her studies and pollinates the monstrous plants accidentally to make them attack Monster High. Nefera then goes to talk to Venus about how is she feeling, which Nefera then tells her that even she could not have done everything on her own, as she needed her family's help to finish the job and finds a way to not get stressed out. Venus now realized what she must do to: She has to stop her plants by pollinating them, with the help of the Boo Crew. "The Great Bat Detective": Clawdeen and Bunny are investigating the wilted leaves that are spread all over school grounds, until they discover that Venus is wilting, and Bunny then figures out that she must find a companion plant that is guarded by the Dancing Bats in order to stop the wilting from Venus. Meanwhile, Draculaura and Deuce are trying to find the Goo-berries with the help of the living Tater Tot that once came to life by her witchcraft, though they had to bribe him with condiments. Elsewhere, Bunny got separated from Clawdeen and Venus, who then became possessed by the Dancing Bats that forced them to dance infinitely. Bunny was once told by Clawdeen that, despite being scared of anything, she has to be brave on her own and she must save the Boo Crew by distracting the Dancing Bats and getting the companion plant.
42	16	"You've Got Meow"	Mike Carrier & Taylor Cox	Rachel Doda, Ariel Song (director)	October 16, 2024	216A	N/A
42	16	"Finnegan Faces the Music"	Stephanie Sim	Peter Foltz, Stephen Heneveld (director)	October 17, 2024	216B	N/A
"You've Got Meow": Toralei was assigned with Barkimedes to work on a school project together by taking pictures of the arts in a newly installed app called "Monst-Art", but she would rather make a post about herself, though she got bad comments soon after. However, she received a good comment from a mysterious monster who admired her. Meanwhile, Purrsephone and Meowlody are removing all recycles from the Trash Goblins and threw it at the Recycle Goblins in order to keep Monster High clean. As she keeps avoiding Barkimedes and their school project, Toralei tries to figure out who the secret admirer is, until she and Purrsephone figure out that there is something going on between Meowlody and Barkimedes, so they devise a plan to get them together so that Toralei can get all the credit. "Finnegan Faces the Music": Finnegan is trying to turn his guitar into a Master Trident, but it only transformed into a regular Trident, and he cannot go to the concert until he completes his training. Ghoulia decides to help him out while recording with a camera for their documentary assignment. Meanwhile, "Headless Headmistress Bloodgood" assigns all the monsters to do some chores. Rather than following the school rules, Finnegan goes on a rampage with Ghoulia tagging along by making a lot of mess in Monster High, and when he tries to turn his guitar into a Master Trident, it breaks in half and he misses the concert. Soon after, Finnegan confesses to "Bloodgood" about the entire mess he and Ghoulia made and they accepted their punishment to clean up the entire school.
43	17	"Monster Fest"	Tilly & Susan Bridges	Tom Sales, Jack McGee, Nazul Sobrino, Fred Gonzales, & Talia Ellis, Moss Lawton, Ariel Song & Stephen Heneveld (directors)	October 21, 2024	217	N/A
44	18	"Monster Fest"	Tilly & Susan Bridges	Tom Sales, Jack McGee, Nazul Sobrino, Fred Gonzales, & Talia Ellis, Moss Lawton, Ariel Song & Stephen Heneveld (directors)	October 21, 2024	218	N/A
The Monster Fest event has begun, and Frankie have been chosen as "Head Haunter" so they can announce the concert performance by a monster idol named "Phoenix". However, Frankie are trying to think of something to make every monster happy, until Hades got them to sign a contract for their partnership. Upon signing a contract, Frankie approved of Hades to sponsor the entire Monster Fest, and closed down the food truck that Scarecrow Von Twolegs was selling scare-amel apples. While Cleo tries to find a perfect gift for Frankie, she suddenly disappeared, along with the Boo Crew and the rest of the monsters, leaving a magical spider web behind by spiders known as "Weblings". Heath, feeling ignored by his own father, believes that Hades is responsible for the mess, so he has decided to help Frankie and Phoenix find their fellow monsters, and eventually, they ended up inside one of the Underworld, Inc. factories, where they found out that the Weblings are selling trick skulls called "Skullduggers" all over the Monster World. Unfortunately, they ended up getting captured, including Hades, who soon found out that he was tricked by his new business partner who is the true mastermind behind the events, an evil witchcraft-performing spider monster known as "Trick", one of the founders of Monster Fest, whose goal is to rid the Monster World of all the treats and filled with nothing but tricks. Suddenly, Frankie started singing a song, which somehow gave strength to a good witchcraft-performing spider monster known as "Treat", Trick's twin brother, and another one of the founders of Monster Fest, who was Scarecrow Von Twolegs in disguise. The battle between Trick and Treat has begun, and while Treat holds Trick off, Frankie, Phoenix, Heath, Hades, and the rest of the Boo Crew (who have transformed into pink Weblings; but have been restored by Treat soon after) stopped the Weblings and Lagoona destroyed all the Skullduggers. However, it was not enough to defeat Trick, because Underworld, Inc.'s international factories have already sold and are selling countless Skullduggers across the Monster World, and the partnership between him and Underworld, Inc. will never be severed under a contract Hades signed. With no other choice, and doing what is right to make Heath proud, Hades has decided to shut his own company down permanently, officially destroying the partnership with Trick and turning him back into a powerless little spider. And with that, the Monster Fest is back on, and every monster have celebrated the night with Frankie, Phoenix, and the rest of the Boo Crew performing a song.
45	19	"Attack of the Besties"	Mae Catt	Rachel Doda, Ariel Song (director)	October 22, 2024	219A	N/A
45	19	"Night of the Unliving Frog"	Sarah Nerboso	Katherine Hashimoto & Tom Sales, Stephen Heneveld (director)	October 23, 2024	219B	N/A
"Attack of the Besties": One of the Kaijus, Gakaiju, has a falling out with the other Kaiju, Modirah, and has arrived at Monster High to play Casketball with the Boo Crew. After a rough play, Gakaiju starts hanging out with Deuce, though he had to keep his cool as a peacemaker and not let her annoyance get to him, especially when she calls him "Dunce" rather than his real name. During lunchtime, Deuce is starting to get angry at her, as one of his snakes, Wrath, is suggesting that Deuce has to stand up for himself and not become friends with Gakaiju anymore. However, Deuce has a plan to get Gakaiju back together with Modirah so they can forgive and forget, with the help of Frankie to pilot their giant robot and force the Kaijus to fight together rather than each other. "Night of the Unliving Frog": Manny is about to go to the classroom for his next assignment, only to find out that he must reanimate and de-animate a dead frog in order to pass a Biology class. After reanimating a dead frog, Manny has grown attached to it and, rather than de-animating it, he took it to his room so they can have fun with each other. Ms. Zis noticed that one dead frog is missing, and Romulus is on the case to find it, until he changed his mind to help Manny and Twyla free the dead frogs. However, Ms. Zis called the other staff for help to capture the dead frogs, and after the staff caught up with it, Manny must convince Ms. Zis that the dead frogs should stay reanimated and be free. Meanwhile, during her final day as Wereruler, Clawdeen encounters the Shapeshifter as "Bloodgood" who accidentally gives away Whaley.
46	20	"One Were to Rule Them All"	Sarah Nerboso	Fred Gonzales, Tom Sales, Rachel Doda and Stephen Heneveld, Moss Lawton and Ariel Song (directors)	October 24, 2024	220	N/A
In their final ever episode, Clawdeen encounters the Shapeshifter and tried to capture them, but they get away posing as "Clawdeen", leaving the gold orb behind. The Boo Crew want to help Clawdeen to capture the Shapeshifter and save the real Bloodgood who is trapped in the Troll Dimension. While Frankie, Cleo, and Clawd go to search for the Shapeshifter, Clawdeen, Draculaura, and Deuce went to the Troll Dimension, and together with Bloodgood, they managed to escape from the Troll Dimension. Soon after, the Boo Crew found the Shapeshifter posing as "Lagoona" who got Whaley back, but as they tried to get them, the Shapeshifter turned into a Kraken Reporter to fight the Boo Crew in a final battle. Clawdeen tried to reason with the Shapeshifter by asking them about the riddle from the book of how to stop shapeshifting, but then the Shapeshifter imprisoned the Boo Crew and escaped to the concert in front of Monster High. Meanwhile, Toralei and Whiskerene are taking care of the "Little Paws", and when the Little Paws are in danger because of the Shapeshifter's rampage, Whiskerene saved them and took them to the Wereruler office for safety. Elsewhere, Draculaura used her witchcraft to set the Boo Crew free, and Clawdeen has a plan to defeat the Shapeshifter once and for all, with the help of Catty Noir. As Catty performed a song, the Boo Crew turned on the speakers that became loud enough to cause the Catacomb Crawlers to get out of Monster High and crawl all over the Shapeshifter, defeating them and causing them to turn back to their original form: A giant Werewhale. The Werewhale's real name is Hemming, and he confessed that he was the one who impersonated all monsters when he first used his shapeshifting powers. Hemming then apologized for his actions and is about to go back to the ocean where he belongs. However, Clawdeen forgave him and she decided to give her Werecreature pendant to him so he can turn into a werepolar bear so he can stay on land. Bloodgood then welcomes Hemming to Monster High, though she had to punish him for his actions soon after. Now, Clawdeen has announced the winner of the Wereruler Election: Whiskerene, since her actions to save her fellow werecreatures are proof enough that she deserves to become the next Wereruler. All of the monsters from Monster High celebrate with Catty performing her song with the Boo Crew.

== Production ==
On February 23, 2021, Mattel, through its television division, announced the second return of the Monster High brand, promising new content and products for the following year, including an animated TV series of 26 episodes and a live-action musical film.

Shea Fontana, previously the showrunner of the 2018 reboot of Polly Pocket, was announced as the series' showrunner and co-executive producer.

On July 13, 2022, the cast was announced via Twitter with Gabrielle Nevaeh Green as Clawdeen Wolf, Courtney Lin as Draculaura and iris menas as Frankie Stein.

The series originally premiered officially on October 28, 2022, with the first episode airing directly out of the premiere of Monster High: The Movie on October 6.

On November 17, 2022, Nickelodeon renewed the series for a 20-episode second season, which premiered on March 11, 2024 and concluded on October 26, 2024.

== Soundtrack ==
Monster High: Animated Series Soundtrack

Soundtrack album by Monster High
- Released: January 27, 2023
- Genre: Children's Music
- Length: 22:20
- Label: Arts Music

Monster High chronology
Monster High: Animated Series Soundtrack (2023)	Monster High: Animated Series Season 2 Soundtrack (2024)

The series's soundtrack album was released on digital platforms on January 27, 2023 by Arts Music, which contains 8 songs.

No.	Title	Writer(s)	Artist(s)	Length
1.	"Monster High Theme Song (From the 2022 Television Series)"	Glenda "Gizzle" Proby; Ivan LaFever; Jason Gleed; KZ Nova; Michael Kotch; Paul Robb; Stef Fink	Monster High	2:24
2.	"Hear My Howl"	Jason Gleed; Julia Piker; Sheléa Melody McDonald; Stef Fink	Monster High	2:00
3.	"My Moon"	German Briseno; Jason Gleed; Julia Piker; Stef Fink	Monster High	2:40
4.	"Party Don't Stop"	German Briseno; Jason Gleed; Stef Fink	Monster High	2:46
5.	"Flaunt Your Skeleton"	Annelise Noronha; German Briseno; Jason Gleed; Stef Fink	Monster High	3:25
6.	"Cool Cat"	Hayden Wolf; Jason Gleed; Jayli Wolf; Stef Fink	Monster High	2:27
7.	"This Monster Life"	Annelise Noronha; German Briseno; Glenda "Gizzle" Proby; Stef Fink	Monster High	2:28
8.	"Light It Up"	German Briseno; Stef Fink	Monster High	2:41
Total length:				22:20

=== Season 2 ===
Monster High: Animated Series Season 2 Soundtrack

Soundtrack album by Monster High
- Released: May 31, 2024
- Genre: Children's Music
- Length: 26:24
- Label: Arts Music

Monster High chronology
Monster High: Animated Series Soundtrack (2023)	Monster High: Animated Series Season 2 Soundtrack (2024)

Arts Music released the soundtrack album for the second season of Monster High on May 31, 2024 on digital platforms, which contains 10 original songs from the series.

No.	Title	Writer(s)	Artist(s)	Length
1.	"Show 'Em What You've Got"	German Briseno; Stef Fink	Monster High	2:35
2.	"Stuck In the Loop"	Jason Gleed; Stef Fink	Monster High	2:21
3.	"Hissfits Forever"	Jason Gleed; Stef Fink	Monster High	2:25
4.	"You're Gonna Fly"	Jason Gleed; Stef Fink	Monster High	3:05
5.	"Hold On"	Jason Gleed; Shelea Melody Frazier; Stef Fink	Monster High	2:27
6.	"Monster of Love"	Jason Gleed; Stef Fink	Monster High	2:45
7.	"Let Your Voice Be Heard"	Isaiah Kraig Carter; Jason Gleed; Stef Fink	Monster High	2:55
8.	"The Rules of Rock and Roll"	German Briseno; Stef Fink	Monster High	2:13
9.	"Weave Your Own Web"	Jacqueline Rose; German Briseno; Stef Fink	Monster High	3:01
10.	"Lucky to Be Me"	Glenda R Proby; Jason Gleed; Stef Fink	Monster High	2:44
Total length:				26:24

== Reception ==
Diondra Brown from Common Sense Media gave the series three-out-of-five stars, calling it "a funny and clever animated series, geared towards tween audiences."

=== Accolades ===
Monster High received a nomination for Outstanding Children's Programming at the 35th and 36th GLAAD Media Awards and for Favorite Animated Show at the 2024 and 2025 Kids' Choice Awards.

== Home media ==
Region	Set title	Season(s)	Aspect ratio	Episode count	Time length	Release date
1	Season One	1	16:9	26	585 minutes	February 13, 2024
1	Season Two	2	16:9	20	587 minutes	February 18, 2025
