= Can I Get Your Number =

Can I Get Your Number may refer to:

- "Can I Get Your Number", single by Full Force 1994
- "Can I Get Your Number", single by boyband No Authority 2000
- "Can I Get Your Number", song by Anne-Marie from album Speak Your Mind 2018
