= Onikuma =

Mythological Japanese creature

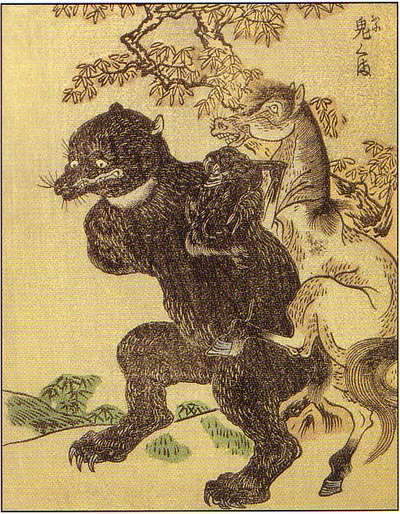
A depiction of an onikuma by Shunsensai Takehara in the Ehon Hyaku Monogatari

An onikuma (鬼熊, literally "demon bear") is a mythological Japanese yōkai originating in the Kiso Valley in Nagano Prefecture. It is a bear-like creature that has been known to walk upright. They sneak into villages at night to carry off livestock for food. It was described in the Ehon Hyaku Monogatari, a collection of supernatural tales published in 1841.

== Description ==
When a bear has lived for many years, it becomes an onikuma. With enough strength to be able to move boulders as large as two meters in diameter, it is said to be able to kill a small animal simply by pushing it. It comes down from the mountains to steal horses and cattle, which it brings back to the mountain to eat.

Some large stones in the Kiso Valley are called "Onikuma stones." Given their size and placement, they are attributed to onikuma. Local tradition states that onikuma throw these stones, larger than ten people together could move, at humans from the mountains above.

The method to kill an onikuma was to hollow out a large tree into a tube like a well lining and use it to block up the mouth of the nest of vines, then plunge poles through the hollow trunk into the nest. When the disoriented onikuma made its way to the opening, it would be attacked with spears and guns. It is said that in the Kyōhō era, when several onikuma were killed, each skin when spread out covered an area of six tatami mats (about 10 square meters) or more.

Additionally, in Hokkaido, bears that attacked humans were feared as onikuma.

== In popular culture ==
=== Television ===
An Onikuma appeared in the Monster High episode "The Monstering". While its ability to throw rocks remains intact, the Onikuma can be subdued by tickling it. The Onikuma named Kuma (voiced by Sekai Murashige) found its way onto Monster High property and went on a rampage. When Clawdeen Wolf had her first transformation into a werewolf, she was able to tickle Kuma. Both were later accepted into Monster High. By the episode "Creature Clash", Kuma learned how to speak.

=== Film ===
Onikuma (2016) is a hybrid live-action/stop motion animation short film directed by Alessia Cecchet that premiered at the 34th Torino Film Festival, Italy in November 2016.

=== Music ===
OniKuma is a extreme metal group from White Sulphur Springs, West Virginia USA.
