= Chimera House =

Urban legend

The Chimera House (also known "13 Floor Money Back House", 13 Story Money Back Haunted House or the 13th Floor Haunted House) is an urban legend which typically involves a group of teenagers going out for a night on the town, only to stumble across a large, worn down multiple story building where they are offered to go through a haunted attraction that consists of "real" horrors inside. In the story, the teens are asked to pay a certain amount of money (anywhere from 20 to 100 dollars) and told they will receive a portion back for every floor they complete. The twist is that no one has ever completed the house, and the ones who tried never came back out. Rumors differ about the various horrors inside the house, from poisonous animals to deformed humans or other supernatural phenomenons. Accounts vary as to the exact number of floors in the house, but most accounts give the house 13 floors.

== Origins ==
The legend is usually set in the south or mid-west since there are a large amount of open and unknown areas in those parts. The editor of Haunted Attraction Magazine believes the urban legend originally started in Kansas City while others have suggested that the legend was also inspired by real haunted attractions like Britannia Manor and Raven's Grin Inn. Although the Chimera House has never been proven to exist, some people still search fervently for it and several haunted attractions are asked if they are the infamous 13 floor haunted house every October.

The legend of the Chimera House has been fueled by both hoaxes and haunted attractions that tried to cash in on the legend by offering refunds if certain conditions are met. The anthology Haunted Houses edited by Robert D. San Souci contains a short story inspired by the legend called "Chimera House," in which several inner-city kids are led to the infamous haunted attraction.

== Versions ==
The Chimera House has been associated with various locations in the United States, including Detroit, Chicago, Ohio but also New York and Los Angeles.

The second season of Channel Zero revisited the premise of the story and called it the No-End House.
