= No Authority =

American boy band

- Origin: Los Angeles, California, U.S.
- Genres: R&B, teen pop
- Years active: 1996–2001
- Labels: Work, MJJ Music; Maverick
- Past members: Josh Keaton; Tommy McCarthy; Ricky Rebel; Eric "Stretchy" Stretch; Danny Zavatsky

No Authority was an American boy band that was signed to Michael Jackson's record label MJJ music. They are known for their singles, "Don't Stop", "One More Time". "Girlfriend" (which was featured on the Trippin' soundtrack), "Can I Get Your Number" and "What I Wanna Do".

== Career ==
The group, which original members consisted of Josh Keaton, Ricky Godinez (who now performs under the name Ricky Rebel), Eric "Stretchy" Stretch and Danny Zavatsky, were based in Los Angeles, California. They performed in local venues in the Los Angeles area until a music producer sent a demo tape they made to Michael Jackson himself. He later signed them to a record contract with his label MJJ music.

Their debut single "Don't Stop" was written and produced by Rodney "Darkchild" Jerkins. It was a moderate hit with the Billboard pop and urban charts. Their debut album, "Keep On", was later released on the MJJ and Sony Work labels, with moderate success. After that, releasing a few other singles from their debut album that went uncharted. Josh Keaton, withdrew himself from the group and Godinez, Stretch and Zavatsky continued to stay with the group. Tommy McCarthy joined the group soon after Keaton left, and the group was signed to an album deal with Maverick. They released the single, "Can I Get Your Number", which was a moderate success in the pop charts. Their eponymous second album, on Maverick records did not do well at all commercially. The group disbanded shortly after this.

Josh Keaton is known for being the voice of Spider-Man and Spyro the Dragon. Ricky Rebel (who was known as Ricky Godinez during his time in the group) is still performing and was on tour as a backup performer with Britney Spears.

== Discography ==
=== Albums ===
Year	Album title
1997	Keep On
2000	No Authority

=== Singles ===
Year	Song title
1997	"Don't Stop"
1998	"Up and Down"
1998	"One More Time"
1999	"Girlfriend"
1999	"What I Wanna Do"
2000	"Can I Get Your Number"
