= Human Torch (comics) =

Human Torch, in comics, may refer to:

- Human Torch (android), the original Timely Comics character
- Human Torch, Marvel Comics' member of the Fantastic Four
