= Ricky Rebel =

American singer-songwriter, dancer, musician, and recording artist

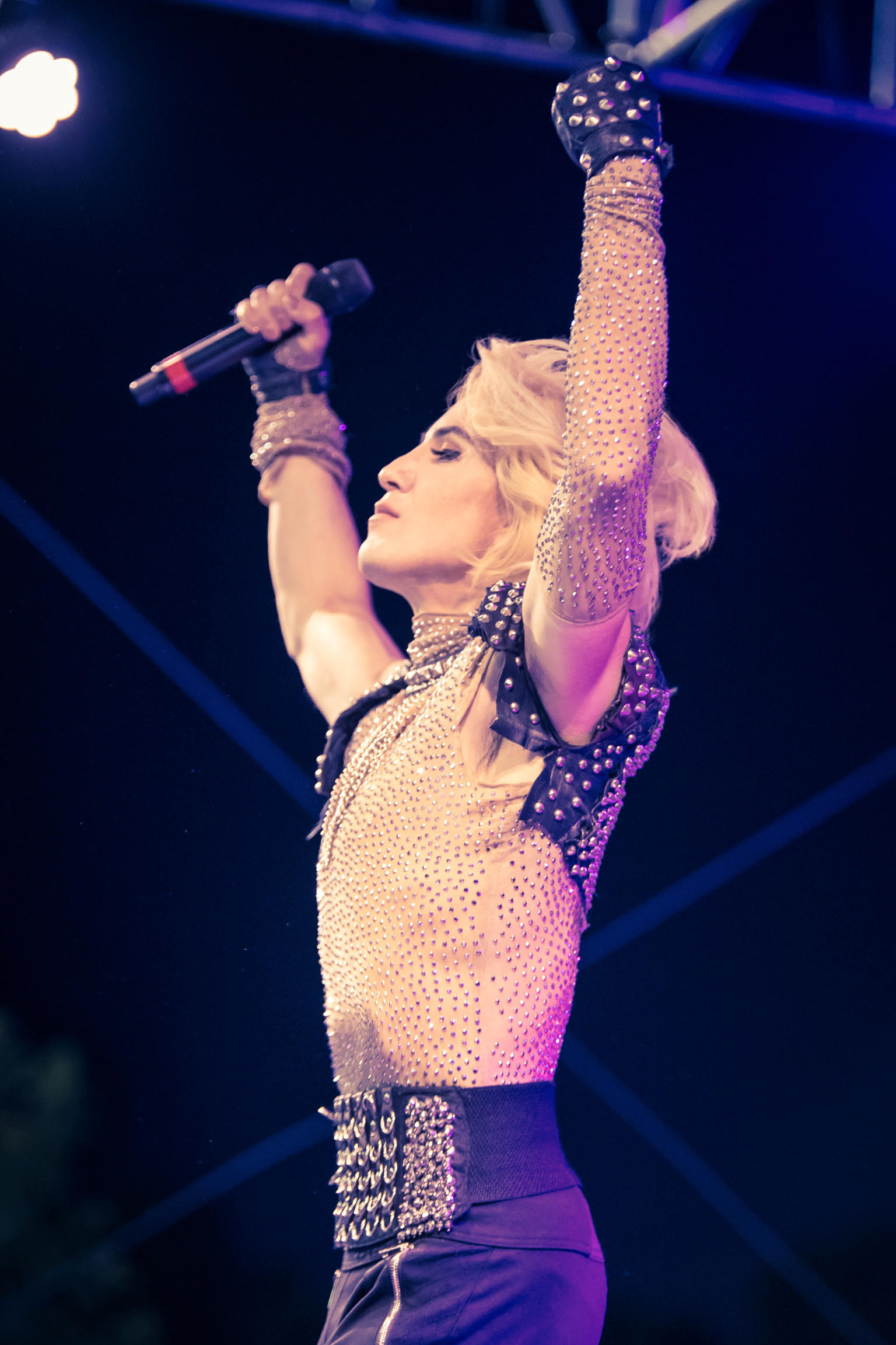
- Rebel in 2017
- Born: Ricky Godinez; December 2, 1980 (age 45); Upland, California, U.S.
- Other names: Ricky Godinez, Ricky G, Ricky Harlow
- Musical career
- Genres: Pop; dance-pop; R&B; Indie rock; folk rock
- Occupations: Singer, songwriter, recording artist, dancer
- Years active: 1995–present
- Formerly of: No Authority
- Website: rickyrebelrocks.com

Ricky Godinez, known by his stage name Ricky Rebel (born December 2, 1980), is an American singer-songwriter, dancer, musician, and recording artist.

== Early life ==
Rebel was born in Upland, California. He began training as a gymnast at the age of seven, and ranked 15th in the state of California at the age of 11. Rebel began training in classical ballet and jazz dance styles around the age of 11. Rebel immediately entered dance competitions at the regional and national level. After some years of competitive dancing, Rebel then began acting, and performed in musicals like Annie (1991), Oliver! (1992) and Phantom (1994).

In Los Angeles, he began training with vocal coaches Eric Vetro, Seth Riggs, and Mara Buyugalova and choreographers like Marguerite Derricks. Debbie Allen then cast Rebel in the lead role of Pepito's Story, which debuted at the Kennedy Center.

== Career ==
=== 1995–2002 ===
In 1995, Rebel lent his voice to the Tom Hanks film Apollo 13. In 1996, Rebel started working with the band No Authority as their lead vocalist. No Authority was discovered by an A&R representative from Sony Records, and subsequently was signed to Michael Jackson's label MJJ Music, a custom label at Sony.

In 1997, Rebel worked on multiple films, once as an actor in the film Anywhere but Here, once as a musical performer on the soundtrack for the animated film Anastasia, and once as a dancer in Austin Powers: International Man of Mystery.

In 1997, No Authority released their first album Keep On, produced by Rodney Jerkins. The single "Girlfriend" appeared on the Trippin' original soundtrack. No Authority toured Europe twice during this time and opened for Aaron Carter on the Kids Go Music Festival. The group also traveled to Canada to perform on the YTV Psyko Blast concert. In 1999, Rebel was featured in the Pepsi "Joy of Cola" commercial starring Aretha Franklin.

After A&R representatives obtained a copy of No Authority's second album the group was later signed to Madonna's label Maverick Records. While signed to Maverick Records the group released their first single "What I Wanna Do" produced by Herbie Crichlow from their self-titled album No Authority. The next single "Can I Get Your Number (A Girl Like You)," charted at number 18 on the Billboard Charts and their third single "I'm Telling You This" was used in the movie Rugrats in Paris, which became a gold certified record. The group toured and performed with Britney Spears (whom he opened for in her "Oops! I Did It Again" tour), Destiny's Child, 98 Degrees, Jessica Simpson, and the All That! Music and More Festival, after appearing in an episode of the Nickelodeon show All That!.

=== 2003–2010 ===
During the period between leaving No Authority and the beginning of his new identity as Ricky Rebel, Rebel continued to perform on stage in shows like and Aida. Rebel became known as "Ricky Harlow" in 2004 when he assumed the role of lead vocalist for the band Harlow. In 2004, he appeared in episodes of American Dreams and Boston Public, and later appeared at a children's charity event alongside Lindsay Lohan. While working with Harlow, Rebel produced an album with Jay Baumgardner called Unstoppable. After performing around Southern California with Harlow the group disbanded in 2009 when Rebel encountered strong censorship from his manager/producer, and from the recording industry in general, about Rebel's desire to be an openly gay musician, and yearning to produce his own brand of dance pop music even since his days in No Authority.

In 2010, Rebel was cast in two of My Chemical Romance's official music videos "Na Na Na" and "Sing" where he played an androgynous rollerskating character named "Show Pony". He opened for My Chemical Romance for their CD release party at the House of Blues in Hollywood.

=== 2010–present ===
Since 2010 Rebel has been performing as a solo artist. Rebel made a guest appearance on VH1's Audrina in 2011.

In 2012 Rebel won the RAWards Musician of Year Award, where he debuted his first big single "Geisha Dance." Also in 2012 Rebel released his first album Manipulator; music from the album was featured on MTV's Good Vibes. "Geisha Dance" was on the Mediabase Chart for 10 weeks (the chart featured on On Air with Ryan Seacrest).

In 2014, Rebel collaborated with Claudio Cueni and released his second EP The Blue Album, which was preceded by the Blue EP. Since 2014 Rebel has been a regular contributor to US Weekly's "Fashion Police" spread.

In 2015, he appeared on the Fox 5 San Diego to perform his new single "Star" from his album The Blue Album. He appeared as a celebrity model during the Los Angeles Fashion Week. Over 2015, he performed with multiple artists on tours, including Colbie Caillat and Blood On The Dance Floor. In late 2015 Rebel secured a sponsorship agreement with the cosmetics company Mustaev USA, and subsequently produced the music video for his single "Boys and Sometimes Girls" directed by Rock Jacobs.

As part of his commitment to advancing gay rights in the United States Rebel performed at the 2014, 2015, and 2016 "Out at the Fair" festivals at The San Diego County Fair. Rebel also performed at Gay Pride festivals in major cities like Phoenix, Long Beach, Orange County, Palm Springs, San Diego, and Las Vegas. Also, in 2015 Rebel performed at Matinee festivals in Las Vegas and San Diego. He was signed to Revry TV, an LGBTQ streaming platform.

He performed at the 2016 "Get Out! Awards" in New York City. Later in 2016 Rebel toured with boy-band O-Town. Since 2015 Rebel has been working with DJ's Hector Fonseca, Casey Alva, and Tommy Love to remix his songs "Star" and "Boys and Sometimes Girls."

In 2017, "Boys & Sometimes Girls" spent 9 weeks on the Billboard Dance Club Songs chart and peaked at No. 28. Rebel performed at the 2017 SXSW (South by Southwest) Festival in Austin, Texas. Rebel also performed at a charity event at the Cannes Film Festival. Rebel released The New Alpha in 2017 on Audio4Play Records. This album features the single "If You Were My Baby". In 2019, "The New Alpha" music video was selected for best music video at the New Renaissance Film Festival. It was considered in 2017 by the Grammy Foundation for a Grammy nomination and was ranked 67 on Louder Than War's top 75 albums of 2017 list. He headlined "The Artist One Tour" along with other singers, and also appeared at the American Influencer Awards. He received support from MAC Cosmetics, and his documentary on Revry was nominated for Best Music Documentary at the Out Web Fest Awards.

In 2018, he performed in the New York Pride parade, representing Univision TV Network. This performance was of "Life is a Runway", which was turned into a music video. He later started working on a custom jewelry line called the "Ricky Rebel Renaissance" collection.

In 2019, Rebel toured Japan as part of the "Champion" concert series. A tea ceremony was held in Rebel's honor with Master Watanabe Tsutomu, a top tea master. Ricky also appears on the red carpet at the GRAMMY Awards followed by an appearance the next morning on FOX & Friends. ELLE magazine also named Ricky, as well as David Bowie and Madonna, to their Most Outrageous GRAMMYs Outfits in History list.

In 2023, One of the songs from his album 'Wild Reality', titled "Time Will Tell", was featured in the movie 'Apocalypse Love'. The film won Best Animated Feature award at the Golden State Film Festival.

== Political views ==
At the 61st Annual Grammy Awards Rebel wore a pro-Donald Trump jacket. He stated, "I'm reflecting millions of Americans out there who voted for Trump. Keep America great. That's right, baby. We are here. We're here all around the world, 50 million of us. My name is Ricky Rebel and I'm a reflection of America." He appeared on Fox & Friends following this event. Elle regarded his appearance at the 2019 Grammy Awards as one of the most "outrageous" in its history. Rebel did not dress up for the Grammy Awards in protest of the impeachment of Donald Trump.

He has done performances reflecting his politics, such as a performance during the #DemandFreeSpeech Rally in front of the White House and a performance at the American Priority Festival at the Trump Doral. In November 2020, Rebel attended the Stop the Steal protest over the 2020 Presidential election results. He later flew to Washington D.C. to attend the similar protest on January 6, 2021. He was slated to speak at this protest outside of the United States Capitol, but cancelled these plans after attendees began rioting and storming the Capitol.

== Discography ==
Album name	Release date	Singles
Manipulator	2012	Manipulator, Geisha Dance
The Blue Album	2014	Star, Boys & Sometimes Girls
Star (Remixes)	2015	Star (Remixes)
Boys & Sometimes Girls (Remixes)	2016	Boys & Sometimes Girls (Remixes)
The New Alpha	2017	Time, If You Were My Baby
Magic Carpet (Remixes)	2019	Magic Carpet (Remixes)
The Royal Collection	2021	
Wild Reality	2022	Time Will Tell
Veronica	2024	Veronica
