= Meredith O'Connor =

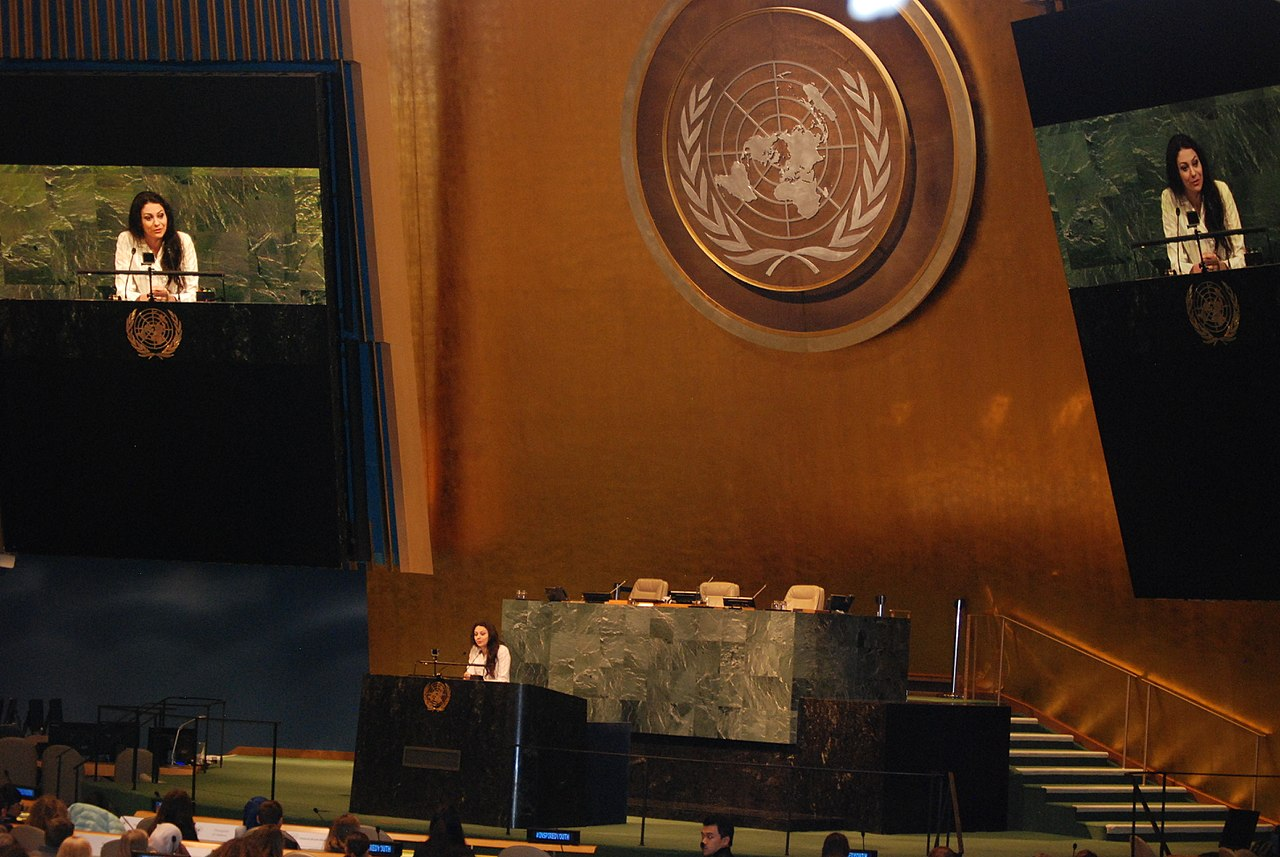
Meredith O'Connor

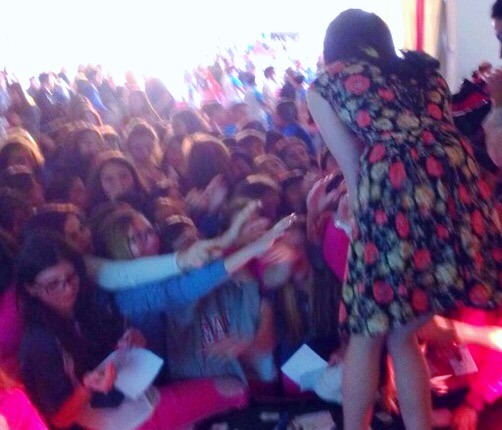
With Fans on Tour in Greece

Meredith O'Connor is an American businesswoman and former singer. She first gained recognition as a singer and songwriter in the early 2010s before shifting her focus toward mental-health advocacy and related business initiatives. O'Connor has been featured in coverage by outlets including Forbes and UN Today about her work and impact from combining popular culture and mental-health awareness.

O'Connor is currently based in Los Angeles and New York City, United States. Her latest release is an international collaboration titled "You Are Not Alone (International)". The beneficiary of the song is the National Alliance on Mental Illness. Celebrities featured in the song include Minzy, RUGGERO, Reekado Banks, and Mary Wilson from the Supremes.

== Early career ==
Meredith O'Connor began her career as a model before being signed for music. After being discovered, her first music video for the song "Celebrity" went viral. She then used her fame to speak out on mental health and bullying.

== Appearances in film ==
In 2015, O'Connor appeared as one of the celebrity cameos alongside Garrett Clayton, Jon Header, and many others in Lionsgate's "Los Huevos" in the American version. She also had cameos alongside Drake Bell in 'Bunny Bravo' of Superdope TV. Recently, Arianna Huffington's Thrive had announced the development of an autobiography feature based on the life of O'Connor, telling the story of how her music has impacted fans. It is planned to be directed by Ilyssa Goodman and Garrett Clayton, while Addison Rickie will play O'Connor as a child.

== Advocacy ==
O'Connor has said that she was bullied as a child. Based on her experience, she became an advocate for victims of bullying and an anti-bullying spokesperson, becoming an official advisor of Reach Out. Her advocacy has resulted in multiple accolades and recognition for global impact. She delivered a TEDx talk on her impact and anti-bullying advocacy. She has also spoken at the United Nations General Assembly Hall multiple times in 2018.

In the Steppin Out magazine, O'Connor said that she wrote her song "The Game" to show fans that things can get better.

In 2013–14, O'Connor embarked on a ten city tour to promote the music video for her song "The Game". During the tour, she and her team performed for thousands of young people in schools, encouraging the victims of bullying to stay strong.

== Music ==
O'Connor released her debut EP in February 2013. The music video for the lead single "Celebrity" went viral on YouTube The EP received positive reviews from music bloggers Andrew Greenhalgh and G. W. Hill.

O'Connor's single "Just the Thing" was officially released on iTunes on April 22, 2014. O'Connor released her debut album "I am" in late 2015. The song "Stronger" from the album features Disney's Teen Beach movie's Garrett Clayton.

O'Connor is a celebrity advocate for the United Nations' Project 50/50. Her next film will be based on her own life, produced and directed by Ilyssa Goodman, who directed "A Cinderella Story".

O'Connor's international mental health campaign called "You Are Not Alone" features celebrities from around the world to raise funds and awareness for mental illness treatment. Celebrities include K-pop singer Minzy, Argentina's RUGGERO, afro-pop singer Reekado Banks, and Mary Wilson of the Supremes.

== Modeling ==
Before O'Connor was signed for her first single, she was signed by Model Management Group based in New York City. After that, she did modeling work for companies including Lord & Taylor.

== Discography ==
studio albums

- Meredith O'Connor (2013)
- I Am (2015)

Singles

- Just the Thing (2014)
- Being Me (2015)
- Unforgettable Night (2015)
- Guardian Angel (2019)
- You Are Not Alone (International) (2021)
