= Nicolas Cage filmography =

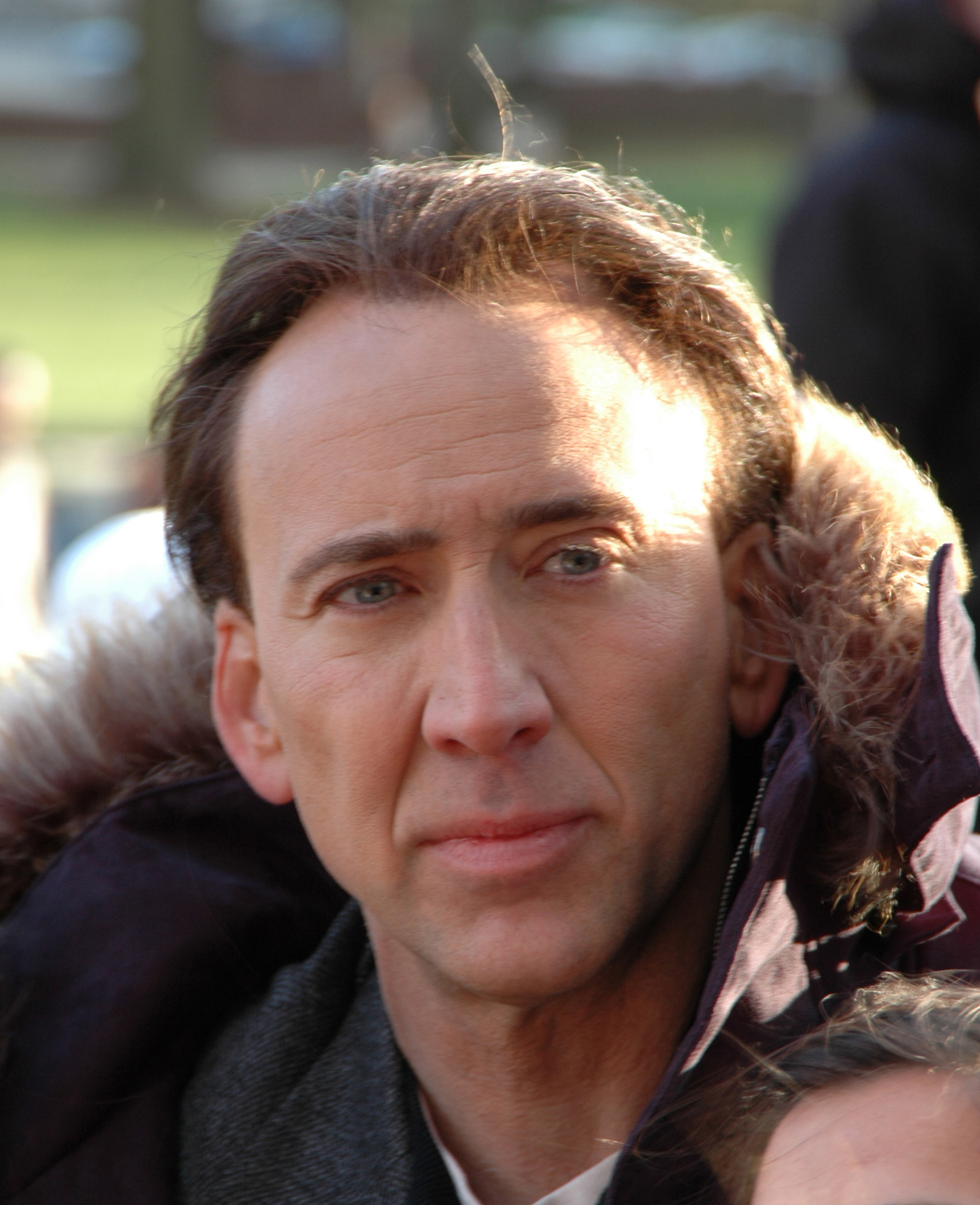
Cage in 2006

Nicolas Cage is an American actor whose career began with a role in the 1981 television pilot The Best of Times. The following year, Cage made his feature film acting debut with a minor role in Fast Times at Ridgemont High, the second and last time he used his birth name Nicolas Coppola, which he changed professionally to avoid allegations of nepotism due to his connection to the Coppola family. In 1983, Cage starred in the teen romantic comedy Valley Girl alongside Deborah Foreman and had a supporting role in his uncle Francis Ford Coppola's Rumble Fish.

In 1984, Cage portrayed a fictionalized version of hitman Mad Dog Coll in Coppola's The Cotton Club and appeared in Birdy, a film that the National Board of Review listed among the top ten films of that year. He starred in Coppola's Peggy Sue Got Married in 1986 before leading the 1987 crime comedy Raising Arizona, written and directed by the Coen brothers. In 1988, he earned a Golden Globe nomination for Best Actor – Motion Picture Musical or Comedy for his role as the romantic lead in Moonstruck. In 1989, he appeared in the black comedy film Vampire's Kiss, a box-office bomb that later gained a cult following for his "chaotic" performance. In 1990, he led the David Lynch film Wild at Heart.

In 1992, Cage earned his second Golden Globe nomination for the romantic comedy Honeymoon in Vegas. Three years later, he starred as a suicidal alcoholic in the critically acclaimed Leaving Las Vegas, for which he received a BAFTA Award nomination for Best Actor in a Leading Role, and earned the Golden Globe for Best Actor – Motion Picture Drama and the Academy Award for Best Actor. In 2002, he made his directorial debut with Sonny and portrayed filmmaker Charlie Kaufman in Adaptation, another critically acclaimed film that earned him his most recent Best Actor nominations at the Academy Awards, BAFTA Awards, and Golden Globes Awards.

In the 1990s, Cage's career rocketed as a leading man; films of his that made over $100 million in theaters included The Rock (1996), Con Air (1997), Face/Off (1997), City of Angels (1998), Snake Eyes (1998), Gone in 60 Seconds (2000), The Family Man (2000), National Treasure and its sequel (2004; 2007), World Trade Center (2006), Ghost Rider and its sequel (2007; 2011), Knowing (2009), and The Sorcerer's Apprentice (2010). In the 2010s, Cage found himself "taking roles left and right" after a series of box-office disappointments and to pay off his debts to the IRS, placing him in numerous films, many going direct-to-video. His participation in various genres during this time increased his popularity and gained him a cult following. Cage's highest-grossing movie is the 2013 animated film The Croods. His additional voice roles include Superman in Teen Titans Go! To the Movies and Spider-Man Noir in Spider-Man: Into the Spider-Verse (both 2018). Recent films of his that earned critical acclaim include Mandy (2018), Color Out of Space (2019), Pig (2021), The Unbearable Weight of Massive Talent (2022), Dream Scenario (2023), and Longlegs (2024).

== Film ==
Nicolas Cage's film credits
Year	Title	Role	Notes	Ref(s)
1982	Fast Times at Ridgemont High	Dave / Brad's Bud	Credited as Nicolas Coppola	
1983	Valley Girl	Randy		
1983	Rumble Fish	Smokey		
1984	Racing with the Moon	Nicky / Bud		
1984	The Cotton Club	Vincent Dwyer		
1984	Birdy	Al Columbato		
1986	The Boy in Blue	Ned Hanlan		
1986	Peggy Sue Got Married	Charlie Bodell		
1987	Raising Arizona	H.I. McDunnough		
1987	Moonstruck	Ronny Cammareri		
1989	Vampire's Kiss	Peter Loew		
1989	Time to Kill	Enrico Silvestri		
1989	Never on Tuesday	Man in Red Sports Car	Direct-to-video; uncredited cameo	
1990	Wild at Heart	Sailor Ripley		
1990	Fire Birds	Jake Preston		
1990	Industrial Symphony No. 1: The Dream of the Brokenhearted	Heartbreaker	Concert film	
1991	Zandalee	Johnny Collins	Direct-to-video	
1992	Honeymoon in Vegas	Jack Singer		
1993	Amos & Andrew	Amos Odell		
1993	Red Rock West	Michael Williams		
1993	Deadfall	Eddie King		
1994	Guarding Tess	Doug Chesnic		
1994	It Could Happen to You	Charlie Lang		
1994	Trapped in Paradise	Bill Firpo		
1995	Kiss of Death	Little Junior Brown		
1995	Leaving Las Vegas	Ben Sanderson		
1996	The Rock	Stanley Goodspeed		
1997	Con Air	Cameron Poe		
1997	Face/Off	Castor Troy / Sean Archer		
1998	City of Angels	Seth		
1998	Snake Eyes	Rick Santoro		
1999	8MM	Tom Welles		
1999	Bringing Out the Dead	Frank Pierce		
2000	Gone in 60 Seconds	Memphis Raines		
2000	The Family Man	Jack Campbell		
2000	Bel Air	—N/a	Producer only	
2000	Shadow of the Vampire	—N/a	Producer only	
2001	Captain Corelli's Mandolin	Captain Antonio Corelli		
2001	Christmas Carol: The Movie	Jacob Marley	Voice role	
2002	Windtalkers	Joe Enders		
2002	Sonny	Acid Yellow	Also director and producer	
2002	Adaptation	Charlie Kaufman / Donald Kaufman		
2003	The Life of David Gale	—N/a	Producer only	
2003	Matchstick Men	Roy Waller		
2004	National Treasure	Benjamin Franklin Gates		
2005	Lord of War	Yuri Orlov	Also producer	
2005	The Weather Man	David Spritz		
2006	The Ant Bully	Zoc	Voice role	
2006	World Trade Center	John McLoughlin		
2006	The Wicker Man	Edward Malus	Also producer	
2007	Ghost Rider	Johnny Blaze / Ghost Rider		
2007	Next	Cris Johnson	Also producer	
2007	National Treasure: Book of Secrets	Benjamin Franklin Gates		
2008	Bangkok Dangerous	Joe	Also producer	
2009	Knowing	John Koestler		
2009	G-Force	Speckles	Voice role	
2009	Bad Lieutenant: Port of Call New Orleans	Terence McDonagh		
2009	Astro Boy	Dr. Bill Tenma	Voice role	
2010	Kick-Ass	Damon Macready / Big Daddy		
2010	The Sorcerer's Apprentice	Balthazar Blake	Also executive producer	
2011	Season of the Witch	Behmen		
2011	Drive Angry	John Milton		
2011	Seeking Justice	Will Gerard		
2011	Trespass	Kyle Miller		
2011	Ghost Rider: Spirit of Vengeance	Johnny Blaze / Ghost Rider		
2012	A Thousand Words	—N/a	Producer only	
2012	Stolen	Will Montgomery		
2012	Can't Stand Losing You: Surviving the Police	—N/a	Producer only; documentary	
2013	The Croods	Grug Crood	Voice role	
2013	The Frozen Ground	Sgt. Jack Halcombe		
2013	Joe	Joe Ransom		
2014	Rage	Paul Maguire	Video on demand	
2014	Outcast	Gallain	Video on demand	
2014	Left Behind	Rayford Steele		
2014	Dying of the Light	Evan Lake	Video on demand	
2015	The Runner	Colin Pryce	Video on demand	
2015	Pay the Ghost	Mike Lawford	Video on demand	
2016	The Trust	Stone		
2016	Dog Eat Dog	Troy		
2016	Snowden	Hank Forrester		
2016	USS Indianapolis: Men of Courage	Captain Charles B. McVay III	Video on demand	
2016	Army of One	Gary Faulkner	Video on demand	
2017	Arsenal	Eddie King	Video on demand	
2017	Vengeance: A Love Story	John Dromoor	Video on demand; also producer	
2017	Inconceivable	Brian	Video on demand	
2017	Mom and Dad	Brent Ryan		
2018	Mandy	Red Miller		
2018	Looking Glass	Ray	Video on demand	
2018	The Humanity Bureau	Noah Kross	Video on demand	
2018	211	Mike Chandler	Video on demand	
2018	Teen Titans Go! To the Movies	Kal-El / Clark Kent / Superman	Voice role	
2018	Spider-Man: Into the Spider-Verse	Peter Parker / Spider-Man Noir	Voice role	
2018	Between Worlds	Joe Majors	Video on demand	
2019	Love, Antosha	Narrator	Voice role; documentary	
2019	A Score to Settle	Frank Carver	Video on demand; also executive producer	
2019	Colour Out of Space	Nathan Gardner		
2019	Running with the Devil	The Cook	Video on demand	
2019	Kill Chain	Araña	Video on demand	
2019	Primal	Frank Walsh	Video on demand	
2019	Grand Isle	Walter	Video on demand	
2020	Jiu Jitsu	Wylie	Video on demand	
2020	The Croods: A New Age	Grug Crood	Voice role	
2021	Prisoners of the Ghostland	Hero		
2021	Willy's Wonderland	The Janitor	Also producer	
2021	Pig	Robin "Rob" Feld	Also producer	
2022	The Unbearable Weight of Massive Talent	Nick Cage / Nicky Cage	Also producer, credited as Nicolas Kim Coppola	
2022	Butcher's Crossing	Miller		
2023	The Old Way	Colton Briggs	Video on demand	
2023	Renfield	Dracula		
2023	The Flash	Clark Kent / Superman	Cameo	
2023	Sympathy for the Devil	The Passenger	Also producer	
2023	The Retirement Plan	Matt Robbins		
2023	Dream Scenario	Paul Matthews	Also producer	
2024	Arcadian	Paul	Also producer	
2024	The Surfer	The Surfer	Also producer	
2024	Longlegs	Longlegs / Dale Ferdinand Kobble	Also producer	
2025	Gunslingers	Ben	Video on demand	
2025	The Carpenter's Son	The Carpenter	Also producer	
2026	Madden	John Madden		
2026	Best Pancakes in the County	S.O.B		
2026	Fortitude †	Duško Popov	Post-production	
2027	Lords of War †	Yuri Orlov	Post-production; Also producer	
2027	Spider-Man: Beyond the Spider-Verse †	Peter Parker / Spider-Man Noir	In-production	
TBA	The Prince †	The Pimp	Post-production	
TBA	Parish †	TBA	Post-production	
TBA	C.L.A.Y. †	TBA	Filming	

Key
†	Denotes films that have not yet been released

== Television ==
Nicolas Cage's television credits
Year	Title	Role	Notes	Ref(s)
1981	The Best of Times	Nicolas	Pilot; credited as Nicolas Coppola	
1992; 2012	Saturday Night Live	Himself	Host (1992); Weekend Update cameo (2012)	
1994	Hollywood Stars: A Century of Cinema	Himself	Documentary	
2007	The Dresden Files	—N/a	Executive producer only	
2021	History of Swear Words	Himself	Host; 6 episodes	
2026	Spider-Noir	Ben Reilly / The Spider	8 episodes; also executive producer	
TBA	True Detective	Henry Logan	Season 5	

== Video games ==
Nicolas Cage's television credits
Year	Title	Voice role	Ref(s)
2023	Dead by Daylight	Himself	
2026	Call of Duty: Black Ops 7 Call of Duty: Warzone	Himself	
