= Julie Ann =

Julie Ann or Julie Anne may refer to:

- Julie Ann Emery, American actress
- Julie Ann Taylor, American voice actress
- Julie Anne Smith, American actress professionally known as Julianne Moore
- Julie Anne San Jose, Filipina singer-songwriter
- Julie Anne Genter, New Zealand politician
- Julie Anne Haddock, American former child actress
