= Babes in Toyland (1986 film) =

1986 television film by Clive Donner

- Home video release poster
- Genre: Adventure; Family; Fantasy; Musical; Romance
- Based on: Babes in Toyland by Glen MacDonough
- Screenplay by: Paul Zindel
- Directed by: Clive Donner
- Starring: Drew Barrymore; Richard Mulligan; Eileen Brennan; Keanu Reeves; Jill Schoelen; Googy Gress; Pat Morita
- Theme music composer: Leslie Bricusse
- Country of origin: United States
- Original language: English

Production
- Executive producers: Bill Finnegan; Patricia Finnegan; Sheldon Pinchuk
- Producers: Tony Ford; Neil T. Maffeo
- Production location: Munich, Germany
- Cinematography: Arthur Ibbetson
- Editor: David Saxon
- Running time: 145 minutes (Broadcast); 94 minutes (Home media)
- Production companies: Orion Television; The Finnegan/Pinchuk Company; Bavaria Atelier Gmbh
- Budget: $5 million

Original release
- Network: NBC
- Release: December 19, 1986

Babes in Toyland is a 1986 American made-for-television Christmas musical film directed by Clive Donner, and starring Drew Barrymore, Richard Mulligan, Eileen Brennan, and Keanu Reeves. Based on the 1903 operetta of the same title by Victor Herbert and Glen MacDonough, this version features a new score by Leslie Bricusse along with select portions of Herbert's score.

Shot on location in Munich, West Germany, in summer 1986, it was broadcast on NBC on December 19, 1986 and released on VHS on November 21, 1992. The film was shortened to 94 minutes for overseas theatrical release; it is this version that received a worldwide home media release, leaving the original 145-minute cut unreleased.

== Plot ==
Lisa Piper, an eleven year old girl from Cincinnati, Ohio, cares for her family because her father's passing has made her grow up too fast. She has no time for toys, and refuses to be treated as a child. Her older sister Mary works in a toy store run by a man who is enraged when everyone leaves in anticipation of a blizzard on Christmas Eve. Mary and her boyfriend, Jack, are taking Lisa and their friend, George, home when the snowy roads cause an accident, where Lisa is thrown out of the car and transported to Toyland.

Lisa arrives just before Mary Contrary is to be wedded to the unpleasant Barnaby Barnacle, although Mary loves Barnaby's nephew, Jack Nimble. Lisa stops the wedding and, with her new friends, finds out that Barnaby plans to take over Toyland. Lisa, Mary, Jack and Georgie Porgie seek help from the kindly Toymaster, but he can only help them if Lisa really believes in toys. Barnaby confronts them, showing his true colors, and steals a flask containing distilled evil that the Toymaster had been collecting, before leaving Lisa and company to be eaten by Trollog, a vulture-like monster with a single enchanted eye that Barnaby uses to spy on enemies. They escape by blinding Trollog with paint and locking him in a chest, but are captured and imprisoned one by one in Barnaby's hidden fortress.

Barnaby reveals that he had been creating an army of trolls to take over Toyland, and attempts to corrupt his captives into being his servants with the contents of the flask, stating he would use it to make Mary his Troll Princess and transform Lisa into a monster akin to Trollog. However, Lisa proves to be immune to the evil, and reverses the effects on her friends. After escaping from Barnaby's stronghold, they return to the Toymaster. By now, Barnaby has ordered his trolls to attack Toyland, where they harass and capture residents. Lisa's newfound belief animates an army of life-sized toy soldiers created by the Toymaster, and they drive Barnaby and his goons Zack and Mack into the Forest of the Night.

Having lost control of his creatures and having failed at making Lisa his new Trollog, Barnaby is banished from Toyland for all of eternity. Jack and Mary are married, and Lisa is taken home by the Toymaster—who is revealed to be Santa Claus—in a sleigh with wooden reindeer. They travel the Milky Way until she wakes at home, as though it has all been a dream. However, she notices a toy soldier identical to the ones from Toyland standing under the Christmas Tree, which promptly salutes her.

== Cast ==
- Drew Barrymore as Lisa Piper
  - Linda Harmon provides Barrymore's singing voice.
- Richard Mulligan as Barnie / Barnaby Barnicle
- Eileen Brennan as Mrs. Piper / Widow Hubbard
- Keanu Reeves as Jack / Jack-be-Nimble
- Jill Schoelen as Mary Piper / Mary Contrary
- Googy Gress as George / Georgie Porgie
- Pat Morita as The Toymaster
- Walter Buschhoff as Justice Grimm
- Shari Weiser as Trollog
- Rolf Knie as Zack
- Gaston Haeni as Mack
- Pipo Sosman as Jack in the Box
- Chad Carlson as Joey
- Jean Moake as News Announcer
- Bill Marcus as Weather Announcer

== Musical numbers ==
1. "C-I-N-C-I-N-N-A-T-I" – Jack, Lisa, George and Mary
2. "Toyland" – Toyland chorus
3. "Let's Hear It!" – Georgie and Toyland chorus
4. "We'll Think of Something" – Lisa, Georgie and Mary
5. "It's the Feeling" – Mary and Jack
6. "Monsterpiece" – Barnaby
7. "I Live in Two Worlds" – Lisa
8. "C-I-N-C-I-N-N-A-T-I" (Reprise) – Lisa, Jack, Mary and Georgie
9. "Eyes of a Child" – Toymaster
10. "May the Years to Come" – Toyland chorus
11. "Eyes of a Child" (Reprise) – Toymaster and Lisa
12. "Toyland" – Lisa

== Release ==
The original 145-minute cut was never legally seen outside of television. However, through VHS recordings of these airings, it is currently available on YouTube, labeled as a "Director's Cut". The edited version, which was theatrically released in Europe, is available to stream on Amazon Prime Video. Many of the deleted scenes consisted of musical numbers such as "We'll Think of Something" and "It's the Feeling", and other transitional dialogue.

== See also ==
- List of Christmas films
