= Gary Faulkner =

Gary Faulkner may refer to:

- Gary Brooks Faulkner, construction worker and landlord captured in Pakistan in 2010 hunting for Osama bin Laden
- Gary Faulkner Jr., American ten-pin bowler
