= Mulligan's Stew =

American comedy-drama television series

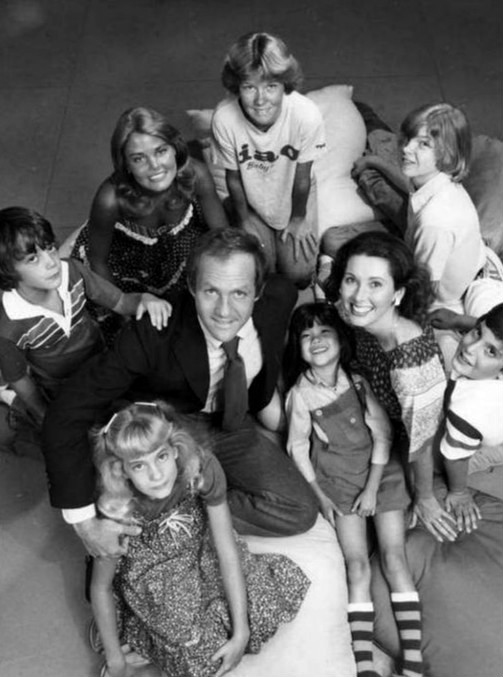
- The cast of Mulligan's Stew
- Genre: Comedy drama
- Created by: Joanna Lee
- Starring: Lawrence Pressman; Elinor Donahue; Johnny Doran; Christopher Ciampa; K.C. Martel; Julie Anne Haddock; Suzanne Crough; Sunshine Lee; Lory Walsh
- Country of origin: United States
- Original language: English
- No. of seasons: 1
- No. of episodes: 6 episodes

Production
- Running time: Pilot movie: 90 mins Series: 60 mins
- Production companies: Christiana Productions; Paramount Television

Original release
- Network: NBC
- Release: June 20, 1977
- Release: October 25 – December 13, 1977

Mulligan's Stew is an American comedy-drama television series, that originally aired as a 90-minute NBC television film on June 20, 1977, and later, as a 60-minute series from October 25 to December 13, 1977. The series focused on the lives of the Mulligan family, who live in the fictitious Southern California community of Birchfield; high school teacher and football coach, Michael (Lawrence Pressman), and his wife, Jane (Elinor Donahue). Jane is a school nurse.

== Synopsis ==
Michael and Jane Mulligan have three children: Mark, Melinda and Jimmy. They find making ends meet difficult, but manageable. Things get tighter moneywise and spacewise when the Mulligans take in their nephew Adam (Moose) and nieces Polaris (Polly) and Starshine (Stevie) Freedman, after their parents (Michael's sister and brother-in-law) are killed in a plane crash in Hawaii while in the process of adopting the Vietnamese-born Kimmy, leaving the Mulligans to finalize the adoption. They deal with the changes and bond as a family.

== Cast ==
- Lawrence Pressman as Michael Mulligan
- Elinor Donahue as Jane Mulligan, Michael's wife
- Johnny Whitaker (movie) / Johnny Doran (series) as Mark Mulligan, Michael & Jane's son
- Julie Anne Haddock as Melinda Mulligan, Michael & Jane's daughter
- K.C. Martel as Jimmy Mulligan, Michael & Jane's son
- Lory Koccheim Walsh as Polaris "Polly" Freedman, Michael & Jane's paternal niece
- Suzanne Crough as Stevie Freedman, Michael & Jane's paternal niece
- Christopher Ciampa as Adam "Moose" Freedman, Michael & Jane's paternal nephew
- Sunshine Lee as Kimmy Nguyen Freedman, Michael & Jane's adoptive paternal niece

== Episodes ==
No.	Title	Directed by	Written by	Original release date
TVM	"Mulligan's Stew"	Noel Black	Joanna Lee	June 20, 1977
1	"Biggest Mansion"	Unknown	Unknown	October 25, 1977
2	"Melinda Special"	Unknown	Unknown	November 1, 1977
3	"Winning the Big Ones"	Unknown	Unknown	November 8, 1977
4	"Little Grey Bird"	Unknown	Unknown	November 22, 1977
5	"Ah, Wilderness"	Unknown	Unknown	December 6, 1977
6	"The Perils of Being Pretty"	Unknown	Unknown	December 13, 1977

== Reception ==
Mulligan's Stew was scheduled opposite four Nielsen Top 15 hits: Three's Company and Soap on ABC, and M*A*S*H and One Day at a Time on CBS. As a result, it suffered from dismal ratings, and was cancelled at the end of 1977. It ranked dead last out of 104 shows airing that season with an average 10.5 rating.
