= The Stepfather (1987 film) =

1987 American psychological horror film

- Theatrical release poster
- Directed by: Joseph Ruben
- Screenplay by: Donald E. Westlake
- Story by: Carolyn Lefcourt; Brian Garfield; Donald E. Westlake
- Produced by: Jay Benson
- Starring: Terry O'Quinn; Jill Schoelen; Shelley Hack
- Cinematography: John W. Lindley
- Edited by: George Bowers
- Music by: Patrick Moraz
- Production company: ITC Productions
- Distributed by: New Century Vista Film Company
- Release date: January 23, 1987 (United States)
- Running time: 89 minutes
- Country: United States
- Language: English
- Box office: $2.5 million (US)

The Stepfather is a 1987 American psychological horror film directed by Joseph Ruben and starring Terry O'Quinn, Jill Schoelen, and Shelley Hack. O'Quinn stars as an identity-assuming serial killer who marries a widow with a teenage daughter. Having killed his previous family and changed his identity, his murderous tendencies continue after his stepdaughter becomes suspicious of him. The film is loosely based on the life of mass murderer John List, although the plot is more commonly associated with slasher films of the era. The film was written by Donald E. Westlake, from a story by Westlake, Carolyn Lefcourt and Brian Garfield (the latter of Death Wish fame), with an uncredited rewrite by David Loughery.

The film was theatrically released in the United States on January 23, 1987. It grossed $2.5 million at the box office and was well-received by critics. It has since gained a cult following and was followed by two slasher sequels, Stepfather II (1989) and Stepfather III (1993). A remake, also called The Stepfather, was released in 2009. It is the first installment in the The Stepfather film series.

== Plot ==
A man washes off blood in a bathroom, changes his appearance, puts his belongings into a suitcase, and leaves through the front door of his house, nonchalantly passing the butchered remains of his family. Boarding a ferry, he throws the suitcase containing the items from his former life overboard. One year later, that man — now a real estate agent using the name Jerry Blake — has married a young widow named Susan Maine and is living in a suburb of Seattle. Jerry's relationship with Susan's 16-year-old daughter Stephanie is strained. She is suspicious of Jerry's intentions, but Susan and Stephanie's psychiatrist, Dr. Bondurant, urge her to give Jerry a chance.

Meanwhile, Jim Ogilvie, the brother of Jerry's murdered wife, runs an article about his sister's death in the newspaper and attempts to find the man who killed her, who used the name Henry Morrison. While hosting a neighborhood barbecue, Jerry discovers the article and is disturbed by it. He goes into the basement and begins shouting maniacally, unaware that Stephanie is also in the room. Discovering his stepdaughter, Jerry claims he was simply letting off steam and tells her not to worry. Stephanie finds the article about the earlier killings and decides her stepfather might be the murderer. She writes to the newspaper requesting a photo of Henry Morrison, but Jerry intercepts it in the mail and replaces it with a stranger's photo, allaying her suspicions.

Curious about Stephanie's stepfather, who has refused to meet him, Dr. Bondurant makes an appointment with Jerry under an assumed name, saying he wants to buy a house. During their meeting, Bondurant asks too many personal questions and Jerry realizes that Bondurant is not who he says he is. Believing Bondurant is investigating him, Jerry beats him to death with a plank, puts him in Bondurant's car, and sets the car on fire. Jerry later informs Stephanie of Bondurant's death, claiming he was in a car accident, and succeeds in bonding with her. However, Jerry's newfound relationship with his stepdaughter is cut short when he catches her kissing her boyfriend Paul. Jerry angrily accuses Paul of attempting to rape Stephanie, driving Paul away. Stephanie also runs off when Susan says Jerry is her father, which she angrily denies, causing Susan to slap her. That incident also drives Jerry to anger. The next day, Jerry quits his job and starts creating a new identity for himself in another town. He begins courting another single mother while planning to murder Susan and Stephanie.

Having figured out the town where Jerry could be living, Jim begins going door to door in search of his former brother-in-law. After Jim stops by, Susan phones the real estate agency to tell Jerry that someone was looking for him, only to be informed that Jerry quit several days ago. Susan asks Jerry about this, but while explaining himself to Susan, he confuses his identities. Realizing his mistake, Jerry bashes Susan on the head with the phone and pushes her down the basement stairs. Assuming Susan is dead, Jerry sets out to kill Stephanie.

Jim, who has realized that Jerry is the man who killed his sister's family, arrives wielding a revolver, but Jerry stabs him to death before Jim can shoot him. After terrorizing Stephanie, Jerry corners her in the attic, only to fall through the weak floor into the bathroom. Before he can kill Stephanie, Susan appears and shoots Jerry twice, but he is still able to reach his knife. Stephanie wrests it away and stabs him in the chest. He weakly utters "I love you" before tumbling down the stairs. Stephanie later cuts down a birdhouse that she and Susan had helped Jerry install.

== Cast ==
- Terry O'Quinn as Jerry Blake / Henry Morrison / Bill Hodgkins / The Stepfather
- Jill Schoelen as Stephanie Maine
- Shelley Hack as Susan Maine
- Charles Lanyer as Dr. A. Bondurant
- Stephen Shellen as Jim Ogilvie
- Stephen E. Miller as Al Brennan
- Robyn Stevan as Karen
- Jeff Schultz as Paul Baker
- Lindsay Bourne as Art Teacher
- Anna Hagan as Mrs. Leitner
- Gillian Barber as Annie Barnes
- Blu Mankuma as Lieutenant Jack Wall
- Jackson Davies as Mr. Chesterton
- Sandra Head as Receptionist
- Gabrielle Rose as Dorothy Rinehard
- Richard Sargent as Mr. Anderson
- Margot Pinvidic as Mrs. Anderson
- Rochelle Greenwood as Cindy Anderson
- Don S. Williams as Mr. Stark
- Don MacKay as Joe
- Dale Wilson as Frank
- Gary Hetherington as Herb
- Andrew Snider as Mr. Grace
- Marie Stillin as Mrs. Fairfax
- Paul Batten as Mr. Fairfax
- Sheila Paterson as Dr. Barbara Faraday

== Production ==
=== Development ===
The film was inspired by the crimes of John List. Carolyn Lefcourt found a newspaper article about how List killed his own family and brought it to Brian Garfield. Donald E. Westlake collaborated with them to write the story and based his screenplay on that. ITC Entertainment hired Joseph Ruben to direct as they were impressed with his directorial effort on Dreamscape. After coming on board, Ruben collaborated with Westlake on polishing the script and adding stronger scenes such as where Stephanie spies on Jerry having a tantrum in the basement. Ruben also changed the character of an investigating cop into Jim Ogilvie who was the brother of one of Jerry's previous victims as a way of giving the character a driven reason to pursue Jerry.

=== Casting ===
According to Ruben, there was an effort to secure a name actor for the titular role but no one they approached was interested. In addition to the actors voicing their discomfort with the extreme nature of the material, Ruben theorized they may have also been worried about typecasting affecting their careers much in the way Anthony Perkins' role in Psycho affected his career. With name actors off the table, Ruben began looking for character actors, on his first audition Terry O'Quinn impressed producers with his reading of a scene in which Jerry is upset at hearing a guest at a barbecue discussing a newspaper article of Jerry's previous crimes which leads to him using the newspaper to make a paper hat for a little boy with the producers impressed by the immersive way in which he mimed the folding of the hat going beyond what was expected in the audition process.

=== Filming and post-production ===
Filming started on October 16, 1985 in Vancouver, British Columbia, Canada and by July 1986 the film was in post-production searching for a distributor company. Eventually The Stepfather gained a deal with New Century Vista Film Corporation.

== Music ==
=== Soundtrack ===
- "Run Between the Raindrops" – Pat Benatar
- "Sleeping Beauty" – Divinyls
- "I Want You" – Patrick Moraz and John McBurnie
- "Gwine to Rune All Night (De Camptown Races)" – Stephen Foster

== Release ==
=== Home media ===
The film was released on DVD for the first time in North America by Shout! Factory on October 13, 2009. Shout! Factory released the Blu-ray version of the film on June 15, 2010.

== Reception ==
=== Box office ===
The Stepfather was initially marketed as a psychological thriller. When audiences did not respond to this as well as New Century would have liked, they marketed it as a slasher film. The film was theatrically released in the United States on January 23, 1987. During its opening weekend, The Stepfather grossed $260,587 in 105 theatres. Ultimately playing in 148 theatres, it earned a total US gross of $2.5 million.

=== Critical response ===
The Stepfather has an 89% approval rating from Rotten Tomatoes and an average rating of 7/10 out of 37 reviews. Metacritic, which uses a weighted average, assigned the film a score of 72 out of 100, based on 15 critics, indicating "generally favorable" reviews.

Film critic Roger Ebert with the Chicago Sun-Times gave the movie 2.5 stars out of 4 and wrote, "Violence itself seems to sell at the box office, even when it's divorced from any context. Maybe that's what the filmmakers were thinking. What often happens, though, is that in an otherwise flawed film there are a couple of things that are wonderful. The Stepfather has one wonderful element: Terry O'Quinn's performance."

Terry O'Quinn was nominated for both a Saturn and an Independent Spirit Award. O'Quinn came in third place in the voting for the 1987 National Society of Film Critics Award for Best Actor. Director Ruben was honored with the Critics Award at the 1988 Cognac Festival. The film was nominated for the International Fantasy Film Award for Best Film at the 1990 Fantasporto, and included in Bravo's 100 Scariest Movie Moments at spot #70.

Describing it as a cult film, Scott Tobias interprets the film as a critique of Reaganism.

=== Accolades ===
Award	Category	Nominee	Result
Saturn Award	Best Actor	Terry O'Quinn	Nominated
Critics Award		Joseph Ruben	Won
Edgar Award	Best Motion Picture	Donald E. Westlake	Nominated
International Fantasy Film Award	Best Film	Joseph Ruben	Nominated
Independent Spirit Award	Best Male Lead	Terry O'Quinn	Nominated
National Society of Film Critics Award	Best Actor	Terry O'Quinn	3rd place
Young Artist Award	Best Young Actress in a Horror Motion Picture	Jill Schoelen	Nominated
Young Artist Award	Teenage Favorite Horror/Drama Motion Picture	The Stepfather	Nominated

== Franchise ==
=== Sequels ===
The film was followed by the sequel Stepfather II in 1989, which opened to negative reviews. The TV movie Stepfather III was released in 1993, with the title character played by another actor.

=== Remake ===
A remake titled The Stepfather was released in 2009 to negative reviews.

=== Second remake ===
Another remake titled Stepfather was released in 2026 on Tubi. This film features Taye Diggs as the title character. The film received mixed to negative reviews.
