= Jill Schoelen =

American actress (born 1963)

- Born: March 21, 1963 (age 63); Burbank, California, U.S.
- Occupations: Actress, musician
- Years active: 1981–present
- Spouse: Anthony Marinelli (m. 1993; div. 2002)
- Children: 2

Jill Schoelen (born March 21, 1963) is an American actress. She is best known for Chiller (1985), The Stepfather (1987), Cutting Class (1989), The Phantom of the Opera (1989), Popcorn (1991), Rich Girl (1991), and When a Stranger Calls Back (1993). For her numerous horror film appearances, she is widely regarded as a scream queen.

== Career ==
Schoelen’s theatrical debut was in the 1981 TV pilot The Best of Times, which starred Crispin Glover and Nicolas Cage. Schoelen went on to star in such movies as D.C. Cab (1983), Chiller (1985), That Was Then... This Is Now (1985), Babes in Toyland (1986), The Stepfather (1987), Billionaire Boys Club (1987 TV miniseries), Cutting Class (1989), The Phantom of the Opera (1989), Popcorn (1991), When a Stranger Calls Back (1993), and There Goes My Baby (1994).

She guest starred on episodes of T. J. Hooker, Little House on the Prairie, Murder, She Wrote, Diagnosis: Murder, Sara, Hell Town, and Aaron Spelling’s The Heights (1992). In 1988, Sean Penn cast her in a dramatic play he wrote and directed, The Kindness of Women. Schoelen and Penn worked together again on stage, starring opposite each other in David Rabe’s Hurlyburly (1988/1989), in a production that David Rabe also directed.

In 2009, she released her debut album, Kelly’s Smile, a jazz album that is composed of songs related to her childhood friend, Kelly Troup, who grew up across the street from Schoelen.

== Personal life ==
Schoelen was born in Burbank, California. She dated Keanu Reeves during the time they starred in Babes in Toyland (1986). She was engaged to Brad Pitt for three months in 1989. In 1993, Schoelen married film composer Anthony Marinelli, and soon after retired from her acting career to be a stay-at-home mother for her two sons with Marinelli, whom she eventually divorced.

== Filmography ==
=== Films ===
Year	Film	Role	Director	Notes
1983	D.C. Cab	Claudette	Joel Schumacher	
1984	Hot Moves	Julie Ann	Jim Sotos	
1985	Thunder Alley	Beth	J.S. Cardone	
1985	That Was Then... This Is Now	Angela Shepard	Christopher Cain	
1987	The Stepfather	Stephanie	Joseph Ruben	
1989	Curse II: The Bite	Lisa Snipes	Fred Goodwin	
1989	Cutting Class	Paula Carson	Rospo Pallenberg	
1989	The Phantom of the Opera	Christine Day	Dwight H. Little	
1991	Popcorn	Maggie	Mark Herrier	
1991	Rich Girl	Courtney	Joel Bender	
1992	Adventures in Spying	Julie Converse	Hil Covington	
1992	State of Mind	Wishman	Reginald Adamson	
1994	There Goes My Baby	Babette	Floyd Mutrux	
1996	Not Again!	Jenny	Fred Kennamer	
2004	She Kept Silent	Yalena	Svetlana Cvetko	Short film
TBA	Mr. Christmas	Heather	Matthew Bellamy	

=== TV ===
Year	Title	Role	Notes
1981	The Best of Times	Jill	Television pilot
1982	Little House on the Prairie	Jane Canfield	9.10 "Love"
1983	Great Day	Carla Simpson	Television film
1983	T.J. Hooker	Kelly Hobbs	2.17 "Sweet Sixteen and Dead"
1983	Happy Endings	Anne Marie Bartlett	Television film
1985	Sara	Emily	1.11 "Girls Just Want to Have Fun"
1985	Chiller	Stacey	Television film
1985	Hell Town	Shelley	1.2 "The People vs. Willy the Goat"
1986	Shattered Spirits	Allison	Television film
1986	Babes in Toyland	Mary Piper / Mary Contrary	Television film
1987	Billionaire Boys Club	Amy Whitehall	Television film
1988	CBS Schoolbreak Special	Amy Fletcher	6.2. "Gambler"
1989	Murder, She Wrote	Flora Gerakaris	5.16 "Truck Stop"
1992	The Heights	Betty B.	1.6 "Fear of Heights"
1993	When a Stranger Calls Back	Julia Jenz	Television film
1993	Triumph Over Disaster: The Hurricane Andrew Story	Ruth Henderson	Television film
1994	Diagnosis: Murder	Becky Garfield	1.17 "Shaker"
2021	Fault	Shelley	

== Radio and podcast appearances ==
Schoelen appeared on Ken Reid's TV Guidance Counselor podcast on August 10, 2016.
