= Julie Piekarski =

American actress (1963-)

- Born: January 2, 1963 (age 63); St. Louis, Missouri, U.S.
- Occupation: Actress
- Years active: 1977–present
- Known for: The Facts of Life; The New Mickey Mouse Club
- Spouse(s): John Probst (1986–2017)
- Children: 3

Julie Ann Piekarski (born January 2, 1963) is an American actress, best known for her role as Sue Ann Weaver on The Facts of Life.

Piekarski was born in St. Louis, Missouri. She got her first big break in show business as a Mouseketeer on The New Mickey Mouse Club in 1977. After gaining popularity working for Disney, she was cast as Sue Ann Weaver as an original cast member of The Facts of Life from 1979–1981. When the network decided to retool the show, Piekarski and several other members of the original cast were let go. She appeared as her character occasionally over the next couple of seasons and in a reunion episode in 1986. She went on to appear in several television shows, mainly making guest appearances, most notably on Diff'rent Strokes, General Hospital, Quincy, M.E., and Three's Company.

After a brief stint as an entertainment reporter on KPLR-TV in St. Louis, Piekarski was married to dentist John Probst from 1986 to 2017. They resided near St. Louis with their three children.

== Filmography ==
Film and Television
Year	Title	Role	Notes
1977–78	The New Mickey Mouse Club	Herself / Mouseketeer	130 episodes Main cast (Season 1–2)
1977	The Wonderful World of Disney	Herself / Mouseketeer	Episode: "The Mouseketeers at Walt Disney World"
1979	Diff'rent Strokes	Sue Ann Weaver	Episode: "The Girls School"
1979–81, 1986	The Facts of Life	Sue Ann Weaver	17 episodes Main cast (Season 1) Recurring role (Season 2–3) Guest star (Season 8)
1981	The Best of Times	Julie	Episode: Pilot
1981	The Miracle of Kathy Miller	Carol	Television film
1982	Quincy, M.E.	Julie	Episode: "Bitter Pill"
1983	Three's Company	Julie Lipton	Episode: "Janet's Little Helper"
1983	ABC Afterschool Specials	Sarah	Episode: "Have You Ever Been Ashamed of Your Parents?"
2020	The Importance of Doubting Tom	Sally	
2021	Pilot Season	Rebecca Montgomery	Episode: "The Nuclear Option"
2022	Doubting Tom	Sally	

== Awards and nominations ==
Year	Award	Category	Nominated work	Result
2008	TV Land Awards	Favorite Character(s) Who "Went Missing" Shared with: (Felice Schachter, Julie Anne Haddock and Molly Ringwald)	The Facts of Life	Nominated
