= The Best Times =

- Genre: Drama
- Written by: Seth Freeman; Michele Gallery
- Directed by: Seth Freeman (1 episode, 1985); Edward Zwick (1 episode, 1985); Arthur Allan Seidelman (unknown episodes)
- Starring: Janet Eilber; Beth Ehlers; Jim Metzler; Jay Baker; Liane Alexandra Curtis; Darren Dalton; LaSaundra Hall; Tammy Lauren; David Packer; K.C. Martel; Melora Hardin
- Country of origin: United States
- Original language: English
- No. of seasons: 1
- No. of episodes: 6

Production
- Executive producer: Seth Freeman
- Producers: Michele Gallery; Michael Vittes
- Running time: 60 minutes
- Production companies: Beechwood Productions; Lorimar Productions

Original release
- Network: NBC
- Release: April 19 – June 24, 1985

The Best Times is an American drama series that originally aired on NBC in 1985.

== Summary ==
The show was about single mother/widow Joanne Braithwaite returning to teach English at Southern California's John F. Kennedy High School. Joanne's daughter, Mia just started at JFK High School, trying hard to fit in. Joanne found support in science teacher Mr. Dan Bragen. The students of JFK High were jock Tony, tough girl Annette, former high school dropout Chris, Dionne & Giselle, who were part-time workers at a fast-food restaurant called The Potato Palace, Neil "Trout" Troutman, who was the Potato Palace's night manager, Trout's girlfriend, Joy, and Trout's younger, troublemaker brother, Dale. The show focused on problems such as drugs and premarital sex.

== Cancellation ==
The show only lasted a season, ending on June 24, 1985, and was revised from an earlier 1984 pilot called Things Are Looking Up.

== Cast ==
- Janet Eilber as Ms. Joanne Braithwaite
- Beth Ehlers as Mia Braithwaite
- Jim Metzler as Mr. Dan Bragen
- Jay Baker as Tony Younger
- Liane Alexandra Curtis as Annette Dimetriano
- Darren Dalton as Chris Henson
- LaSaundra Hall as Dionne McAllister
- Tammy Lauren as Giselle Kraft
- David Packer as Neil "Trout" Troutman
- K. C. Martel as Dale Troutman
- Melora Hardin as Joy Villafranco

== Episodes ==
No.	Title	Original release date
1	"Making Out"	April 19, 1985
2	"Volleyball"	April 26, 1985
3	"The Narc"	May 3, 1985
4	"Snake Meat"	May 10, 1985
5	"The Crash"	May 31, 1985
6	"Sweetheart"	June 7, 1985
