= Heaven Help Us =

1985 film by Michael Dinner

- Theatrical release poster
- Directed by: Michael Dinner
- Written by: Charles Purpura
- Produced by: Mark Carliner; Dan Wigutow
- Starring: Andrew McCarthy; Mary Stuart Masterson; Kevin Dillon; Malcolm Danare; Kate Reid; Wallace Shawn; John Heard; Donald Sutherland
- Cinematography: Miroslav Ondříček
- Edited by: Stephen A. Rotter
- Music by: James Horner
- Production companies: HBO Pictures; Silver Screen Partners
- Distributed by: Tri-Star Pictures
- Release date: February 8, 1985
- Running time: 104 minutes
- Country: United States
- Language: English
- Box office: $6 million

Heaven Help Us (also known as Catholic Boys) is a 1985 American comedy-drama film directed by Michael Dinner. It stars Andrew McCarthy, Mary Stuart Masterson, Kevin Dillon, Malcolm Danare, Patrick Dempsey (in his film debut) and Stephen Geoffreys as a group of Brooklyn teenagers, with Jay Patterson, Wallace Shawn, John Heard and Donald Sutherland as the teachers and administrators at the private Catholic school the boys attend in the 1960s.

== Plot ==
In 1965, Boston teenager Michael Dunn and his young sister Boo have been sent to Brooklyn to live with their Irish-Catholic grandparents following the deaths of their parents. Dunn is enrolled at St. Basil's, a strict all-boys Catholic school. His grandmother Martha is determined to see him fulfill his parents' dream of him joining the priesthood. Dunn befriends Caesar, an overweight, bespectacled student who enjoys reading and excels academically. Caesar helps Dunn catch up with the rest of the class, but because of their association, foul-mouthed bully and school troublemaker Ed Rooney pranks Dunn outside of the soda fountain across the street from school.

After Rooney pulls a prank on Caesar, teacher Brother Constance attempts to get Dunn to identify the prankster by striking Dunn's open palms with a paddle. Fed up with Dunn's refusal to rat out the perpetrator, Constance shoves him to the floor. Dunn lunges towards Rooney and the pair are separated. Dunn and Rooney are sent to the office of the headmaster, Brother Thadeus. Rooney, impressed by Dunn's refusal to snitch, attempts to patch things up between them, but Dunn wants nothing to do with him. After school, Rooney tells Dunn that if they do not become friends, he will have to continue in his harassment in order to save face. Reluctantly, Dunn befriends Rooney and his friends, sex obsessed Williams and naive Corbet.

Dunn also befriends Danni, a teenaged girl who runs the soda fountain across from the school and cares for her mentally infirm father. Danni's fountain shop is raided numerous times by the Brothers, who wish to catch St. Basil's students misbehaving. The raids leave the shop in shambles. After one raid, Dunn helps Danni clean things up, sparking a romance.

At the sacrament of confession, Caesar enters the confessional, but Father Abruzzi becomes preoccupied with another student Perrin's misbehavior. Rooney enters the priest's booth and hears Caesar's confession that he plagiarized an assignment, giving him the penance of befriending Rooney and making sure he gets passing grades. As a result, Caesar tutors and befriends Rooney.

The relationship between Dunn and Danni further develops, culminating in a kiss under the boardwalk at the beach. One day, during one of the Brothers' routine raids, Danni takes a stand and locks them out. The Brothers leave, but later contact social services. A few days later, Dunn and his friends see police cars and a few of the Brothers surrounding the soda fountain door as Danni's father is led out in handcuffs. Dunn rushes in and finds that social workers are preparing to take Danni away. A shaken Dunn takes Danni in his arms. Weeping, she wants him to promise that he won't be sad over her departure.

An angry Rooney develops another prank with the help of Caesar, Williams and Corbett to get back at the Brothers for having Danni taken away. The boys sneak onto school grounds at night and cut the head off the statue of St. Basil. During a school assembly the next day, Rooney presents Dunn with a duffel bag containing the missing head. Brother Constance sees the bag and accosts the boys into the gym, where Constance hits Corbet and Williams with a leather strap in an attempt to extract a confession for the vandalism. Caesar presents Constance with a doctor's note, presumably to exempt him from corporal punishment. Constance drags the cowering Caesar to the floor, beating him with the strap. Dunn angrily shoves Constance to the floor and then flees, with Constance and the other boys following him. The chase ends in the auditorium during the assembly. Constance backhands Dunn and calls him a bastard. Dunn then retaliates by delivering an uppercut to Constance, knocking him to the floor and causing pandemonium as the student body rises to its feet and cheers.

Thadeus suspends all five boys for two weeks. He then presents Constance, who he claims started the altercation, with an order that he be transferred to another assignment where he will not work with children. The five boys walk out of the school downtrodden, but then joyfully realize that they will not have to attend school for two weeks.

== Cast ==
- Andrew McCarthy as Michael Dunn
- Mary Stuart Masterson as Danni
- Kevin Dillon as Ed Rooney
- Malcolm Danare as Caesar
- Jennie Dundas as Boo Dunn
- Kate Reid as Grandma Martha
- Wallace Shawn as Father Abruzzi
- Jay Patterson as Brother Constance
- John Heard as Brother Timothy
- Donald Sutherland as Brother Thadeus
- Dana Barron as Janine
- Philip Bosco as Brother Paul
- Calvert DeForest as Bridge Operator
- Patrick Dempsey as Corbet
- Christopher Durang as Priest
- Stephen Geoffreys as Williams
- Richard Hamilton as Grandpa
- Paul Marchand as Perrin
- Vic Polizos as Police Officer
- Douglas Seale as Brother Dominic
- Yeardley Smith as Cathleen
- Jimmy Ray Weeks as Danni's Father

== Production ==
=== Development ===
The story was originally written in 1978 as a masters thesis by Charles Purpura, a student at NYU, who had attended Catholic boys' schools. An NYU teacher showed the script, then titled Catholic Boys, to producer Dan Wigutow, who tried unsuccessfully to interest production companies in it. Purpura dropped out of NYU and was fired from his job at a lithography shop for union organizing. He was denied unemployment benefits because his nighttime screenwriting was considered potentially lucrative employment, so he filed for bankruptcy, borrowed money and headed for India.

The script was read by producer Mark Carliner, who wanted to finance further work on it. Wigutow had to contact Purpura in India via telegram. The writer began doing further drafts. Carliner then met Michael Dinner, a former recording artist who had just made a film at the American Film Institute, a version of Nathaniel West's Miss Lonelyhearts which had aired on American Playhouse. Carliner gave Dinner $10,000 to enable him to travel with Miss Lonelyhearts to the Cannes Film Festival, figuring it was "bread cast upon the water". Dinner became attached to direct Catholic Boys.

On the plane to Cannes, Dinner met Maurice Singer, chief of HBO Films, the new theatrical film division of HBO. By the time the plane landed in Europe, Singer had agreed to finance Catholic Boys. Tri-Star came on to distribute. Dinner said "When you're a new director you hear from a lot of people that you're a genius but it doesn't mean very much. I was happy to be getting any firm assignment."

=== Casting ===
Dinner said "I came into this very idealistically, wanting to discover eight brand new faces who could play 16 and 17 year olds. But it didn't work out that way." He spent four months looking for actors around the country, including Boston and Philadelphia, but ended up casting them all out of New York via their agents. "What happens here is that you stumble on kids with some stage experience who also seem natural as New York kids. What happens in Los Angeles is that even the good ones come off like Valley kids."

Mary Stuart Masterson was cast after Dinner saw a tape she had made at the Sundance Institute, where Masterson had spent two summers in an acting company. Masterson was cast while the film began production, and she would rehearse on weekends with Dinner and Andrew McCarthy.

=== Filming ===
Filming took nine weeks. The Church of St. Michael (built 1921) and the (now closed) St. Michael's Parish School were used as the fictional St. Basil's Church and St. Basil's School, run by the factual Order of St. Basil. Filming used external and internal shots of this church and school, Carroll Street Bridge, and around the neighborhood. An auditorium scene was filmed using students from Cardinal Spellman High School in the Bronx.

John Heard later claimed an incident on the film led to him being unofficially blacklisted for a time.

One afternoon when I was sitting there talking to another actor. I think it was Jay Patterson or somebody. I'm a Catholic, and I still hang around with guys I went to high school with... I leaned over and I said, “I don't understand: Why in the world would they get a Jew to direct a Catholic boys movie?” And the director—Michael Dinner... —was sitting right behind me. [Laughs.] And then it turned out that I'm part Jewish! My grandfather was Jewish. I mean, it may have sounded like I was being anti-Semitic, but I was really just sort of being... Catholic boys are kind of vain. They think of themselves as being unique, so why would we want to be directed by a Jewish person? But I probably didn't work again after that for two years or something.

== Release ==
The film was originally shot as Catholic Boys, but due to HBO and Tri-Star's fears of alienating viewers, the title was changed to Heaven Help Us. In European territories and in Australia, the film was released theatrically under its original title. To make the film more upbeat, there were changes made to a plot involving Brother Timothy (Heard), a disenchanted teacher, and the addition of a spoken epilogue.

== Reception ==
The film received mixed reviews and was not a commercial success. In a review that awarded the film two and ½ stars, Roger Ebert expressed that while he found some scenes were funny and contain “moments of real insight and memory,” he found the tone to be inconsistent. Janet Maslin of The New York Times was more positive, writing the filmmakers “have an unusually good feeling for the time, the place, the characters as kids and the adults they later turned into”.

McCarthy later called the film "a very lovely movie that twelve people saw" and described it as "my favorite and/or the best movie I did in that whole era of those movies." The marketing was believed to have misled audiences about the film, indicating it was more of a typical teen film. "I'm a first-time director, and all I can do is stamp my foot, so to speak," said Michael Dinner. "Besides, in terms of offending anyone, I'm more worried about Elvis fans." (The film contains an unflattering excerpt from Blue Hawaii.) FilmInk called the film "part of Andrew McCarthy's ‘soulful teens’ trilogy (along with Pretty in Pink and Class)."

Heaven Help Us holds a 33% rating on Rotten Tomatoes based on nine reviews. Audiences polled by CinemaScore gave the film an average grade of "C" on an A+ to F scale.
