= Julie Anne Haddock =

American actress, music exec (b.1965)

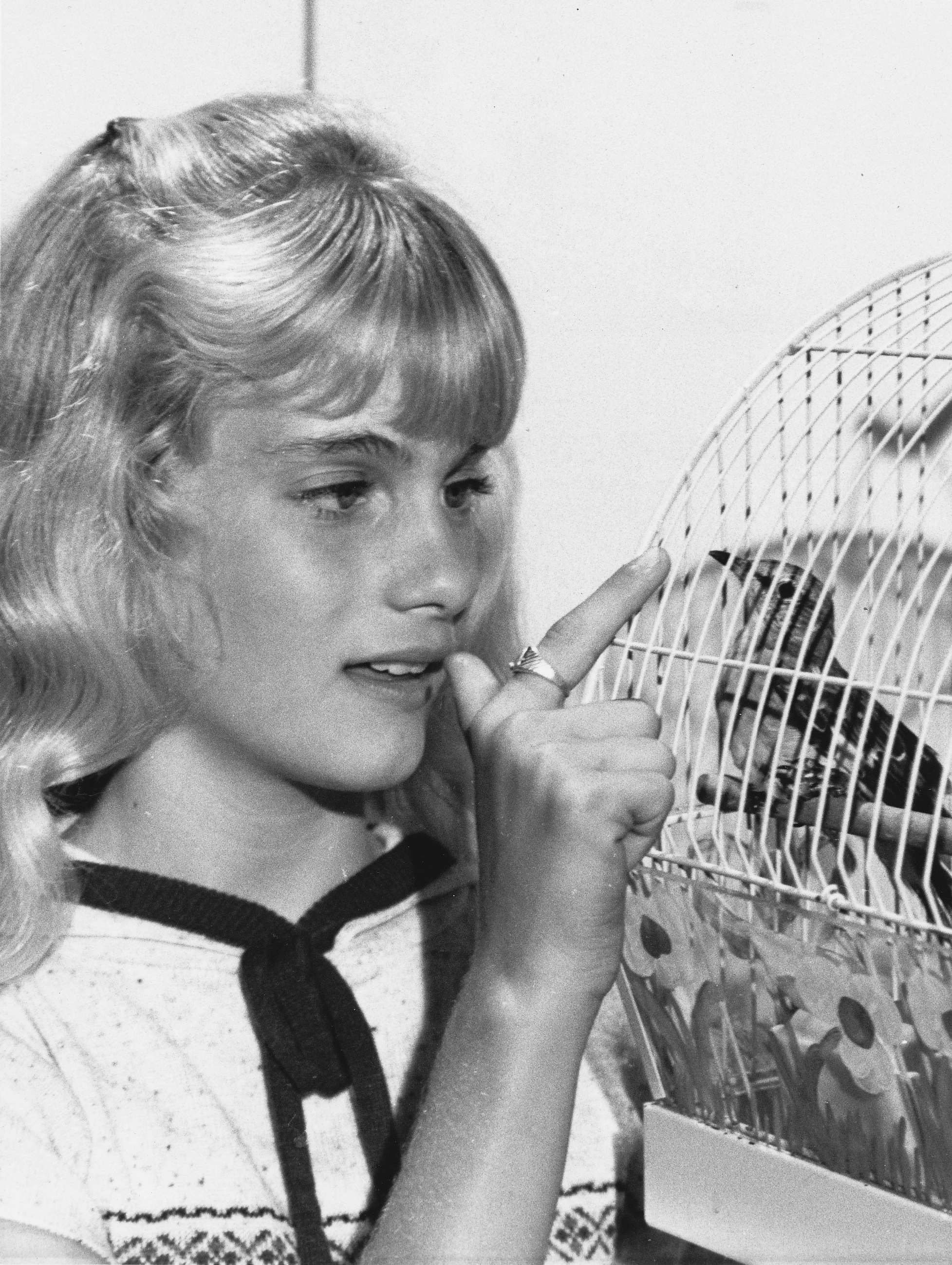
- Haddock in 1977
- Born: April 3, 1965 (age 61); Los Angeles, California, U.S.
- Other names: Julie Ann Haddock; Julie Anne Haddock Becker; Julie Haddock Becker; Jules Becker
- Occupation: Actress
- Years active: 1974–present
- Known for: The Facts of Life; Mulligan's Stew; The Great Santini
- Spouse: Eric Becker (m. 1997)
- Children: 1

Julie Anne Haddock (born April 3, 1965) is an American actress, music executive, and producer.

== Career ==
Becoming a child actress at the age of eight, Haddock is perhaps best known for her role as tomboy Cindy Webster on the first season of the NBC television series The Facts of Life. She is also known for her appearance on the Wonder Woman television series as the superpowered girl Tina / Amadonna in the episode "The Girl from Ilandia" and as Robert Duvall's daughter in the movie The Great Santini. She also appeared in the main cast of two NBC series that were both cancelled mid-season of their first year: in 1977, she played Melinda Mulligan, the daughter of Lawrence Pressman and Elinor Donahue, on Mulligan's Stew; in 1983 she appeared on Boone, starring Tom Byrd. She also appeared in an episode of Little House on the Prairie, as Amelia Bevins.

In 2008, Haddock, along with Molly Ringwald, Felice Schachter, and Julie Piekarski, was nominated for a TV Land Award, in the category Favorite Characters Who "Went Missing".

== Filmography ==
Films
| Year | Title | Role | Notes |
|---|---|---|---|
| 1975 | The World Through the Eyes of Children | Dawn | |
| 1977 | Mulligan's Stew | Melinda Mulligan | TV movie |
| 1979 | Like Normal People | Amy | TV movie |
| 1979 | The Great Santini | Karen Meechum | |
| 1979 | Scavenger Hunt | Michelle Motley | |
| 1982 | Hollywood’s Children | Self | TV documentary movie |
Television
| Year | Title | Role | Notes |
| 1974 | Dirty Sally | Girl | Episode: “I Never Saw the Pacific” |
| 1977 | Mulligan's Stew | Melinda Mulligan | Main cast |
| 1978 | The New Adventures of Wonder Woman | Tina | Episode: "The Girl from Ilandia" |
| 1978 | Little House on the Prairie | Amelia Bevins | Episode: "The Man Inside" |
| 1979 | Hello, Larry | Phyllis | Episode: "The New Kid" |
| 1979–81, 1986 | The Facts of Life | Cindy Webster | 17 episodes Main cast (Season 1) Recurring role (Season 2–3) Guest star (Season 8) |
| 1980 | Diff'rent Strokes | Cindy Webster | Episode: "The Slumber Party" |
| 1981 | Gimme a Break! | Silver Slipper President | Episode: "Julie's Rejection" |
| 1982 | Star-Studded Spoof of the New TV Season, G-Rated, with Glamour, Glitter and Gags | Self | TV special |
| 1983 | Boone | Amanda | Main cast |
| 2020 | Behind Closed Doors | Self - Cindy Webster (as Julie Anne Haddock Becker) | Episode: “The Facts of Life” |

== Awards and nominations ==
| Year | Association | Category | Work | Result |
|---|---|---|---|---|
| 1984 | Young Artist Awards | Best Young Actress in a Drama Series | Boone | Nominated |
| 1985 | Young Artist Awards | Best Young Supporting Actress in a Daytime or Nighttime Drama | Boone | Nominated |
| 2008 | TV Land Awards | Favorite Character(s) Who "Went Missing" (Shared with: Felice Schachter, Molly Ringwald and Julie Piekarski) | The Facts of Life | Nominated |
