= K. C. Martel =

Canadian former child actor (born 1967)

- Born: Kevin Christopher Martel; September 14, 1967 (age 58); Ottawa, Ontario, Canada
- Occupation: Actor
- Years active: 1977–1992
- Children: 2

Kevin Christopher Martel (born September 14, 1967) is a Canadian former child actor. He is best-known for his appearances on American film and television between 1977 and 1992. His film roles include E.T. the Extra-Terrestrial and The Amityville Horror, he also had regular roles in the television shows Growing Pains, Mulligan's Stew, The Best Times, and Eight is Enough.

== Career ==
=== Television ===
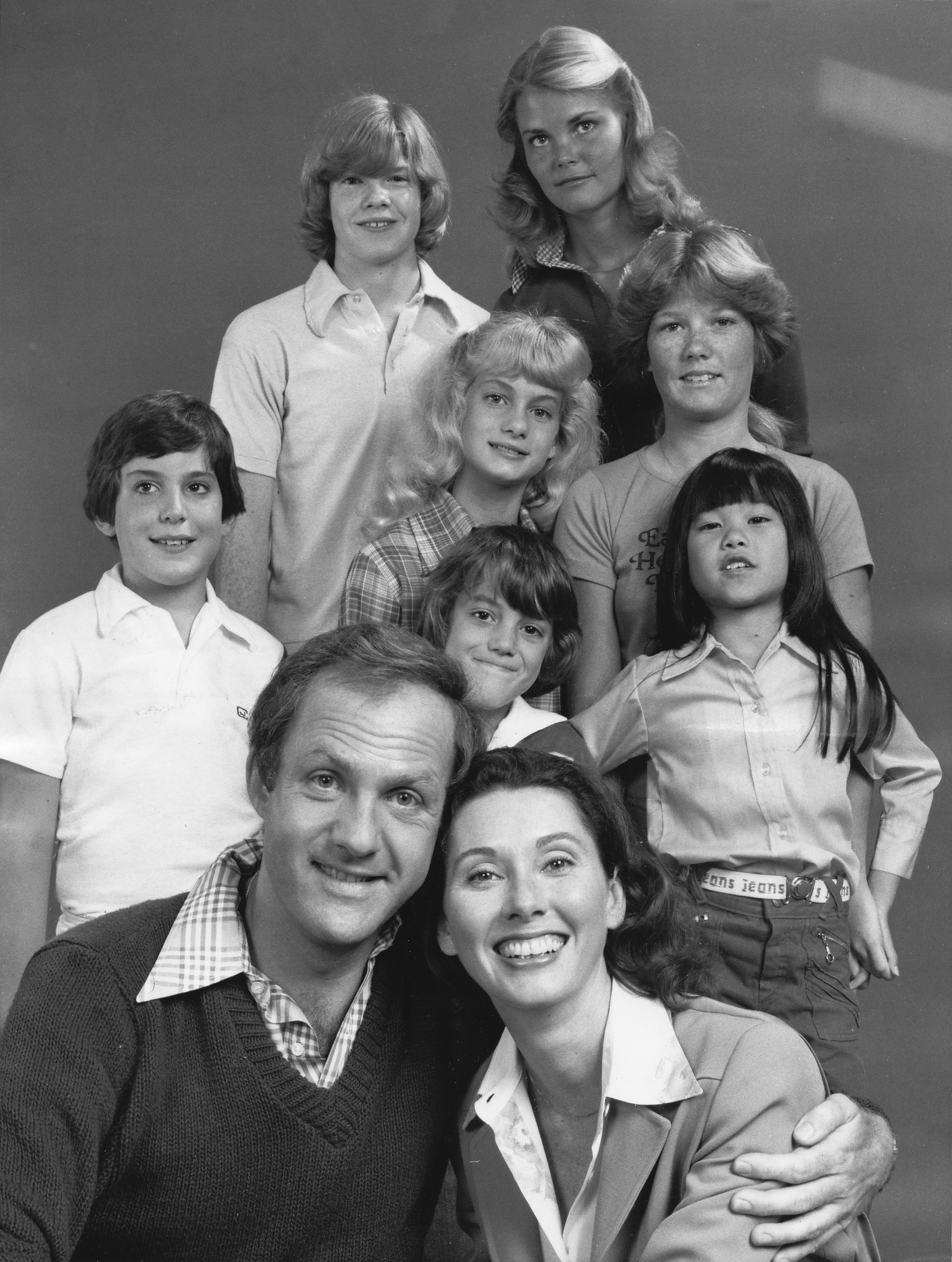
Martel (second row, middle) as part of Mulligan's Stew

The Canadian-born Martel made his television debut in an episode of the superhero series Wonder Woman in 1977. His first big role came the same year as Jimmy Mulligan in the short-lived NBC family sitcom Mulligan's Stew, of which only the pilot and six episodes were filmed.

From 1979 to 1980, he had a recurring guest role as Marvin in eight episodes of Eight is Enough. In the 1981 television film The Munsters' Revenge, based on the series The Munsters, he played the werewolf Eddie Munster, son of the actors Fred Gwynne and Yvonne De Carlo.

In 1985, he appeared in six episodes of the short-lived drama series The Best Times. Between 1985 and 1992, Martel also held a recurring role over all the seven seasons of the sitcom Growing Pains. He played Eddie Ziff, a friend of main character Mike Seaver (played by Kirk Cameron). Overall, Martel appeared in more than 20 telvesion shows and about 10 television films.

=== Film ===
Martel made his feature film debut in 1979 in the horror film The Amityville Horror, playing Greg, one of the two sons of the Lutz family who move into a haunted house. In 1981, he made his second film appearance with a large role in the slasher movie Bloody Birthday.

In 1982, he appeared in Steven Spielberg's film classic E.T. the Extra-Terrestrial as Greg, one of the three friends of Robert MacNaughton's character Michael who take part in the final bicycle chase of the film. In 1987, Martel had his fourth and last cinema role as George in the drama White Water Summer alongside Kevin Bacon and Sean Astin.

== Life after acting ==
After the end of Growing Pains in 1992, Martel retired from acting. He received a Bachelor's degree in Psychology and later a Master's degree in Marriage, Family, and Children's Therapy. He works today in the field of wealth management.

Martel is married and has two children. In 2022, he was part of an E.T. reunion at the annual Turner Classic Movies film festival.

== Filmography ==
Year	Title	Role	Notes
1977	Wonder Woman	Ted	TV series，Season 2，Episode 5
1977	Mulligan's Stew	Jimmy Mulligan	TV series, 6 episodes
1977	Mad Bull	Alex Karkus	TV movie
1978	The Bob Newhart Show	Kid	TV series，Season 6，Episode 18
1978	Having Babies III		TV movie
1979	The Power Within	Small Boy	
1979	The Amityville Horror	Greg Lutz	
1979	Portrait of a Stripper	Mark Hanson	TV movie
1979	Fantasy Island	Mitch Lee	TV series，Season 3，Episode 10
1979	You Can't Do That on Television	K.C.	TV series
1980	The Associates	Stevie #1	TV series，Season 1，Episode 9
1980	Fugitive Family	Andy Roberts	TV movie
1978-1980	CHiPs	Jason / Scott	TV series，2 episodes
1980	Beulah Land	Young Benjamin	TV miniseries
1979-1980	Eight Is Enough	Marvin	TV series，8 episodes
1981	The Munsters' Revenge	Eddie Munster	
1981	Trapper John, M.D.	Scott	TV series，Season 2，Episode 14
1981	Bloody Birthday	Timmy Russel	
1982	E.T. the Extra-Terrestrial	Greg (Elliott's friend)	Movie
1982	ABC Weekend Specials	Streeter	TV series，Season 5，Episode 5
1982	CBS Afternoon Playhouse	Max Welsh	TV series，Season 5，Episode 2
1981-1983	One Day at a Time	Bernie	TV series，Season 8，Episode 9、15
1983	St. Elsewhere	Vinnie	TV series，Season 2，Episode 7
1984	Gimme a Break!	Danny	TV series，Season 3，Episode 16
1984	Things Are Looking Up	Dale Troutman	TV movie
1984	Silver Spoons	Bobby	TV series，Season 3，Episode 1
1984	Highway to Heaven	Larry Everett	TV series，Season 1，Episode 11
1985	The Best Times	Dale Troutman	TV series，6 episodes
1987	Shell Game	Eddie	TV series，Season 1，Episode 6
1987	White Water Summer	George	
1987	ABC Afterschool Specials	Brad (ages 13–18)	TV series，Season 16，Episode 2
1985-1992	Growing Pains	Eddie	TV series，19 episodes
