= Malcolm Danare =

American actor

- Born: June 15, 1962 (age 64); Los Angeles, California, U.S.
- Occupation: Actor
- Years active: 1983–present

Malcolm Danare (born June 15, 1962) is an American actor, known for his role of Caesar in the 1985 film Heaven Help Us and Dr. Mendel Craven in the 1998 film Godzilla and its animated series follow up. He is also known for voicing Kipling in Monster High and voicing Tiny of Ever After High.

== Career ==
Malcolm Danare had never been in front of a camera before he played the role that earned him a Golden Globe nomination. This debut role was Poteete in Paramount Pictures’ movie The Lords of Discipline, for which he was nominated for Best Newcomer. Danare's next film for Paramount was the iconic Flashdance.

Malcolm went on to star and co-star in a diverse collection of films: Mel Brooks’s Robin Hood: Men in Tights, Walter Hill’s Crossroads, Amy Heckerling’s European Vacation, Michael Dinner’s Heaven Help Us (a.k.a. Catholic Boys), Bob Clark and Mark Herrier’s Popcorn, and John Carpenter’s horror classic Christine. Malcolm also co-starred in Columbia Pictures’ Godzilla and its animated television series.

From 2004 to 2006, Malcolm recurred in the hit CBS series CSI: Miami playing the villain Ned Ostroff.

In 2008, Malcolm wrote the critically acclaimed play, In Heat.

In 2014, Malcolm starred in Smothered, a horror farce directed by John Schneider. He co-starred in American Justice, a crime drama, and The Martini Shot, a 2023 drama film directed by Stephen Wallis.

In addition to acting, Danare has also recently discovered he has a knack for producing. He produced several films set to be released in 2016: The Summerland Project, a futuristic science fiction piece; The Taker, a modern-day horror film; and WTF (World Thumb-Wrestling Federation), a comedy spoof. He also co-starred in the latter two.

As a voiceover actor, Malcolm currently plays Kipling in the hit cartoon series Monster High. He is also the voice of Tiny in Nickelodeon's Ever After High.

== Filmography ==
=== Film ===
- The Lords of Discipline (1983, as Poteete)
- Flashdance (1983, as Cecil)
- Christine (1983, as Moochie Welch)
- Heaven Help Us (1985, as Caesar)
- European Vacation (1985, as The Froeger's Son)
- The Curse (1987, as Cyrus)
- Popcorn (1991, as Bud)
- Robin Hood: Men in Tights (1993, as Inept Archer)
- Independence Day (1996, as Intellectual on Roof)
- Godzilla (1998, as Dr. Mendel Craven)
- Monster High: Escape from Skull Shores (2012, as Kipling)
- True Bromance (2012, as Gary)
- Ever After High (2013, as Tiny)
- Smothered (2014, as Self)
- American Justice (2014, as Stuckey)
- The Martini Shot (2014, as Alexander Balthazar)
- WTF - World Thumb Wrestling Federation (2016, as Jakob Rozenbaum)
- The Taker (2016, as Conner)
- Amelia 2.0 (2017, as Adam)
- Dog and Pony Show (2018, as Wally the Horse)
- Bullet Shot (2019, as Alexander Balthazar)
- Beverly Hills Broke (2020, as Marty Stern)
- Chastise (2021, as Professor Mooch)
- Deadly Draw (2022, as Emory Bodkin)

=== Television ===
- Father Dowling Mysteries (1989, 1 episode, as Ted)
- Knight & Daye (1989, 1 episode, as Jeremy)
- Godzilla: The Series (1998–2000, 40 episodes, as Dr. Mendel Craven)
- CSI: Miami (2004–06, 2 episodes, as Ned Ostroff)
