= Monster High: Escape from Skull Shores =

2012 Monster High TV/film special

- Based on: The Monster High Skull Shores fashion doll line by Mattel
- Written by: Mike Montesano; Ted Zizik
- Screenplay by: Mike Montesano; Ted Zizik; Audu Paden; Lauren Rose; Ira Singerman
- Directed by: Steve Ball; Andrew Duncan
- Voices of: Laura Bailey; Ogie Banks; Cam Clarke; Malcolm Danare; Debi Derryberry; Erin Fitzgerald; Kate Higgins; Jonathan Lipow; George Newbern; Audu Paden; America Young; Cindy Robinson; Salli Saffioti; Keith Silverstein; Evan Smith
- Music by: Steven Argila
- Countries of origin: United States; Canada
- Original language: English

Production
- Producers: Tina Chow; Maria Elena Rodriguez; Ira Singerman
- Running time: 46 minutes
- Production companies: Mattel Entertainment; Nerd Corps Entertainment

Original release
- Network: Nickelodeon
- Release: April 13, 2012

Related
- Monster High: Why Do Ghouls Fall in Love?; Monster High: Ghouls Rule

Monster High: Escape from Skull Shores is an animated adventure fantasy television film special produced by Nerd Corps Entertainment and released on April 13, 2012 on Nickelodeon in the United States.

It is the 4th television/film special based on the Monster High doll line by Mattel and it is tied to its dedicated Skull Shores line, which was released separately from the production. Universal Pictures released it alongside Monster High: Fright On on July 1, 2014 as part of a branded Monster High: Clawesome Double Feature Blu-ray release.

== Plot ==
For spring break, Lagoona Blue invites her friends to come with her to the Great Scarrier Reef. On the way, the ship is destroyed by a kraken, leaving the students on a small raft made from their luggage. They are soon rescued by Bartleby Farnum, an eccentric human showman, and Kipling, his assistant who wears a sack over his head, and taken to an island called Skull Shores, where they are welcomed by the local Tiki tribe.

Suspicious, Lagoona and Gil enter Farnum's boat and find a recording of a creature that Farnum is obsessed with capturing: the Beast of Skull Shores, and the explorer who befriended it and resembles Frankie, leading them to surmise that Farnum is plotting to use Frankie as bait to capture it. At night, the beast appears and grabs Frankie, who is at first frightened, until she realizes that he means no harm. Farnum and the Tiki launch their attack, but the beast escapes with Frankie. The Tiki force Ghoulia Yelps and Abbey Bominable into a pitfall trap, while Clawdeen Wolf, Draculaura, and Cleo De Nile escape. Farnum splits up the Tiki in two groups, and Lagoona and Gil return shortly afterwards, setting off to save Frankie on their own.

The next morning, Frankie meets a light purple monster named Andy, who reveals that he and the beast are the same creature, and that he transforms into it when experiencing negative emotions from himself and others, which lead him to isolate himself on Skull Shores to live in peace. Meanwhile, Clawdeen, Cleo, and Draculaura follow the trail, while Abbey and Ghoulia trick the Tiki in the village into releasing them and accept their apologies before teaming up with them. In the jungle, Lagoona and Gil spy on Farnum and realize that he has a tracking device in Frankie's necklace, when Lagoona is captured by him, causing Gil to flee.

Meanwhile, Andy and Frankie reunite with Clawdeen, Draculaura, and Cleo, only to be interrupted by Farnum. Abbey and Ghoulia appear with the Tiki, and convince the rest of the Tiki to turn on Farnum, but he uses his cane to pull Frankie to him. Andy transforms into his giant form, but he finds that he must comply with Farnum's orders and reverts back to turn himself in, which delights Farnum about his nature. Farnum then forces Andy onto his boat, but Gil appears with a pod of dolphins and the kraken, who throws Farnum into the jungle and sinks his boat. As the students and Andy sail back to Monster High, Gil explains to Lagoona that he went to the Great Scarrier Reef to ask Lagoona's parents, who talked to the kraken, who subsequently agreed to save the students and fix their boat, delighting Lagoona. Meanwhile, Farnum and Kipling watch from a distance.

With Spring Break over, the students try to introduce Andy to Monster High. At first, Andy is unfamiliar with modern technology due to his isolation, but he soon starts feeling welcome despite being worried about being accepted. Later, Bloodgood orders everyone to the auditorium for a speech by a human guest speaker. However, the man reveals himself to be Farnum, causing Andy to transform and take Frankie before escaping. Farnum then orders Andy to turn himself back in, but Frankie convinces the latter that he belongs at Monster High despite his differences. Realizing that Frankie is right, Kipling takes off his sack, revealing his large ears, and throws Farnum into a tar pit, with Farnum getting covered in feathers from a passing flock of birds which stick to the tar, and arrested by the humans.

Afterwards, Kipling becomes uncertain about being accepted as well, until he spots two female students who also have large ears. Bloodgood then announces that, due to the damages done to the school, Spring Break is extended with a week to get reparations done, much to the students’ delight. On recommendation by Abbey, the entire student body enjoys the extended vacation on Skull Shores with the Tiki.

== Voice cast ==
- Laura Bailey as Lagoona Blue and Headmistress Bloodgood
- Ogie Banks as Clawd Wolf
- Cam Clarke as Heath Burns and Anonymous Ghost
- Malcolm Danare as Kipling
- Debi Derryberry as Draculaura
- Erin Fitzgerald as Abbey Bominable and Spectra Vondergeist
- Kate Higgins as Frankie Stein
- America Young as Howleen Wolf, Toralei Stripe and Elephant Girl
- Jonathan Lipow as The Tikis
- George Newbern as Andy Beast
- Audu Paden as Ghoulia Yelps, Manny Taur and Nightmare
- Cindy Robinson as Jackson Jekyll/Holt Hyde and Operetta
- Salli Saffioti as Clawdeen Wolf and Cleo de Nile
- Keith Silverstein as Bartleby Farnum
- Evan Smith as Deuce Gorgon, Gil Webber, Mike and Ted

== Reception ==
Grace Montgomery from Common Sense Media offered a parental advisory that the film depicted teens as ghouls, goblins, and ghosts, [but] they are "more silly than sinister," and while the film offers a "strong message about tolerance," the message is "partially undermined by the over-the-top sexy outfits and makeup sported by the female characters, who are otherwise pretty decent role models." They also appraised by it having only "mild references to adult relationships and a little cartoon violence, this short tale should be OK for grade-schoolers and up." Conclusions included "It's campy and a little cheesy and full of every cringe-worthy joke and pop-culture reference about monsters they could fit in, but there's something endearing about the classmates of Monster High," and summarized "Although it's not to be expected that the ghoulish girls of Monster High would be dressed like your average teen, it's a shame they have to be decked out to the nines. With a little more clothing and a lot less makeup, many of the female characters would be stellar role models, without detracting from the plot." Enios M. Duarte at Hi-Def Digest gave a review of the TV/film special, claiming that it had him "surprisingly engaged" during its runtime."

== Release titles by language ==
- Monster High: La Bête de l'Île au Crâne (French)
- Monster High: Kalokairines monster peripeteies (Greek)
- Monster High: Fuga dall'isola Teschio (Italian)
- Monster High: Escape de Playa Calavera (Spanish)
