= The Miracle of Kathy Miller =

- Genre: Drama
- Written by: Ethel Brez; Mel Brez
- Directed by: Robert Michael Lewis
- Starring: Sharon Gless; Frank Converse; Helen Hunt
- Theme music composer: Patrick Williams
- Country of origin: United States
- Original language: English

Production
- Producers: Bernard Rothman; Jack Wohl
- Cinematography: Michael D. Margulies
- Editor: Les Green
- Running time: 98 min.
- Production companies: Rothman/Wohl Productions; Universal Television

Original release
- Network: CBS
- Release: October 5, 1981

The Miracle of Kathy Miller is a 1981 American made-for-television drama film based on the real-life story of a Scottsdale, Arizona teenager who was critically injured in a 1977 car accident. Helen Hunt, in an early starring role, plays the title part; Frank Converse and Sharon Gless are cast as Kathy's parents. Kathy, a high school track and field athlete, overcame the severe mental and physical injury to compete in and finish a long-distance race (shown at the climax of the film). The distributor was Universal TV.

== Primary Cast ==
- Helen Hunt as Kathy Miller
- Frank Converse as Larry Miller
- Sharon Gless as Barbara Miller
- Bill Beyers as Larry Don Miller
- John de Lancie as Dr. Christiansen
- Michele Greene as Sherrie
- Rance Howard as Dr. Jewell
- Julie Piekarski as Carol
- William Forsythe as Mark
