= Popcorn (1991 film) =

1991 American horror film

- Theatrical release poster
- Directed by: Mark Herrier
- Screenplay by: Tod Hackett
- Story by: Mitchell Smith
- Produced by: Ashok Amritraj; Gary Goch; Torben Johnke
- Starring: Jill Schoelen; Tom Villard; Dee Wallace Stone; Derek Rydall; Elliot Hurst; Kelly Jo Minter; Malcolm Danare; Ivette Soler; Freddie Marie Simpson; Ray Walston; Tony Roberts
- Cinematography: Ronnie Taylor
- Edited by: Stan Cole
- Music by: Paul Zaza
- Production companies: Movie Partners; Trans-Atlantic Pictures
- Distributed by: Studio Three Film Corporation
- Release date: February 1, 1991
- Running time: 91 minutes
- Country: United States
- Language: English
- Budget: $9 million
- Box office: $4.7 million

Popcorn is a 1991 American slasher film directed by Mark Herrier and written by Alan Ormsby. It stars Jill Schoelen, Tom Villard, Tony Roberts, Dee Wallace, and Derek Rydall. The plot follows a group of college students holding a film festival, where they are then stalked and murdered by a deranged killer inside a movie theater.

== Plot ==
Film student and screenwriter Maggie Butler has recurring dreams of a girl named Sarah, caught in a fire and chased by an assailant. She documents these on an audio tape in the hopes of making them into a film.

Maggie's classmate Toby D'Amato proposes hosting a horror movie marathon to raise funds for the film department, to be held at the abandoned Dreamland theater. He enlists the help of Dr. Mnesyne, who lends them film memorabilia from his shop.

In his inventory, they find a short cult film called Possessor, which resembles Maggie's dreams. Lanyard Gates, the director, killed his family while shooting the final scene, then set the theater on fire. When Maggie asks her mother Suzanne about the film, she dismisses it, urging Maggie to quit the festival. Later, Suzanne receives a call from someone who tells her to meet them at Dreamland and bring a gun. Once there, she has visions and is attacked by a shadowy figure.

The night of the festival, a suspicious man buys a ticket from Maggie and calls her "Sarah" before entering. Maggie tells Toby, but he dismisses it. The first movie is a 3D film, Mosquito. Mr. Davis prepares a giant mosquito prop, but while he's flying it above the audience, a mysterious figure causes it to fly into him, stabbing him with its stinger. In a laboratory, an unknown being then makes a copy of Davis's face.

The second film is The Attack of the Amazing Electrified Man, featuring a "Shock-o-Scope" gimmick consisting of electrical "buzzers" in seats. Bud, a student who uses a wheelchair, prepares the seat shockers as Maggie re-listens to her audio tape and hears a message from "Gates". Backstage, Mark's date Tina attempts to kiss Davis, but his face melts off and he strangles her. The killer then straps Bud into an electric chair prop for the film and electrocutes him, shutting off the theater's electricity.

Maggie is confronted by Gates and realizes that she is Sarah Gates, that Lanyard is her father, and that Suzanne is actually her aunt who rescued her from the Possessor fire long ago. She flees and explains this to Toby, believing Gates has returned for her. After Toby and Maggie enter the basement and restore the power, he disappears and she is again confronted by Gates.

When the power returns, Maggie is strapped to a chair in the killer's lair. Toby, revealed to be the killer, explains that he was badly burned as a child while attending the Possessor screening with his mother, who was in Gates' film cult and was killed that night. Blaming Maggie and Suzanne, he plans to exact revenge on them by re-enacting the final scene of Possessor on stage tonight.

The third film is The Stench, in "Odorama". Joanie, realizing she's behind for her Odorama cue, leaves to join Leon. Meanwhile, Toby shows Maggie that he has encased Suzanne in a full body cast, pointing her gun. Leon goes to the restroom and is met by a doppelgänger who locks him in a stall and triggers a lethal poisonous gas, killing him. Dressed as Leon, Toby returns to the booth with plans to stab Joanie but storms out when she mentions her unrequited love for Toby.

Mark arrives at Toby's apartment to find that he is being evicted. The walls are plastered with articles of the Possessor incident, including pictures of his facial reconstruction and Maggie with scissors in her eyes. Horrified, Mark rushes back to the theater.

The final scene of Possessor is simultaneously being screened and re-created on stage: Maggie is locked in a metal dress, and despite her pleas to be saved, the audience believes it is a part of the act. Mark uses the mosquito track to zip line onto the stage, causing the mosquito to swing around unlatched and stab Toby in the chest, killing him. Mark releases Maggie and Suzanne as the crowd erupts in applause.

== Cast ==
- Jill Schoelen as Maggie
- Tom Villard as Toby
- Dee Wallace as Suzanne
- Derek Rydall as Mark
- Malcolm Danare as Bud
- Kelly Jo Minter as Cheryl
- Ivette Soler as Joanie
- Elliott Hurst as Leon
- Freddie Marie Simpson as Tina
- Tony Roberts as Mr. Davis
- Ray Walston as Dr. Mnesyne
- Karen Lorre as Joy
- Mat Falls as Lanyard Gates
- Barry Jenner as Lt. Bradley
- Suzanne Hunt as Dr. Latimer
- Robert Stickman as Skeeter
- Thom Adcox-Hernandez as Corky
- Bruce Glover as Vernon
- Munair Zacca as Doctor
- Lori Creevay as Marge (Peggy)
- Will Knickerbocker as Landlord / Warden
- Cindy Breakspeare as Gloria Gates
- Giana Hanly as Sarah Gates

== Production ==
The film was executive produced by Howard Hurst, a Toronto based real estate magnate.

Adamant about not directing another horror film after Black Christmas (1974), Bob Clark passed on the offer to helm the film and instead suggested his collaborator on Deathdream (1974), Alan Ormsby. Clark, an uncredited producer for Popcorn, also acted as a "hands-on" filmmaker throughout production and served as a second unit director when needed. Popcorn was filmed entirely in Kingston, Jamaica.

Ormsby was replaced by Porky's actor Mark Herrier a few weeks into filming. The cast and crew later speculated that Ormsby was fired for being too "detail-oriented" in the creation of the "film within a film" marathon movies. While Ormsby is credited with directing all three, Herrier is credited with filming the present-day portions of Popcorn.

Concurrent with Ormsby's dismissal, the original lead actress, Amy O'Neill, was replaced by Jill Schoelen.

== Analysis ==
According to John Kenneth Muir, the film's succinct title reflects a trend in the horror films of the 1990s. Unlike horror film titles of the previous decades, such as The Last House on the Left (1972), The Texas Chain Saw Massacre (1974), or A Nightmare on Elm Street (1984), Muir perceives the 1990s to have been characterized by more laconic titles like Popcorn, The Guardian (1990), Hideaway (1995), and Scream (1996). He believes this trend was a result of the studio desire for generic, wide-appeal films.

Furthermore, Muir argues that the film itself is an example of the postmodernist, self-reflective horror films of that period. Popcorn took inspiration from the history of the horror films, from the 1950s onwards, inspiring films like Wes Craven's New Nightmare (1994) and In the Mouth of Madness (1995) which used metafiction as one of their themes.

Muir writes that the films-within-a-film in Popcorn serve as an homage to the low-budget horror films of the 1950s and to the gimmicks of William Castle. Mosquito has similarities to the films of Jack Arnold. Nuclear weapons testing has caused desert mosquitoes to grow into giant monsters, in a plot resembling Them! (1954) and The Deadly Mantis (1957). The film includes stock characters and situations, such as a dedicated lady scientist and the military insisting on using a nuclear weapon to annihilate the monster. The gimmick accompanying Mosquito is a life-sized version of the giant mosquito which slides down a rope above the heads of the film audience. This is a tribute to Emergo, the Castle-devised gimmick accompanying House on Haunted Hill (1959). The original gimmick featured a glowing skeleton sliding down a rope. The title of The Attack of the Amazing Electrified Man seems to be a homage to The Amazing Colossal Man (1957), while the visual style of this film is similar to the works of William Cameron Menzies. It includes influences from German Expressionism, with "exaggerated shadows and menacing low-angles". The accompanying gimmick, "Shock-o-Scope", seems to be a rename of Percepto, the electric gimmick which accompanied The Tingler (1959). The Stench is fashioned after Japanese films, imported and dubbed for the American market. Its accompanying gimmick is an obvious variation of Smell-O-Vision, the gimmick used in Scent of Mystery (1960). Possessor features extreme close-ups, and functions as a mix between a snuff film and a product of psychedelia. Its protagonist Lanyard Gates has similarities to cult leader Charles Manson.

The frame story of Popcorn is that of a typical slasher film. The killer impersonates his victims through use of masks, and his goal is the performance of a snuff-show in front of a live audience. His motivation lies in a crime of the past which scarred him for life. Maggie serves as the final girl of the film, accompanied by a heroic boyfriend. As to the identity of the killer, the film employs a suitable red herring for misdirection. Muir observes, however, that the film does not use slasher films themselves as part of its self-reflecting depiction of the horror genre. The characters do not appear to be aware of the relevant tropes, nor do they seem aware of their presence in a slasher film-like situation, unlike their counterparts in Scream and I Know What You Did Last Summer (1997).

The film includes multiple scenes of supernatural horror, which are explained by the presence of Lanyard Gates spirit haunting the Theater after his film is played and who appears to Maggie multiple times. In one of these scenes, Suzanne, Maggie's mother, arrives at Dreamland to confront Lanyard Gates, gun in hand. As if in response, the letters of the movie theater's marquee fall on the ground and in their place appears a new sign: Possessor the name of Gates film, alluding to the fact his spirit has been unleashed .

== Release ==
=== Box office ===
Popcorn was not a box office success and performed poorly during its opening weekend. The film debuted with a tally of $2,563,365 from 1,055 screens and ended its domestic box office run with $4,656,759.

=== Home media ===
Popcorn was initially released on VHS in June 1991. Variety reported in 1993 that home video sales equaled $2,043,179.

Elite Entertainment released a DVD edition of Popcorn in 2001. Special features include theatrical trailers, TV spots and promotional footage.

A Region A (US/Canada) Blu-ray/DVD combo was released by Synapse Films on March 7, 2017.

== Reception ==
On the review aggregator website Rotten Tomatoes, the film has an approval rating of 43% based on 23 reviews, with an average rating of 5.8/10. Metacritic, which uses a weighted average, assigned the film a score of 51 out of 100, based on 10 critics, indicating "mixed or average" reviews.

Vincent Canby of The New York Times called it "the best spoof of its kind since Alligator." Kevin Thomas of the Los Angeles Times called it an "ingenious and spoofy little shocker" and "A Nifty Tribute to Its Genre". Owen Gleiberman of Entertainment Weekly gave the film a grade of "B", writing, "Though it isn't even trying to scare you, this is a very nifty black-comic horror movie, one of the rare entries in the genre with some genuine wit and affection." Richard Harrington of The Washington Post wrote that it "has several good ideas that, unfortunately, go unrealized." Stephen Hunter of The Baltimore Sun wrote, "Popcorn isn't too clever by half, but only by seven-sixteenths. It's so busy being droll and ironic it forgets to be any good." Chris Hicks of the Deseret News wrote, "On the whole, Popcorn is so amateurish in its development, with pseudo-hip dialogue that drops movie references every few lines, it winds up being neither scary nor funny." Gary Thompson of the Philadelphia Daily News felt that while the film spoofs were inspired, the rest of the film was much worse.

Reviewing the 2001 DVD release, Adam Tyner of DVD Talk called it "a wildly entertaining movie", and Patrick Naugle of DVD Verdict called it "a fun little flick."

In 2011, author John Kenneth Muir opined that Popcorn was a conglomeration of two distinct films: one being a smart, postmodern film that "self-reflexively gazes back at genre conventions and gimmickry", and the other a rather derivative revival of 1980s slashers that lacks the self-awareness and intelligence of the more postmodern half.
