= Kelly Jo Minter =

American actress (born 1966)

- Minter, 2008.
- Born: September 24, 1966 (age 60); Trenton, New Jersey, U.S.
- Occupation: Actress
- Years active: 1983–present
- Known for: Yvonne Miller – A Nightmare on Elm Street 5: The Dream Child; Maria – The Lost Boys; Ruby Williams – The People Under the Stairs
- Spouse: Georgio Allentini (m. 1992)
- Children: 4

Kelly Jo Minter (born September 24, 1966) is an American actress. Minter made her acting debut in 1983, portraying Angela in an episode of the third season of Fame called "Break Dance". She made her film debut as Lorrie in Mask (1985). She subsequently portrayed Denise Green in Summer School (1987), Maria in The Lost Boys (1987), Charlotta in Miracle Mile (1988), Yvonne Miller in A Nightmare on Elm Street 5: The Dream Child (1989), LaDonna in House Party (1990), Cheryl in Popcorn (1991), and Ruby Williams in The People Under the Stairs (1991). Outside of film, Minter has made guest appearances on a variety of television series including Hill Street Blues (1987), A Different World (1988), Martin (1993), ER (1996), Providence (2001), and Strong Medicine (2002). In 2010, she appeared as herself in the documentary Never Sleep Again: The Elm Street Legacy.

== Early life ==
Minter was the youngest of nine children in a middle-class, Catholic household. Due to her mother, a pharmaceutical supplies salesperson, traveling for work, Minter left home at age 14 to live on her own, before ending up in juvenile hall and girls homes.

== Career ==
Minter began her career in entertainment behind the scenes as a grip on mainstream and pornographic films. It led her to getting onscreen acting roles in film and television.

In 1983, Minter portrayed Angela in an episode of the third season of Fame called "Break Dance". In 1984, she portrayed Carla in the television short The Pilot. In 1985, Minter made her film acting debut as the prostitute Lorrie in the drama film Mask. She starred alongside Cher, Sam Elliott, and Eric Stoltz. The film earned positive reviews and was a financial success. The same year, she portrayed Kelly on an episode of the television series T.J. Hooker called "Street Bait" and Rachel Torres in the television film Badge of the Assassin.

In 1986, Minter portrayed Toni in the television film Charley Hannah and Vicky in an episode of Walt Disney's Wonderful World of Color called "The Deacon Street Deer". In 1987, Minter portrayed Kathy in an episode of Hill Street Blues called "It Ain't Over Till It's Over" and Denise Green, a dyslexic teenager, in the comedy film Summer School. For her work in this film, Minter received an NAACP Image Award nomination for Outstanding Supporting Actress in a Motion Picture in 1987. The same year, Minter portrayed Maria in Joel Schumacher's cult horror comedy film The Lost Boys. She subsequently portrayed Treena Lester in The Principal. The following year, she portrayed Charlotta in Steve De Jarnatt's apocalyptic thriller Miracle Mile and Charisse in two episodes of the television series A Different World.

In 1989, Minter portrayed Yvonne Miller in Stephen Hopkins' fantasy horror film A Nightmare on Elm Street 5: The Dream Child. She starred alongside Lisa Wilcox as Alice Johnson and Robert Englund as Freddy Krueger. The same year, she portrayed Loret in the film Cat Chaser. The following year, Minter was cast as LaDonna in Reginald Hudlin's comedy film House Party. In 1991, she portrayed a recovering drug addict in New Jack City, Cheryl in Popcorn, Mulready in Doc Hollywood, and Ruby Williams in Wes Craven's The People Under the Stairs. The same year, she had guest appearances on a variety of television series such as Father Dowling Mysteries, WIOU, and Sibs.

In 1992, Minter portrayed Sharonda in the television film Murder Without Motive: The Edmund Perry Story. The following year, she portrayed Joanna in the film Sunset Grill and Rhodesia in an episode of Martin. In 1994, she appeared in the television film Cosmic Slop. In 1996, she portrayed a hooker in The Rich Man's Wife, a crack mom in an episode of ER, and Rita in the television film A Face to Die For. The following year, she portrayed Chrissie Brooks in Dead Men Can't Dance.

In 2001, Minter starred in the television film Stranger Inside and had a guest appearance in the televisions series Providence. The following year, she portrayed Vielle Montoya in an episode of Strong Medicine. In 2003, she portrayed Angie in the film Tapped Out. In 2008, she portrayed Karen in an episode of Zoey 101. In 2010, Minter appeared as herself in the documentary Never Sleep Again: The Elm Street Legacy. In 2012, she appeared as herself in the documentary After the Violence.

== Personal life ==
Minter has been married to singer-songwriter Georgio Allentini since 1992. They have three sons.

== Filmography ==
=== Film ===
Year	Title	Role	Notes
1984	Be Somebody... or Be Somebody's Fool!	Herself	Video
1985	Mask	Lorrie	
1985	Badge of the Assassin	Rachel Torres	TV movie
1986	Charley Hannah	Toni	TV movie
1987	Summer School	Denise Green	
1987	The Lost Boys	Maria	
1987	The Principal	Treena Lester	
1988	Sharing Richard	-	TV movie
1988	Miracle Mile	Charlotta	
1989	A Nightmare on Elm Street 5: The Dream Child	Yvonne Miller	
1989	Cat Chaser	Loret	
1990	House Party	LaDonna	
1991	New Jack City	Recovering Addict	
1991	Popcorn	Cheryl	
1991	Out for Justice	Hooker	
1991	Doc Hollywood	Mulready	
1991	The People Under the Stairs	Ruby Williams	
1992	Murder Without Motive: The Edmund Perry Story	Sharonda	TV movie
1993	Sunset Grill	Joanna	
1996	A Face to Die For	Rita	TV movie
1996	The Rich Man's Wife	Cursing Hooker	
1997	Dead Men Can't Dance	Sergeant Chrissie Brooks	
2001	Stranger Inside	Group Therapy Women	TV movie
2002	Banged Out	-	Video
2003	Tapped Out	Angie	
2019	Getting the Kinks Out	Denise	

=== Television ===
Year	Title	Role	Notes
1983	Fame	Angel	Episode: "Break Dance"
1984	Buchanan High	Elena	Episode: "Editor and Chief"
1984	Insight	Carla	Episode: "The Pilot"
1985	T.J. Hooker	Kelly	Episode: "Street Bate"
1986	Walt Disney's Wonderful World of Color	Vicky	Episode: "The Deacon Street Deer"
1987	Hill Street Blues	Kathy	Episode: "It Ain't Over Till It's Over"
1988	A Different World	Charisse	Recurring Cast: Season 2
1991	Father Dowling Mysteries	Sheri	Episode: "The Joyful Noise Mystery"
1991	WIOU	Jasmine	Episode: "Three Women and a Baby"
1991	Sibs	Edna	Episode: "The Naked and the Damned"
1993	Martin	Rhodesia	Episode: "Control"
1994	Cosmic Slop	Female Drug Dealer	Episode: "The First Commandment"
1996	ER	Leah Russell	Episode: "Baby Shower"
2001	Providence	-	Episode: "Trial & Error"
2002	Strong Medicine	Vielle Montoya	Episode: "Precautions"
2008	Zoey 101	Karen	Episode: "Coffee Cart Ban"

=== Documentary ===
Year	Title
2009	Best Worst Movie
2010	Never Sleep Again: The Elm Street Legacy
2014	After the Violence
