= Rich Girl (film) =

1991 romantic drama film by Joel Bender

- Theatrical release poster
- Directed by: Joel Bender
- Written by: Robert Elliot
- Produced by: Herb Linsey (line producer); Michael B. London (producer); Richard Mann (associate producer)
- Starring: Jill Schoelen; Don Michael Paul; Ron Karabatsos; Sean Kanan; Willie Dixon; Paul Gleason
- Cinematography: Levie Isaacks
- Edited by: Richard Candib; Mark Helfrich
- Music by: Jay Chattaway
- Distributed by: Studio Three Film Corporation
- Release date: May 3, 1991
- Running time: 96 minutes
- Country: United States
- Language: English
- Box office: $561,000

Rich Girl is a 1991 American romantic drama film directed by Joel Bender and written from the screenplay of Robert Elliot. The film stars Jill Schoelen in the title role, along with Cherie Currie and Paul Gleason in the supporting cast. The film centers around a wealthy girl from Bel-Air, who is tired of living off her wealthy family's name and decides to prove her independence from her overbearing father and obnoxious ex-fiancé by making her way in life by becoming a waitress at a nightclub and ends up falling in love with one of the club's rock musicians.

== Plot ==
Courtney Wells is tired of being seen as just a rich man's daughter. She breaks up with her fiancé Jeffrey (her father's intern), quits college, and tells her father that she is going to prove that she can be independent.

Her job applications meet with rejection. A secretary at one job interview suggests that Courtney apply to Rocco's, a nightclub. The owner of Roccos discovers that Courtney is the daughter of Marvin Wells and hires her as a management trainee.

Rick, a musician playing at Rocco's, makes advances toward Courtney, and Rocco tells Rick to stay away from her. Courtney is attacked in the parking lot outside the nightclub by two men she had ejected. Rick fights them off.

After Rick and Courtney become involved, Rick's singing partner Michelle quits. Rick convinces Courtney to take Michelle's place. Rocco warns Courtney against being involved with Rick, implying that her father will ruin Rick's career if she sings with him. Rick learns about Courtney's rich father and is upset with her. His own father, a homeless man, dies of a drug overdose. After the funeral, Rick tells Courtney he does not want to see her anymore.

Jeffrey discovers where Courtney is working and shows up at Rocco's to harass her. He tries to force her to leave with him, but she refuses. When Marvin is unable to pressure Rick into staying away from Courtney, Jeffrey plants drugs on Rick's motorcycle, and Rick is arrested. Courtney pawns her bracelet to bail him out anonymously.

Rick's band performs at a showcase at Rocco's, and the other band members convince Courtney to perform with them. Marvin and Jeffrey both show up at the showcase. Rick and Jeffrey fight, and Courtney argues with her father. Rick and Courtney leave together on Rick's motorcycle.

== Release ==
Originally intended as a made-for-television film, Columbia Pictures RCA home video picked up the project to make it a direct-to-video release but when Studio Three Films and Film West picked up the project, it managed to receive a limited release through select theaters nationwide. The film was on a budget of $785,000 budget, but grossed $368,056 in its first week and a total $561,000 from its time in theaters. The film was rated R and in the following months RCA Home Video released the film on VHS.

== Reception ==
The film met mixed reviews with a great amount of negative reviews from movie critics, most famously from The Washington Post.

== Cast ==
- Jill Schoelen as Courtney Wells
- Don Michael Paul as Rick Asbury
- Sean Kanan as Jefferey Banks
- Paul Gleason as Marvin Wells
- Ron Karabatsos as Rocco
- Cherie Currie as Michelle
- Willie Dixon as Himself
- Melanie Tomlin as Diana
- Trudi Forristal as Tracy
- Ann Gillespie as Carol
- Bentley Mitchum as Scott
- Lex Lang as Dennis
- Eddy Griffith as Mr. Asbury
- Peter Cohl as Chopin
- Lance Carter as Drummer
- Gail Neely as Ethel
- Ingrid Berg as Angela Carpoli
- Celebrity Skin as Themselves
- Darling Cruel as Themselves
- Precious Metal as Themselves
- Linda Galloway as Businesswoman
- Isabel Cooley as Counselor
- Kirk Scott as Investment Banker
- Frederick Flynn as Landlord
- Alicia Lassiter as Blond Temptress
- Irving William Moseley Jr. as The Minister
- Daphne Cheung as Oriental Temptress
- Chuck Courtney as Police Officer #1
- Christopher Doyle as Police Officer #2
- Mark Riccardi as Bar Tough #1
- Lincoln Simonds as Bar Tough #2
- Larry Gelman as Pawnbroker
- Cynthia Geary as Sorority Girl #1
- Linda West as Sorority Girl #2
- Doyle McCurley as Prison Guard
- Hans Howes as Police Sergeant
- Kristine Seeley as Groupie
