= Rolf Knie =

Swiss painter, circus performer and actor (born 1949)

- Born: 16 August 1949 (age 77); Bern, Switzerland
- Occupations: Painter, circus performer, actor

Saxophone Playing Elephant (1996), created for the Montreux Jazz Festival and installed in Caux

Rolf Knie (born 16 August 1949) is a Swiss painter, circus performer and actor. A member of the sixth generation of the Knie circus dynasty, he performed with Circus Knie as a trick rider, animal trainer and clown before developing a career as a visual artist.

== Biography ==
Rolf Knie was born on 16 August 1949 in Bern. He is the son of Pierrette Dubois and Fredy Knie senior, director of the Swiss National Circus. Knie is a sixth-generation member of the Knie circus dynasty. He spent most of his childhood in Belp near Bern, living with host families while the rest of the Knie family toured Switzerland. After compulsory schooling, Knie began commercial studies in Zurich in 1966 but left before completing them.

From 1968, Knie performed with Circus Knie as a trick rider and animal trainer, and later became known for his work as a clown. He became friends with comedian Emil Steinberger during Steinberger's guest tour with Circus Knie in 1977. During the tour, Steinberger taught Knie perspective drawing while Knie was performing as a clown. Painter Hans Falk, who accompanied the circus on tour, also influenced Knie's development as a self-taught painter.

Knie began exhibiting independently in 1980, with a solo show in Zurich. His first edition of graphic works appeared that year. His first acting role came in the 1982 television film Hotel, for which he received the Chaplin Prize at the Festival de la Rose d'Or in Montreux. Knie left Circus Knie in 1983 and continued his career as an independent artist. He worked in stage and television acting until 1989. Painting subsequently became his main occupation, while film, stage and television were secondary pursuits. In 1989, Knie co-founded the Swiss foundation Menschen für Menschen with Karlheinz Böhm. He later became honorary president of the foundation.

Knie later developed an independent stage programme with Gaston Häni and Pipo Sosman that combined circus and theatre. It was performed more than 400 times. He subsequently returned to circus production, founding both the winter circus Salto Natale in 2002 and the erotic circus Ohlala in 2011, together with his son Gregory.

From 1988, Knie lived and worked in Arta, Mallorca, and St. Gallenkappel. Knie later said that the solitude and anonymity of his 35 years in Mallorca allowed him to focus on painting. By 2025, he had returned to Rapperswil, which he described as the centre of his life. Knie later received an honorary Prix Walo for his lifetime achievement. The award was a star-shaped sculpture that he had designed himself. In 2025, at the age of 75, Knie announced that he would retire from stage performance after the final performance of Charlys Tante on 10 May 2025.

== Work ==
Knie developed a figurative visual language during the 1980s, influenced by his engagement with Hans Falk's work. His paintings combined figurative linework with areas of colour and collage. He also used fragments of discarded circus tents as supports for works depicting circus subjects. Knie's work often drew on circus themes, including performers and animals.

From the early 1990s, Knie worked with objects and sculpture, including a monumental iron sculpture made with Spanish artist Miguel Sarasate. His work was shown internationally during the decade, including exhibitions in Paris, Monte Carlo and the United States. In 1995, Knie presented a retrospective of his work titled Halbzeit/Mi-temps in Lausanne and Baden.
