= The Best of Times (1981 film) =

- Written by: Bob Arnott; Carol Hatfield Sarasohn; Lane Sarasohn
- Directed by: Don Mischer
- Starring: Crispin Glover; Nicolas Cage; Jill Schoelen; Julie Piekarski
- Music by: Michael Warren
- Country of origin: United States
- Original language: English

Production
- Executive producer: George Schlatter
- Producer: Don Mischer
- Editor: Ken Morrisey
- Running time: 60 minutes

Original release
- Network: ABC
- Release: July 13, 1981

The Best of Times is a 1981 television pilot episode directed by Don Mischer that was never picked up as a series. It marked the acting debuts of Nicolas Cage and Crispin Glover.

== Plot ==
A variety show about life as a teenager as seen through the eyes of eight actual teenagers (Crispin, Julie, Jill, Nicolas, Kevin, Lisa, David and Janet) who perform skits, songs and dances that relate their views between childhood and adulthood.

== Cast ==
- Crispin Glover as Crispin
- Jill Schoelen as Jill
- Nicolas Cage as Nicolas (credited as Nicolas Coppola)
- Julie Piekarski as Julie
- Kevin Cortes as Kevin
- Lisa Hope Ross as Lisa
- David Rambo as David
- Janet Robin as Janet
- Jackie Mason as Mr. O'Reilly
- Betty Glover as Crispin's Mother
