= Elinor Donahue =

American actress (born 1937)

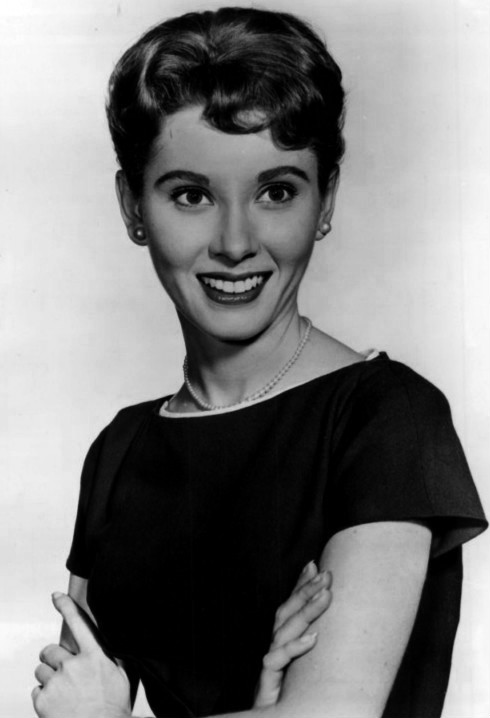
- Donahue in 1960
- Born: Mary Eleanor Donahue; April 19, 1937 (age 89); Tacoma, Washington, U.S.
- Other name: Mary Elinor Donahue
- Occupations: Actress; author
- Years active: 1942–2015
- Known for: *Father Knows Best; *Many Happy Returns; *The Andy Griffith Show; *Star Trek: The Original Series Metamorphosis; *The Odd Couple; *Pretty Woman; *Days of Our Lives
- Spouses: Richard Smith (m. 1955; div. 1961) Harry Ackerman (m. 1962; died 1991) Lou Genevrino (m. 1992)
- Children: 4

Elinor Donahue (born Mary Eleanor Donahue; April 19, 1937) is a retired American actress known for playing the role of Betty Anderson, the eldest child of Jim and Margaret Anderson, on the 1950s American sitcom Father Knows Best.

== Early life and career ==
Donahue was born in Tacoma, Washington, the daughter of Doris Genevieve (née Gelbaugh) and Thomas William Donahue on April 19, 1937.

Appearing in dancing-chorus film roles from the age of five, Donahue was at one point a ballet-school classmate of future Fred Astaire partner Barrie Chase. She was a child actress working in vaudeville and had several bit parts in movies as a teenager, including Love Is Better Than Ever (1952), starring Elizabeth Taylor and Tea for Two (1950) starring Doris Day. She played one of the daughters in Three Daring Daughters in 1948 and appeared as Mamie Van Doren's sister in Girls Town (1959).

== Father Knows Best ==
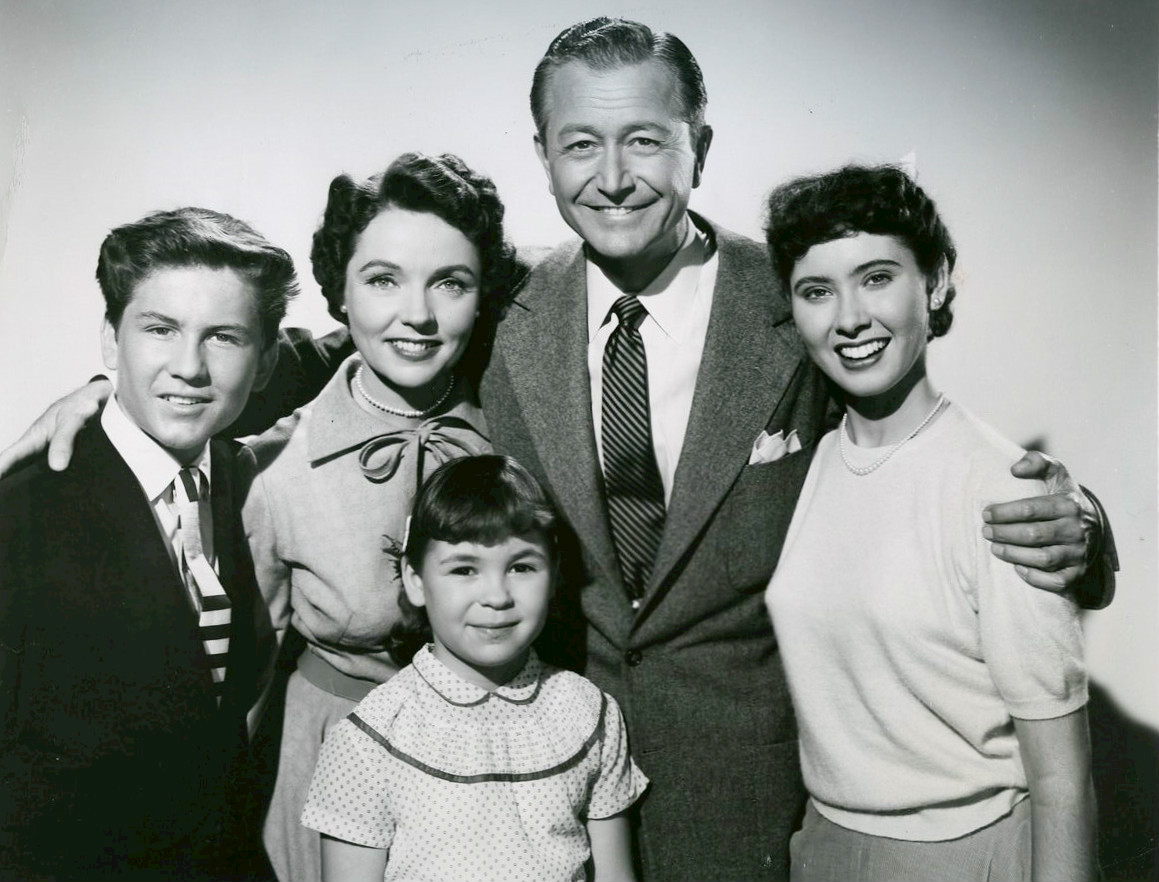
Cast photo of the Anderson family from the television program, Father Knows Best: (front) Lauren Chapin; (back, from left) Billy Gray, Jane Wyatt, Robert Young and Elinor Donahue in 1954.

Donahue achieved stardom for her role as the elder daughter, Betty, on the television family series Father Knows Best, which aired from 1954 to 1960. Her co-stars were Robert Young, Jane Wyatt, Billy Gray as her younger brother, James "Bud" Anderson Jr., and Lauren Chapin as her younger sister, Kathy.

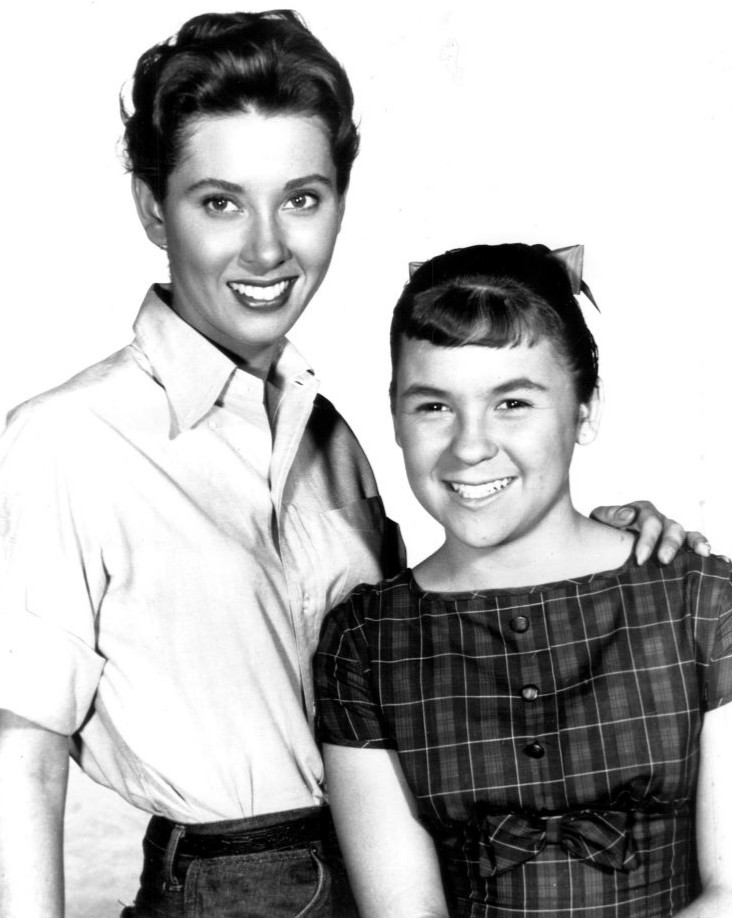
Elinor Donahue and Lauren Chapin on Father Knows Best in 1959

Donahue was a musical judge in ABC's Jukebox Jury (1953–54). While in the first season of Father Knows Best, she also appeared on The Ray Bolger Show, starring Ray Bolger as a song-and-dance man. Thereafter, she was cast with James Best, Ann Doran, and J. Carrol Naish in the 1956 episode "The White Carnation" of the religion anthology series, Crossroads. She guest-starred on an episode of U.S. Marshal. She also appeared as a new bride in The George Burns and Gracie Allen Show episode titled "The Newlyweds" that aired April 2, 1956. She acted in the feature film Girls Town (1959 film), which she later described as "an awful picture".

== 1960s to 1980s ==
Donahue played Georgiana Balanger, the niece of George and Martha Wilson, in the episode "Dennis and the Wedding" (1960) on Dennis the Menace. Donahue was also cast, in 1960, with Marion Ross in an episode ("Duet") of The Brothers Brannagan. She played Miriam Welby on ABC's The Odd Couple, Jane Mulligan on Mulligan's Stew, and evil Nurse Hunnicut on Days of Our Lives.

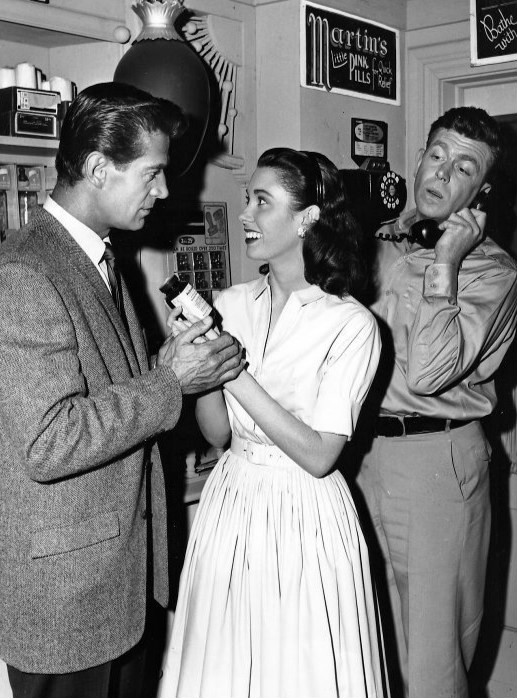
George Nader (left), Elinor Donahue and Andy Griffith on The Andy Griffith Show in 1961

She was part of the main cast for the first season of CBS's The Andy Griffith Show, as Andy's pharmacist love interest Ellie Walker. She was even mentioned in the opening credits before Don Knotts. After one season (1960–1961), Donahue asked for a release from her three-year contract. She and Ron Howard are the last surviving regularly credited cast members from that show.

In 1963, Donahue was cast in an episode of NBC's short-lived modern Western series, Redigo, with Richard Egan as the rancher Jim Redigo. Then she played in another Western series Have Gun Will Travel as Letty May in the episode "The Burning Tree".

In 1964, she appeared in the NBC TV series The Eleventh Hour, a medical drama dealing with psychiatry, starring Jack Ging and Ralph Bellamy, where she played the role of Melanie in the episode "The Secret in the Stone".

In 1966, she guest-starred on the TV series A Man Called Shenandoah, episode 8, "Town On Fire".

In 1967, she guest-appeared on Star Trek in the second-season episode "Metamorphosis" as commissioner Nancy Hedford.

Donahue portrayed the sister of Sister Bertrille (Sally Field) in three episodes of ABC's The Flying Nun (1968–70).

She portrayed Miriam Welby in 17 episodes of The Odd Couple (1972–75).

In 1977, she appeared in an episode of the ABC crime drama The Feather and Father Gang.

In 1978, Donahue starred in the NBC sitcom Please Stand By.

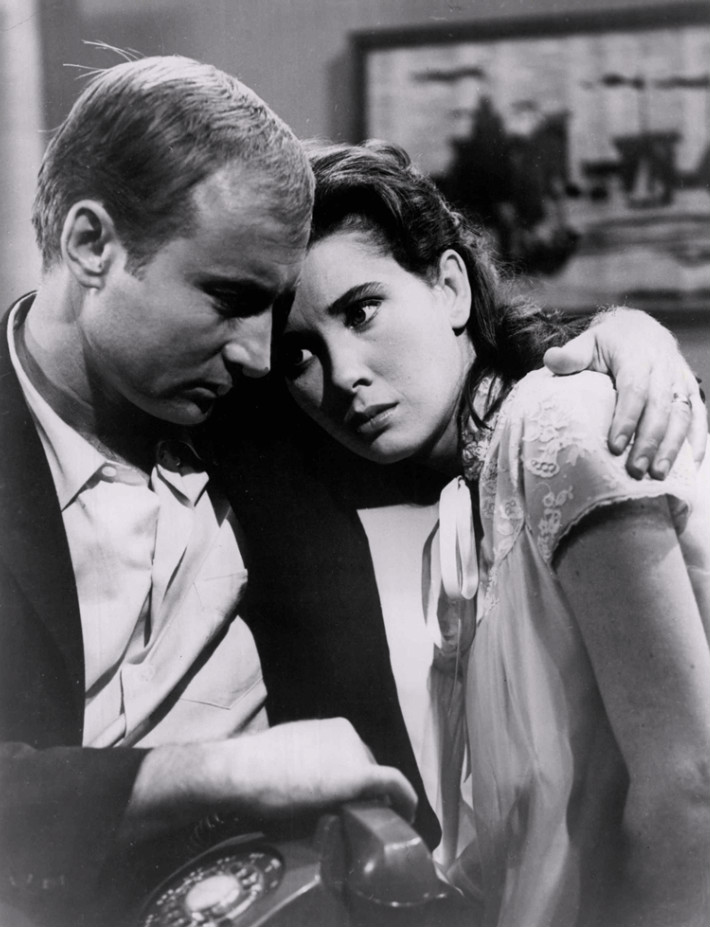
Nick Adams and Elinor Donahue on General Electric Theater in 1961

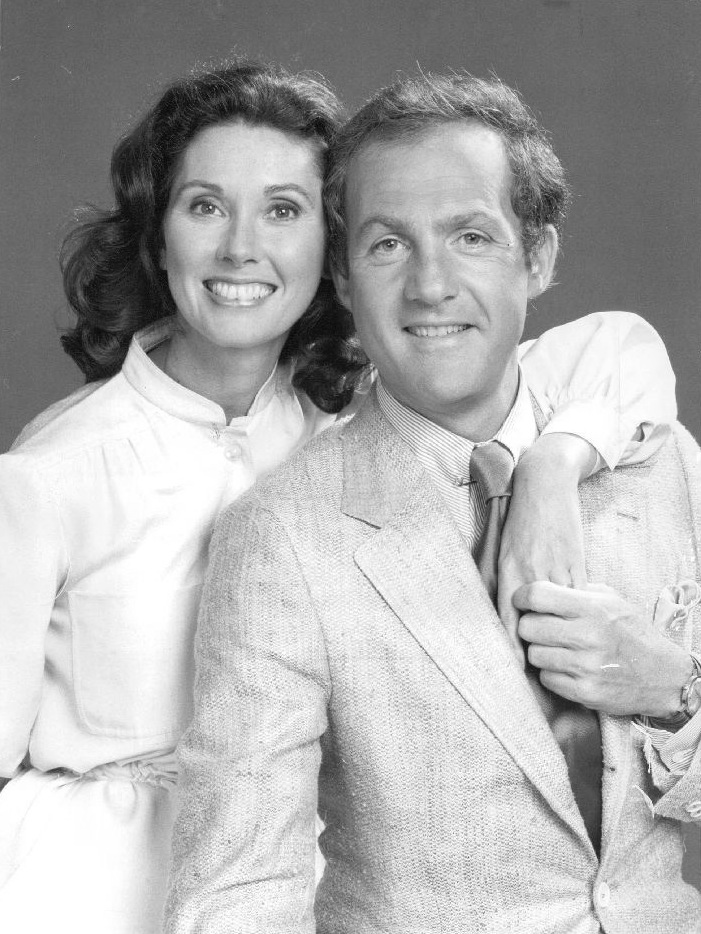
Publicity photo of Elinor Donahue and Lawrence Pressman promoting the Tuesday, October 25, 1977 premiere of the NBC television series Mulligan's Stew

In 1979, she appeared on Diff'rent Strokes as a fiancée to Mr. Drummond in season 1.

In 1981, Donahue appeared in an episode of One Day at a Time, as Alex's mother Felicia.

In 1984, she made an appearance as Mrs. Broderick, the mother of a teenage drug addict on the last season of Happy Days.

In 1987, she played the title character's mother in the short-lived Fox series The New Adventures of Beans Baxter.

In 1988, she appeared in a Newhart episode ("Courtin' Disaster").

In 1989 she appeared in an episode of The Golden Girls as the newest wife of Dorothy Zbornak's ex-husband, Stan.

== 1990s and later ==
In 1990, she played Bridget, a Beverly Hills clothing-store manager, in the film Pretty Woman. Donahue played Gladys, the mother of Chris Peterson (Chris Elliott), in all 35 episodes of the sitcom Get a Life (1990–92), and had a recurring role as Rebecca Quinn on the CBS drama series Dr. Quinn, Medicine Woman.

In 1991, she portrayed the "Orphanage woman" in Freddy's Dead: The Final Nightmare.

In 1992, she voiced the mother on the Fox Kids animated series Eek! the Cat. In 1994, she made an appearance as Aunt Lillian in "The One Where Nana Dies Twice", an episode of Friends. She played the part of Lorraine, Luther Van Dam's girlfriend, in season five of Coach in the early 1990s.

In 1998, Donahue published a memoir titled In the Kitchen with Elinor Donahue, in which she relived some of her memories of Hollywood along with providing more than 150 of her recipes.

In September 2010, Donahue made an appearance on The Young and the Restless as Judge Anderson, one of Nikki Newman's old friends and also as the woman minister who will officiate at the wedding of Billy Abbott and Nikki's daughter, Victoria Newman. The wedding took place in front of the Abbotts' new home, which just happened to be a replica of the Anderson house from Father Knows Best.

In 2015, Donahue played the role of Mrs. Chumley in Judson Theatre Company's production of the Pulitzer Prize play Harvey by Mary Chase. Donahue called the role her "swan song".

== Personal life ==
Donahue has been married three times. Her first husband was sound producer Richard Smith whom she married in 1955. She had one son with him. They divorced in 1961. Her second marriage, to producer Harry Ackerman, who was 25 years her senior, was in 1962 at the Court of Liberty. He was the adoptive father of her son from her first marriage, and Donahue and he had three sons together. Ackerman died in 1991. As a memorial and resource for the history of American television, Donahue donated Ackerman's personal papers to the Rauner Library at Dartmouth College, his alma mater. In 1992, she married actor Lou Genevrino.

== Filmography ==
=== Film ===
Year	Title	Role
1943	Mister Big	Muggsy
1943	Honeymoon Lodge	Janie Thomas
1944	Bowery to Broadway	Young Bessie Jo
1944	And Now Tomorrow	Janice - age 4
1946	Winter Wonderland	Betty Wheeler
1947	The Unfinished Dance	Josie
1948	Three Daring Daughters	Alix Morgan
1948	Tenth Avenue Angel	Cynthia
1948	The Arkansas Swing	Toni MacGregor
1949	An Old-Fashioned Girl	Maud Shaw
1950	The Happy Years	Connie Brown
1950	Tea for Two	Lynne Smith
1950	My Blue Heaven	Mary
1951	Her First Romance	Lucille Stewart
1952	Love Is Better Than Ever	Pattie Marie Levoy
1959	Girls Town	Mary Lee Morgan
1983	Going Berserk	Margaret Anderson
1990	Pretty Woman	Bridget
2004	The Princess Diaries 2: Royal Engagement	Lady Palimore

=== Television ===
Year	Title	Role	Notes
1954–60	Father Knows Best	Betty Anderson	Main role
1955	Lux Video Theatre	Helen Richards	Episode: "The Life of Emile Zola"
1955	Letter to Loretta	Debbie Waring / Janey	2 episodes
1956	The George Burns and Gracie Allen Show	Emily Vanderlip Foster	Episode: "The Newlyweds"
1956	Ford Theatre	Katherine Casey	Episode: "Sheila"
1958	U.S. Marshal	Martha Watson	Episode: "Shoot to Kill"
1960	Goodyear Theatre	Connie Peters	Episode: "Marked Down for Connie"
1960	Dennis the Menace	Georgiana Balanger	Episode: "Dennis and the Wedding"
1960	The Brothers Brannagan	Kate Warren	Episode: "Duet"
1960–61	The Andy Griffith Show	Elinor "Ellie" Walker	Main cast (season 1)
1961	General Electric Theater	Carol Madsen	Episode: "A Voice on the Phone"
1961	The United States Steel Hour	Fran Crowell	Episode: "Delayed Honeymoon"
1963	77 Sunset Strip	Laura Holt	Episode: "Scream Softly, Dear"
1963	Have Gun – Will Travel	Letty Mae Stinchcomb	Episode: "The Burning Tree"
1963	Dr. Kildare	Sharon Calloway	Episode: "Ship's Doctor"
1963	Redigo	Joanie-Mae Kilpatrick	Episode: "Hostage Hero Riding"
1963	The Virginian	Carole Cole	Episode: "Siege"
1964	The Eleventh Hour	Melanie	Episode: "The Secret in the Stone"
1964–65	Many Happy Returns	Joan Randall	Main role
1965	A Man Called Shenandoah	Julie Wade	Episode: "Town on Fire"
1967	Occasional Wife	Linda Sue	Episode: "Oil, Be Seeing You"
1967	Star Trek: The Original Series	Nancy Hedford	Episode: "Metamorphosis"
1968–70	The Flying Nun	Dr. Jennifer Ethrington	3 episodes
1969	In Name Only	Esther Garrity	ABC Movie of the Week
1972	Gidget Gets Married	Medley Blaine	ABC Movie of the Week
1972–75	The Odd Couple	Miriam Welby	Recurring role
1974	If I Love You, Am I Trapped Forever?	Alice Bennett	TV film
1974	Police Woman	Ellie Tarlow	Episode: "Warning: All Wives"
1974	The Rookies	Amanda	Episode: "Blue Christmas"
1975	Petrocelli	Joan Hiller	Episode: "Vengeance in White"
1976	S.W.A.T.	Marjorie Kemp	Episode: "Lessons in Fear"
1977	The Feather and Father Gang	Julie	Episode: "The People's Choice"
1977	The Father Knows Best Reunion	Betty Anderson	TV film
1977	Insight	Margaret Drill	Episode: "Christmas 2025"
1977	Mulligan's Stew	Jane Mulligan	Main role
1977	Father Knows Best: Home for Christmas	Betty Anderson	TV film
1977	Police Story	Camille Tackleberry	Episode: "Ice Time"
1978	Police Story	Joan Anderson	Episode: "No Margin for Error"
1978	Doctors' Private Lives	Mona Wise	TV film
1978	Please Stand By	Carol Lambert	Sitcom TV series - one year, aired in syndication
1979	Diff'rent Strokes	Diane Sloane	Episode: "The Woman"
1980	Condominium	Audrey Ames	TV film
1980	Barnaby Jones	Judy Corbett	Episode: "The Silent Accuser"
1981	Mork & Mindy	Dr. Joni Lincoln	Episode: "Mindy and Mork"
1981	The Grady Nutt Show	Ellie Williams	TV film
1981	One Day at a Time	Felicia	Episode: "Alex Moves In"
1981	Fantasy Island	Madge Nolan / Blanche Barrens	2 episodes
1982	The Dukes of Hazzard	Marjorie Dane	Episode: "The Sound of Music - Hazzard Style"
1983	High School U.S.A.	Mrs. Franklin	TV film
1983	Hotel	Louise	Episode: "Deceptions"
1984	No Earthly Reason	Mrs. Morrison	TV film
1984	Happy Days	Mrs. Broderick	Episode: "School Dazed"
1984–85	Days of Our Lives	Kate Honeycutt	Guest role
1986	Riptide	Elaine Warwick	Episode: "Echoes"
1987	The Love Boat	Betty Anderson	Episode: "Who Killed Maxwell Thorn?"
1987	The New Adventures of Beans Baxter	Susan Baxter	Regular role
1988	CBS Schoolbreak Special	Laura Donovan	Episode: "Never Say Goodbye"
1988	Newhart	Irma	Episode: "Courtin' Disaster"
1989	The Golden Girls	Katherine	Episode: "Stan Takes a Wife"
1989	Generations	Sylvia Furth	TV series
1989	Santa Barbara	Dr. Anderson	2 episodes
1990	Murder, She Wrote	Connie Lewis	Episode: "The Szechuan Dragon"
1990–92	Get a Life	Gladys Peterson	Main role
1992	Herman's Head	Mrs. Fitzer	Episode: "A Charlie Brown Fitzer"
1992–93	Eek! The Cat	Mom	Voice
1993	The Legend of Prince Valiant	Queen Eleanora	Voice, episode: "The Jubilee"
1993	Coach	Lorraine	2 episodes
1993	Biker Mice from Mars	Munsterella	Voice, episode: "A Scent, a Memory, a Far Distant Cheese"
1993–97	Dr. Quinn, Medicine Woman	Rebecca Quinn	Recurring role (seasons 2–6)
1994	Friends	Aunt Lillian	Episode: "The One Where Nana Dies Twice"
1995	The Invaders	Norma Winters	2 episodes
1996	Ellen	Delores Warwell	Episode: "The Tape"
1999	Shake, Rattle and Roll: An American Love Story	Mrs. Lebowitz	TV film
2001	Dr. Quinn, Medicine Woman: The Heart Within	Rebecca Quinn Dickinson	TV film
2005	Cold Case	Esther 'Legs' Davis	Episode: "Colors"
2010–11	The Young and the Restless	Judge Marie Anderson	Guest role (4 episodes)

=== Literature ===
Year	Title	Publisher	Category	Notes
1998	In the Kitchen With Elinor Donahue: Favorite Memories and Recipes from a Life in Hollywood ISBN 188895292X ISBN 9781888952926	Cumberland House	Memoir / Nonfiction	Paperback

== Awards and nominations ==
Year	Award	Category	Nominated work	Result
1959	11th Primetime Emmy Awards	Primetime Emmy Award for Outstanding Supporting Actress in a Comedy Series	Father Knows Best	Nominated
2004	TV Land Award	Legend Award	The Andy Griffith Show	Won
