= Army of One (2016 film) =

- Digital release poster
- Directed by: Larry Charles
- Written by: Rajiv Joseph; Scott Rothman
- Produced by: Emile Gladstone; Jeremy Steckler; James D. Stern
- Starring: Nicolas Cage; Wendi McLendon-Covey; Rainn Wilson; Russell Brand; Denis O'Hare; Paul Scheer; Will Sasso
- Cinematography: Anthony Hardwick
- Edited by: Christian Kinnard
- Music by: David Newman
- Production companies: Conde Nast Entertainment; Endgame Entertainment; Kasbah-Film Tanger
- Distributed by: TWC-Dimension (North America); FilmNation Entertainment (International)
- Release dates: October 28, 2016 (LIFF); November 4, 2016 (United States)
- Running time: 93 minutes
- Country: United States
- Language: English
- Box office: $372,194

Army of One is a 2016 American comedy film directed by Larry Charles and written by Rajiv Joseph and Scott Rothman. The film stars Nicolas Cage, Wendi McLendon-Covey, Rainn Wilson, Russell Brand, Denis O'Hare, Paul Scheer, and Will Sasso.

The film was released through video on demand and select theaters on November 4, 2016, before being released on DVD and Blu-ray on November 15, 2016, by Dimension Films.

In a 2020 interview, Cage revealed that the released version of the film was recut by Bob Weinstein without Charles' permission and that the latter's original version remains unreleased. In 2024, Charles released his original cut of the film onto his YouTube channel, which runs over an hour longer.

== Premise ==
The film follows Gary Faulkner, an ex-construction contractor and unemployed handy man who believes that God has sent him to capture Osama bin Laden in Pakistan. The story is based on the real-life Faulkner, who traveled to Pakistan looking for bin Laden.

== Cast ==
- Nicolas Cage as Gary Brooks Faulkner
- Wendi McLendon-Covey as Marci Mitchell
- Rainn Wilson as Agent Simons
- Russell Brand as God
- Denis O'Hare as Agent Doss
- Paul Scheer as Pickles
- Adrian Martinez as Actor
- Matthew Modine as Dr. Rose
- Will Sasso as Roy
- Amer Chadha-Patel as Osama bin Laden
- Chenoa Morison as Lizzie

== Production ==
On January 21, 2015, it was announced Larry Charles would direct the film, with Nicolas Cage starring as Gary Faulkner, a handyman from Colorado who receives a vision telling him to go to Pakistan to capture Osama bin Laden. On February 19, 2015, Wendi McLendon-Covey joined the cast. On April 16, 2015, Russell Brand, Denis O’Hare, Ken Marino, Paul Scheer and Rainn Wilson joined the cast of the film. Principal photography began on March 30, 2015, and ended on May 22, 2015.

== Release ==
The film was released on November 4, 2016, through video on demand and select theaters before being released through DVD and Blu-ray on November 15, 2016.

== Reception ==
The film received negative reviews. It currently holds a 25% rating on Rotten Tomatoes based on 12 reviews, with an average rating of 4.3/10.
