= Gary Brooks Faulkner =

American construction worker who attempted to capture Osama Bin Laden

- Born: Gary Brooks Faulkner; 1958 (age 67–68); Los Angeles, California, U.S.
- Occupations: General Contractor; Carpenter; Landlord
- Known for: Arrested by Pakistani authorities in 2010 on his hunt for Osama bin Laden
- Children: 1

Gary Brooks Faulkner (born 1958) is an American former construction worker and landlord who was arrested in 2010 in Pakistan while attempting to cross into Afghanistan carrying a sword, pistol, night vision goggles, a map, and a Bible in an attempt to capture Osama bin Laden, the founder and leader of Al-Qaeda, and hand him over to Pakistani authorities. Faulkner, believing that he was on a mission from God, spent ten days in the custody of Peshawar police. Faulkner claims to have made several trips to Pakistan, and made various other impractical attempts to get there, having made it as far as airport customs in his penultimate voyage. The 2016 film Army of One starring Nicolas Cage is based on him.

== Early life ==
Faulkner was born in 1958 in Los Angeles, California. When he was ten years old, he and his family moved to Colorado where Faulkner lived in Denver and Greeley where he currently resides.

In 1981 and 1986, Faulkner served prison sentences on burglary and larceny convictions. In 1996, Faulkner was sentenced to one year in Denver County Jail for a domestic-violence assault conviction. In 2006, he was arrested on a misdemeanor for failing to appear on a warrant from Larimer County, Colorado for not having car insurance.

Faulkner maintained a living working in construction as a general contractor and carpenter.

== Hunt for Osama bin Laden ==
=== Inspiration and early attempts ===
Faulkner considers himself to have tried the voyage eleven times in total. Faulkner, who had no military experience or training, was determined to find Osama Bin Laden on his own. His obsession with capturing Bin Laden stemmed from the September 11 attacks. According to his brother Scott, after the attacks "it became his passion, his mission, to track down Osama and kill him or bring him back alive". Scott also said that Gary was trained in martial arts, particularly in the Korean martial art of hapkido, and that the sword and dagger were his "weapons of choice." According to Chris Heath of GQ, who interviewed Faulkner, it was Faulkner's belief that Al-Qaeda was going to detonate a nuclear device in Mecca unless Bin Laden was captured by a specific date. He also believed that upon the successful completion of his mission, he would become the king of a Central American country.

Faulkner said that he had the idea to hunt Osama in 2004, after reading an article about Bin Laden hiding in the mountains of Pakistan. A coworker of Faulkner's commented that Faulkner had a dream which involved him getting to Pakistan "without his feet touching the ground." Faulkner's first attempt to travel was by boat and he bought a 21-foot yacht called the Pia Colada. However, the boat was considered illegal for use as there were no life jackets, flares, and other necessary safety equipment. He traveled from San Diego hoping to cross the Pacific Ocean, but a hurricane blew his boat south to the Baja California Peninsula in Mexico. His next attempt, the following year, once again involved another boat. After dislocating his shoulder, he sold that boat and used the money to buy a plane ticket to Pakistan and arrived a week later. He traveled from Islamabad to Lahore, and then to Sialkot where he stayed on a military base before being directed to a town in a northern tribal area of Gilgit. From there he began to explore the remote mountains of the country.

Faulkner's fourth, fifth, ninth, and tenth attempts to find Bin Laden revolved around searching the Chitral region. On his first trip to the area, he claims to have come in contact with a senior Al-Qaeda official when he shared a car with a man who had an "unwelcoming" demeanor. Faulkner said that he wandered for four days in disguise among "Al-Qaeda workers" near a cave. He described the people in the area as "running around with axes and all kinds of stuff, working on cutting down trees and making the new cave." On his second trip, he said that he slept on a bed of pine needles in the mountains where he could watch the cave waiting to see if Bin Laden would show up.

He was unable to reach Pakistan on his sixth, seventh, and eighth attempts to travel there. His sixth attempt involved flying to Pakistan through hang gliding, though he had never used a hang glider before. He decided that the best place to practice hang gliding was in Israel. He described it as "I've got to test it somewhere, so in my mind: Well, if I go to Israel—the Dead Sea! Hit the water, you float!" He purchased a hang glider which he then cut up into six-foot pieces that would fit into a ski bag. He used copper tubes from a cabin he was renovating to craft brackets for reassembling the glider. In September 2006, while in Israel, he put the glider back together and prepared to launch himself off a cliff by the Dead Sea. He broke his ribs and dislocated his shoulder on the attempt. He then asked a local hostel to store his glider until he could return. He returned in August and attempted to take off closer to the water. Missing the water, Faulkner hit the rocks and scraped his shins. He undid his harness and left the remains of his glider on the rocks.

In January 2008, Faulkner made his eighth attempt to search for Bin Laden in Pakistan and set out for Los Angeles where he could apply for a visa to enter Pakistan. He decided to go to Los Angeles by road, accompanied by two friends. They left on a Friday after receiving their paychecks. On the way, they decided to stop in Las Vegas. Faulkner recalls his trip to Vegas stating, "I still don't remember all of Vegas. And I forgot the whole reason why I was going out that way anyway." He did not reach Los Angeles and never applied for a visa there. Nonetheless, Faulkner took a flight to Pakistan where he was unable to enter the country due to his lack of a visa and returned home on the next flight.

=== Final attempt and arrest ===
Faulkner's eleventh and final trip to find Bin Laden took place in June 2010. The items he carried on the trip included a samurai sword, a gun, night vision goggles, a Bible, Smith & Wesson handcuffs, a copy of Andrew Wommack's A Better Way to Pray, and a Liberty Dollar. The pistol was a .30-caliber Chinese pistol that carried eight rounds with no safety. The gun was purchased on his previous visit in a back alley in Chitral for about one hundred dollars. Faulkner had purchased the sword after seeing it on The Knife Show. Upon arriving, he checked into a room at the Ishpata Inn in Bumburet Valley. Faulkner claims that Al-Qaeda members noticed and photographed him and that they were looking for him along with military police.

Faulkner was arrested by Pakistani authorities on June 13, 2010, in Bumburet Valley near the border with Afghanistan's Nuristan Province because he believed Bin Laden was in that part of the country. Faulkner said that his arrest by the police officers was planned out and that they fed him pizza from Pizza Hut while in their custody. After his arrest, he was questioned by police in Peshawar. When authorities were approaching Faulkner, he shouted, "Don’t come closer to me or I'll open fire." According to the newspaper Dawn, Faulkner acknowledged to police he wanted to "decapitate Osama bin Laden." Mumtaz Ahmad Khan, a senior official in the Peshawar police, told the Associated Press, "We initially laughed when he told us he wanted to kill Osama bin Laden."

Dawn had reported that Faulkner was carrying "a small amount of hashish" according to an unnamed security official. Faulkner also told police that he intended to cross across the border into Afghanistan and to join the U.S. forces fighting the Taliban. Scott told reporters upon his brother's arrest that Gary had intended to use the reward money for Bin Laden to help people in Central America. While in custody, American officials visited him with a doctor, finding that he needed dialysis but was otherwise in "good spirits."

Ten days later on June 23, 2010, he was released without any charges. He landed at Los Angeles International Airport before arriving at Denver International Airport heading back home to Greeley where he received applause from supporters and family members. Faulkner spoke to KTLA after arriving at the airport saying, "This is not about me. What this is about is the American people and the world. We can't let people like this scare us. We don't get scared by people like this, we scare them and that's what this is about. We're going to take care of business." Faulkner told his brother that he was treated well by the authorities and that he did not have any media access making him completely unaware of the media attention.

Faulkner's arrest did not cause a crisis in the relations between the United States and Pakistan since Faulkner was not charged with violating any crime according to Pakistani law. But nonetheless, some Pakistanis felt that Faulkner may have been working for the CIA or the mercenary group Blackwater. The American embassy was not in contact with Faulkner but the State Department had been working to release him and asked his family to send $683 to pay for his changed airline ticket.

=== Post-release ===
On June 28, 2010, Faulkner appeared on the Late Show with David Letterman describing his plan to capture Bin Laden, his attempts, and his travels in Pakistan. During the interview, he said he had no clue on how to avoid trouble after arriving in Pakistan, and that he knew nothing about the country or its inhabitants, being solely focused on Bin Laden. He found the people "warm and welcoming", and his interactions with locals encouraged him to continue his mission. Despite earlier reports claiming that Faulkner wanted to kill Osama bin Laden, he wanted to capture Bin Laden like Saddam Hussein and had no plans to hand him over to the American government as he did not want to "drag this thing any further". He claimed that he did not initially get into any trouble with the Pakistani government but with Al-Qaeda.

Nearly a year after Faulkner's arrest, Bin Laden was confirmed to be in Abbottabad, just two hours from Pakistan's capital city of Islamabad, in a compound that was raided by SEAL Team Six resulting in his death on May 2, 2011.

After news of Bin Laden's death, Faulkner wanted what he claimed to be his share of the $25 million bounty that was put on Bin Laden after 9/11 under the Rewards for Justice Program. Faulkner stated, "I had a major hand and play in this wonderful thing, getting him out of the mountains and down to the valleys... Someone had to get him out of there. That's where I came in." Of the event itself, he said that "I'm proud of our boys, I'm very proud of our government ... They were handed this opportunity on a platter from myself." Faulkner was not paid the bounty nor was anyone else. Although, Faulkner said in his 2010 interview with Letterman that he was not interested in the bounty on Bin Laden.

== Personal life ==
Faulkner is divorced and has one son from the marriage. Faulkner and his brother Scott run an apartment complex together in Greeley.

Faulkner suffers from chronic kidney disease and high blood pressure. According to his sister, Deanna, he has only nine percent kidney function and requires dialysis three times a week. At the time of Faulkner's arrest, media reports alleged that Bin Laden also had the same condition, but these were proven false.

On September 1, 2011, Weld County authorities issued an affidavit for Faulkner for possessing a weapon as a previous offender. The incident occurred as Faulkner was informing a tenant that she was going to be evicted. The woman and three of her friends broke into Faulkner's apartment to change his mind. Faulkner fired a warning shot that sent the four running away. The police came to his apartment and took the gun from him. Faulkner went to the police station on August 31, 2011, to retrieve his gun and a background check on Faulkner resulted in a felony summons. The affidavit states that when Faulkner learned he was going to be charged, he claimed that he was above the law. Faulkner allegedly told police officers that he would defend himself if he felt he had to, and threatened to shoot the officers if necessary. He was arrested on September 1, 2011, and was detained at the Weld County North Jail Complex in Greeley. Faulkner was awaiting trial for March 5, 2012, and was unable to post bond set at ten thousand dollars as he represented himself during the hearing.

== In popular culture ==
In 2011, a documentary film titled Binny Boy - One Man's Hunt for the World's Greatest Fugitive documents Faulkner's quest to capture Bin Laden was released.

Faulkner's escapades and his life story was adapted into the 2016 feature film Army of One where Faulkner was portrayed by Nicolas Cage.
