= Chris Kelly (writer) =

American screenwriter and director

- Born: September 7, 1983 (age 42); Sacramento, California, U.S.
- Education: University of California Irvine
- Occupations: Screenwriter; director
- Years active: 2005–present
- Awards: Peabody Award (2009)

Christopher Kelly (born September 7, 1983) is an American screenwriter and director known for his work on Saturday Night Live (SNL), and writing and directing the autobiographical film Other People that premiered at the 2016 Sundance Film Festival. He received five Emmy Award nominations for his work on SNL.

== Career ==
=== Early career ===
Kelly grew up in Sacramento, California, the son of Joanne née Kellogg (1960–2009) Kelly. He has a sister, Janelle, and a half sister, Katie, from his mother's remarriage. He attended and graduated from Sheldon High School. He attended college at UC Irvine. He was a staff writer and director at Funny or Die and Onion News Network, the latter of which won the 2009 Peabody Award. He was also Head Writer for Matt Besser's Comedy Central special This Show Will Get You High in 2010. Kelly also performed at NYC's Upright Citizens Brigade Theatre with his storytelling show Chris Kelly: America's Princess Diana, and before that, wrote, directed and starred in the play Oh My God, I Heard You're Dying! He was on various Maude Teams as both a writer and actor, including Stone Cold Fox, 27 Kidneys, and Thunder Gulch, and was a frequent monologist at ASSSSCAT in both NYC and LA.

=== Saturday Night Live ===
Kelly joined Saturday Night Live as a staff writer in 2011 for the 37th season. He was promoted to a supervising writer on the 40th season. Along with his SNL writing partner, Sarah Schneider, Kelly has created many sketches including: "(Do It On My) Twin Bed," "Back Home Ballers," "The Beygency" (about Beyoncé), and "First Got Horny 2 U." He and Schneider primarily wrote for Aidy Bryant and Kate McKinnon, including "Dyke and Fats." Kelly has been nominated for five Primetime Emmy Awards for his work on SNL.

In August 2016, it was announced that Kelly and Schneider would be co-head writers for SNL's 42nd season. Kelly was the first openly gay head writer of SNL. Both Kelly and Schneider left SNL after the completion of the 42nd season.

=== Broad City ===
Kelly was also a writer and consulting producer on Comedy Central's Broad City, which earned him a nomination for the Writers Guild of America Award for Television: Comedy Series. He was a self-described fan of the Broad City web series and joined the show as a writer and consulting producer when it was picked up as a series on Comedy Central.

=== The Other Two ===
Along with SNL co-headwriter Schneider, Kelly is the creator and executive producer (along with Lorne Michaels) of The Other Two, which premiered on January 24, 2019, on Comedy Central. The show stars Drew Tarver, Heléne Yorke, Molly Shannon, Ken Marino, and Case Walker. Season 3 received an Emmy nomination for Outstanding Writing for a Comedy Series.

=== Film ===
Kelly wrote and directed his first feature film, Other People, that premiered at the 2016 Sundance Film Festival in the opening slot. The film is about a struggling comedy writer (played by Jesse Plemons), who has just broken up with his boyfriend and moves from New York City to Sacramento to help his sick mother (played by Molly Shannon). He has to live with his conservative father and younger sisters for the first time in many years and feels like a stranger in his childhood home. As his mother's health deteriorates, David tries to extract meaning from the awful experience and convince everyone that he's doing okay. The film is loosely based on his own life drawing from his experience of losing his mother to cancer in 2009. He was labeled one of the "13 Hot Directors to Watch" at Sundance in 2016.

== Personal life ==
In 2015, Kelly lived in Los Angeles with his boyfriend and their dog Jill.

== Awards and nominations ==
Kelly received the following awards and nominations:

=== Peabody Award ===
- 2009 Peabody Award - Onion News Network (won)

=== Primetime Emmy Award ===
- 2012 Primetime Emmy Award for Outstanding Writing for a Variety Series - Saturday Night Live (nominated)
- 2013 Primetime Emmy Award for Outstanding Writing for a Variety Series - Saturday Night Live (nominated)
- 2014 Primetime Emmy Award for Outstanding Writing for a Variety Series - Saturday Night Live (nominated)
- 2015 Primetime Emmy Award for Outstanding Writing for a Variety Series - Saturday Night Live (nominated)
- 2015 Primetime Emmy Award for Outstanding Variety, Music, or Comedy Special - Saturday Night Live 40th Anniversary Special (nominated)

=== Writers Guild of America Award ===
- 2012 Writers Guild of America Award for Television: Comedy/Variety (Including Talk) - Series - Saturday Night Live (nominated)
- 2013 Writers Guild of America Award for Television: Comedy/Variety (Including Talk) - Series - Saturday Night Live (nominated)
- 2014 Writers Guild of America Award for Television: Comedy/Variety (Including Talk) - Series - Saturday Night Live (nominated)
- 2015 Writers Guild of America Award for Television: Comedy/Variety (Including Talk) - Series - Saturday Night Live (nominated)
- 2015 Writers Guild of America Award for Television: Comedy Series - Broad City (nominated)
