= Screenager =

Screenager may refer to:

- "Screenager" (song), by Muse from Origin of Symmetry
- Screenagers, a documentary by Delaney Ruston

== See also ==
- Screamager, a song by Therapy? from the Shortsharpshock EP
