= Andreen =

Andreen is a surname. Notable people with the surname include:

- Andrea Andreen (1888–1972), Swedish physician, pacifist, and feminist
- Omar Andréen (1922–2010), Norwegian painter, graphic artist, and illustrator
- Scilla Andreen (born 1961), American filmmaker
