= Sarah Schneider =

American writer, actress, and comedian

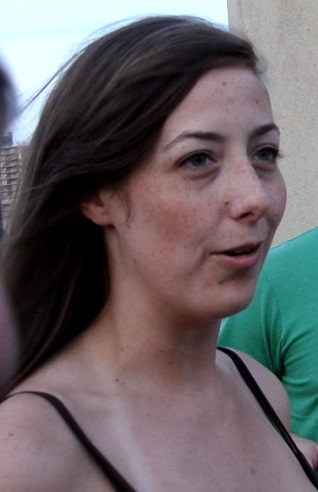
- Sarah Schneider in 2007
- Born: September 10, 1983 (age 43); Summit, New Jersey, U.S.
- Education: Wake Forest University
- Occupations: Comedy writer, actress
- Spouse: Mike Karnell (m. 2018)
- Writing career
- Period: 2005–present
- Genre: Comedy
- Notable works: CollegeHumor; Saturday Night Live

Sarah Schneider (born September 10, 1983) is an American writer, actress, and comedian. She got her start in entertainment as a writer and actress for the comedy website CollegeHumor.

She later became a writer for the television sketch comedy series Saturday Night Live, where she worked from 2011 to 2017, including a season as co-head writer alongside writing partner Chris Kelly. She has received eight Primetime Emmy Awards nominations for her work on SNL.

== Early life ==
Raised in Hunterdon County, New Jersey, Schneider graduated from North Hunterdon High School in 2001.

== Career ==
=== CollegeHumor ===
Schneider attended Wake Forest University—as did CollegeHumor co-founder Ricky Van Veen, although they did not know one another—where she was a member of the University's Lilting Banshees student comedy troupe. A mutual friend recommended Schneider to Van Veen, who hired her as a freelance writer in May 2005 to work on the book The CollegeHumor Guide To College. From there she became a full-time writer and the first female permanent employee. As part of the CollegeHumor staff she starred as a fictionalized version of herself in the short-lived television series The CollegeHumor Show (2009) and web series including Hardly Working and Full Benefits; starred as other characters in other original videos; and wrote episodes, videos and articles.

=== Saturday Night Live ===
In 2011, Schneider became a writer for Saturday Night Live. She had been a guest writer on the last five episodes of season 36 (2010–2011) and became a full-time writer from season 37 (2011–2012).

In 2013, her musical sketch "(Do It On My) Twin Bed" was her first big SNL hit with fellow writer Chris Kelly. She and Kelly also wrote "Hometown Tourism Ad" since joining SNL in 2011, and "Christmas Spectacular."

Vulture named Schneider and Kelly onto their list in 2014 of the 50 comedians to watch.

In November 2015, she had worked with Kelly to write "Back Home Ballers," and "First Got Horny 2 U." At that time, they also headed the political debate sketches during election season, like the Democratic debate sketch in October 2015. Schneider and Kelly also co-penned sketches like "The Beygency" and "Bar Talk." In August 2016, SNL promoted Schneider and Kelly to co-head writers of the 42nd season of the show. Schneider became the show's first female head writer since 2008. Schneider and Kelly left SNL at the end of season 42. In March 2017, Comedy Central commissioned Schneider and Kelly to write a pilot episode about two siblings struggling with the sudden fame of their younger brother. By then, Schneider had also been a writer on Master of None on Netflix.

=== The Other Two ===
Together with fellow SNL head writer Chris Kelly, Sarah Schneider has created The Other Two, an American comedy television series which premiered on Comedy Central on January 24, 2019. The show is about an aspiring actor, Cary (Drew Tarver), and his sister Brooke (Heléne Yorke), a former professional dancer, who try to find their place in the world while wrestling with their feelings about their 13-year-old brother Chase's (Case Walker) sudden rise to internet fame.

== Personal life ==
Schneider married Late Night writer Mike Karnell on July 7, 2018, at Brittland Manor in Chestertown, Maryland. Among the guests were Seth Meyers, Kate McKinnon, Samira Wiley, Lauren Morelli, Bobby Flay, and Heléne Yorke.

== Awards ==
Nominations

- 69th Primetime Emmy Awards – Outstanding Writing for a Variety Special (Saturday Night Live)
- 68th Primetime Emmy Awards – Outstanding Writing for a Variety Special (Saturday Night Live)
- 67th Primetime Emmy Awards – Outstanding Writing for a Variety Special (Saturday Night Live 40th Anniversary Special)
- 66th Primetime Emmy Awards – Outstanding Original Music And Lyrics (Saturday Night Live)
- 65th Primetime Emmy Awards – Outstanding Writing for a Variety Series (Saturday Night Live)
- 65th Primetime Emmy Awards – Outstanding Writing for a Variety Special (Saturday Night Live Weekend Update Thursday)
- 64th Primetime Emmy Awards – Outstanding Writing for a Variety Series (Saturday Night Live)
- 63rd Primetime Emmy Awards – Outstanding Writing for a Variety Series (Saturday Night Live)
