= Brandon Scott Jones =

American actor and writer

- Born: Bel Air, Maryland, U.S.
- Occupations: Actor, comedian, writer, director
- Years active: 2003–present

Brandon Scott Jones is an American actor, comedian, and writer. He is best known for his role as Captain Isaac Higgintoot in the CBS series Ghosts and as Donny in the Warner Bros./Netflix film Isn't It Romantic.

== Life and career ==
Jones was born in Bel Air, Maryland, and studied at the New York Conservatory for Dramatic Arts in New York City. He is a regular performer at the Upright Citizens Brigade Theatre in New York and Los Angeles. In 2015, Jones was named one of Comedy Central's Comics to Watch. In 2021, he received his breakthrough role as Captain Isaac Higgintoot on the supernatural sitcom Ghosts on CBS, for which he was nominated for the Critics' Choice Television Award for Best Supporting Actor in a Comedy Series. The following year, he co-wrote and starred in the film Senior Year. In 2021, Scott voiced Joseph Tumulty in the Crooked Media produced podcast series Edith! about Edith Bolling Wilson.

== Selected filmography ==
Year	Title	Contribution	Note
2012	UCB Comedy Originals	Writer	TV series
2015	Honchos	Writer	TV series
2018	The Demons of Dorian Gunn	Writer, co-creator, co-executive producer	TV pilot
2021	The Other Two	Writer, co-producer	TV series
2022	Senior Year	Writer	Feature film

=== Film ===
Year	Title	Role	Notes
2016	Other People	Andrew	
2016	Don't Think Twice	Audience Chuck	
2018	Can You Ever Forgive Me?	Glen	
2019	Isn't It Romantic	Donny	
2022	Senior Year	Mr. T	
2023	Renfield	Mark	

=== Television ===
Year	Title	Role	Notes
2003	All My Children	Teenage Friend	1 episode
2008-2014	Stone Cold Fox	Various characters	
2009	Rhonda Casting	Brandon	1 episode
2009-2012	UCB Comedy Originals		5 episodes
2012	Jest Originals	Drew / Brian	2 episodes
2013	Rejected Pitches	Steven E. de Souza	1 episode
2013	Late Show with David Letterman	Brandon	1 episode
2013	Very Mary-Kate	Olivier Sarkozy	4 episodes
2014	Ramsey Has a Time Machine	Paul Friedman	1 episode
2015–16	The Late Show with Stephen Colbert	Reince Priebus / Kevin Graham	2 episodes
2016	The Characters	Steve / Ben J.	2 episodes
2016	Girls	Sam	1 episode
2016	Broad City	Hairdresser	1 episode
2016	Difficult People	Driver	1 episode
2017	Above Average Presents	Man	4 episodes
2019	Schooled	Dr. Ness	1 episode
2019–20	The Good Place	John Wheaton	9 episodes
2019–23	The Other Two	Curtis Paltrow	10 episodes
2021–present	Ghosts	Captain Isaac Higgintoot	Regular
2026–present	Invincible	William Francis Clockwell (voice)	

== Awards and nominations ==
Year	Result	Award	Category	Work	Ref.
2022	Nominated	Critics' Choice Television Awards	Best Supporting Actor in a Comedy Series	Ghosts	
2022	Nominated	Saturn Awards	Best Supporting Actor in a Network or Cable Television Series	Ghosts	
