= Scilla Andreen =

American filmmaker and costume designer

- Born: Scilla Heather Andreen; November 16, 1961 (age 64); Sacramento, California, U.S.
- Occupations: CEO, Producer, Director, Costume Designer
- Years active: 1986–present

Scilla Andreen (born November 16, 1961) is an American filmmaker, producer, director and costume designer. She is best known as the CEO and co-founder of Indieflix; a global entertainment screening and streaming service based in Seattle, Washington. She founded the IndieFlix Foundation, a non-profit organization dedicated to addressing mental health, resilience and kindness in schools.

== Early life and career ==
Scilla Heather Andreen was born in Sacramento, California November 16, 1961 to her Chinese mother Mei Ling Andreen and Swedish, French and British father, Stanley Berner Andreen. Andreen grew up in the mountains of Breckenridge, Colorado and attended the Summit County School system. Her father was a professional developer and developed Breckenridge's Peak Nine, Copper Mountain, Keystone and Vail ski resorts. Andreen moved with her family to Seattle, Washington in the 1970s where she attended Lakeside School. She enrolled in NYU to study political science, but soon dropped out after meeting a commercial director. Andreen was married in 1986 to Jason David Hernandez from Houston, Texas. They met while working on a low budget indie movie and were married a year later for 18 years before being divorced in 2004. They have 2 children, Ian Alexander Hernandez Andreen and Natalie Grace Hernandez Andreen. Scilla and her long time love of 15 years, Eric Michael Winn, have a blended family including children, Rashel, Jesse, and twins Ally and Arin Winn.

Andreen started working in high end commercials and industrials until she landed her first job as a costume designer on a small independent movie called Dirty Laundry. She continued working on independent films until she landed the position as costume designer on The Wonder Years (1989-1993) for which she garnered an Emmy nomination for Best Costume Design. From there she went on to work on Party of Five (1994-1999) with Neve Campbell, Scott Wolf, Lacey Chabert, Jennifer Love Hewitt and Matt Fox, the pilot of Dawson’s Creek (1998) with Katie Holmes, episodes of Smallville, Jack & Jill (2000-2001) with Amanda Peet, Sarah Paulson, Justin Kirk and Ivan Sergei. She then went on to her first sitcom, What I Like About You (2002-2005), with Amanda Bynes and Jennie Garth. While on hiatus from the show, she produced and directed and features. Her first short film she produced, Mutual Love Life (1999), received Oscar consideration as Top 10 Live Action Short. She then worked as associate producer for Bit Players, which led her to her first trip to Sundance Film Festival.

== Indieflix ==
In 2005, Andreen launched Indieflix; a global DVD, on-demand subscription, streaming and screening service that serves independent filmmakers and provides social impact films, television, shorts and documentaries to create positive change in the world. IndieFlix has amassed over ten thousand titles from 85 countries and has secured worldwide rights on a revenue share basis. In 2007, she transitioned the library to streaming delivery and created the RPM model (Revenue per minute) paying filmmakers for every minute watched. In 2016 she successfully pivoted the streaming service to be edutainment focused, and now streams over 5,000 curated features, documentaries, shorts and TV series. Andreen additionally oversees the creation and streaming of IndieFlix original social impact documentaries to thousands of schools, corporations and communities in over 50 countries; effectively connecting the off and online worlds through film.

IndieFlix also supports a variety of documentaries through the IndieFlix Distribution Lab whose messages merge with social campaigns. Unlike most other distribution companies, IndieFlix operates on a Royalty Pool Minutes (RPM) platform, which pays filmmakers based on how many minutes their films are viewed on various devices instead of a flat licensing fee. This methodology allows filmmakers to keep the “lion's share”of the money. She was included in Variety’s Impact Report as an Executive making a difference, a popular speaker at Sundance, Cannes, CES, SXSW and Women in Film.

== Film (Costume Design) ==
Year	Title	Notes
1989	The Wizard	Cast Including Fred Savage, Christian Slater, Tobey Maguire – Directed by Todd Holland
1989-1993	The Wonder Years	Cast Including Fred Savage, Danica McKellar – TV Series 97 episodes
1992	Bonnie & Clyde: The True Story	Cast Including Tracey Needham, Dana Ashbrook
1994	Moment of Truth: Cradle of Conspiracy	Cast Including Danica McKellar, Dee Wallace
1995	3 Ninjas Knuckle Up	Cast Including Victor Wong, Charles Napier - TriStar Pictures
1998	Dawson’s Creek	Cast Including James Van Der Beek, Katie Holmes – TV Series
1999	Jack & Jill	Cast Including Amanda Peet, Ivan Sergei – TV Series
1994-2000	Party of Five	Cast Including Neve Campbell, Jennifer Love Hewitt – TV Series 141 episodes
2004	Listen Up	Cast Including Jason Alexander, Malcolm-Jamal Warner – TV Series Pilot
2002-2005	What I Like About You	Cast Including Amanda Bynes, Jennie Garth – TV Series 63 episodes

== Film (Producer) ==
Year	Title	Notes
1999	Mutual Love Life	Winner – Best Short Film – Slamdance Film Festival
2000	Bit Players	Lead cast Verne Troyer
2002	Outpatient	Winner – Best Feature Film – New York International Independent Film Festival
2002	The Flats	Lead Cast Chad Lindberg
2014	The Empowerment Project: Ordinary Women Doing Extraordinary Things	Nominated - Chicago/Midwest Emmy Awards
2016	Screenagers	Winner - Jury Award – Stony Brook Film Festival
2016	Grow Op	Matt Skerritt Director
2017	Angst	Matt Skerritt Director
2017	Angst: Raising Awareness About Anxiety	Matt Skerritt Director – Lead Cast Michael Phelps
2018	Like: A Documentary About The Impact Of Social Media On Our Lives	

== Awards and nominations ==
Year	Award	Category	Work	Result
1989	Primetime Emmy	Outstanding Costume Design for a Series	The Wonder Years	Nominated
1989	Academy of Television Arts & Sciences	Best Costume Design for a Television Series	The Wonder Years	Nominated
2016	Academy of Television Arts & Sciences	Best Feature Documentary	The Empowerment Project	Nominated
