= Monster High: The Movie =

2022 live-action musical film

- Official release poster
- Genre: Musical; Fantasy
- Based on: The Monster High fashion doll line by Mattel
- Written by: Jenny Jaffe; Billy Eddy; Matt Eddy
- Story by: Jenny Jaffe; Greg Erb; Jason Oremland
- Directed by: Todd Holland
- Starring: Miia Harris; Ceci Balagot; Nayah Damasen
- Music by: Sunna Wehrmeijer
- Countries of origin: Canada; United States
- Original language: English

Production
- Executive producers: Todd Holland; Adam Bonnett; Frederic Soulie; Philip "Phil" Breman
- Running time: 92 minutes
- Production companies: Mattel Television; Brightlight Pictures; Nickelodeon Productions

Original release
- Network: Paramount+; Nickelodeon
- Release: October 6, 2022

Related
- Monster High 2 (2023)

Monster High: The Movie (titled onscreen as Monster High) is a 2022 musical fantasy film directed by Todd Holland, produced by the television division of Mattel and Brightlight Pictures, written by Jenny Jaffe, Billy Eddy, and Matt Eddy with a story by Jaffe, Greg Erb, and Jason Oremland, and starring Miia Harris, Ceci Balagot, and Nayah Damasen. The cast includes Case Walker, Lina Lecompte, Justin Derickson, Jy Prishkulnik, Kyle Selig, Marci T. House, Scotch Ellis Loring, Lilah Fitzgerald, Nasiv Sall, and Steve Valentine. In the United States, it was released on both Paramount+ and Nickelodeon on October 6, 2022.

Based on the Monster High fashion doll franchise by Mattel, it is one of two projects announced on February 23, 2021, alongside an animated series as part of a second Monster High brand relaunch.

A sequel titled Monster High 2 premiered on October 5, 2023.

== Plot ==
Clawdeen Wolf is a hybrid half-werewolf girl, born from human father Apollo and werewolf mother Selena. On her 15th birthday, she receives an acceptance letter to study at Monster High. Although reluctant, Apollo lets her attend only if she hides her human side as officially humans aren't allowed.

Upon arriving at Monster High, Clawdeen befriends Frankie Stein, a non-binary, brilliant Franken-monster and falls in love with Deuce Gorgon, son of Medusa. She also meets Draculaura, daughter of Count Dracula; Cleo de Nile, Deuce's ex-girlfriend and daughter of the Mummy; Lagoona Blue, a Colombian sea monster; and zombie Ghoulia Yelps. The school's Headmistress Bloodgood invites Clawdeen, as daughter of an alum, to represent the students at a Monster High Council on the upcoming Founder's Day.

Clawdeen discovers that she temporarily transforms into a human when feeling strong emotions, particularly around Deuce. During class, her professor Mr. Komos recounts the story of Edward "Eddy" Hyde, a former student and half-monster who was expelled when his human side was discovered, allowing him to be killed by hunters. He says Hyde's secret lab is in the school and that he created a formula to transform himself into a full-blooded monster, but wasn't able to test it as he was killed beforehand. Clawdeen decides to find and drink the formula.

Frankie discovers Clawdeen's secret, but instead of shunning her, they help her look for Hyde's lab in the school graveyard. There, they find Draculaura practicing the forbidden witchcraft which they promise to keep secret in exchange for help. They find the lab, but it has a lock that only a certain hand can open.

Draculaura finds a spell that might unlock the lab with ogre's bone as one of the ingredients. Clawdeen collects some from Bloodgood's mug and is nearly caught by Cleo, but Draculaura casts a spell to change Clawdeen's likeness. The next ingredient is snake's venom, which Clawdeen obtains from Deuce's hair; they develop feelings for each other after gaining each other's trust.

Later, Clawdeen, Frankie and Draculaura complete the spell, but can't unlock the lab and are caught by Bloodgood, Komos, and Cleo, the latter of whom told Bloodgood about Draculaura's practicing witchcraft. As the school starts to quake, Bloodgood realizes that there is an "untrue monster heart" among them.

The next day, feeling she's putting everyone at risk, Clawdeen leaves the school. Draculaura and Frankie follow and convince her to return, promising to help her no matter what. On Founder's Day, they discover Clawdeen's transformed human hand can open Hyde's lab. Initially it seems to simply be an ogre's tomb, but they find Hyde's lab and formula behind a hidden door.

Clawdeen almost drinks the formula, but is reluctant to give up her human half. Suddenly, Mr. Komos appears, revealing he is also part human and telling her that giving up on yourself isn't the answer. When she hands it to him, he drinks it instead. Revealing he is Hyde's son, Komos seeks to avenge his father's death by destroying Monster High.

Komos transforms into a full-blooded monster who can absorb monsters' powers, taking Draculaura's first. After locking him in the lab, Clawdeen, Frankie and Draculaura call Cleo for help, who arrives with Lagoona, Deuce, Ghoulia, Abbey and Heath. Komos escapes and steals Deuce's powers next, transforming Deuce into stone; Clawdeen, heartbroken, transforms into a full human, to everyone's shock. Clawdeen uses Cleo's phone to make Mr. Komos see his own reflection, petrifying him and returning Draculaura and Deuce's powers. Bloodgood, Dracula, and the Monster High Council arrive in time, discovering both Komos' intentions and Clawdeen's secret.

The next day, Apollo arrives to take Clawdeen back to the human world. Headmistress Bloodgood surprises them by stating that she's not expelling her because of her "true monster heart" and Dracula states they are rewriting the school's charter to acknowledge that not all humans are bad. Clawdeen is welcomed as their first official human-blooded student, Dracula allows Draculaura to practice witchcraft, and Deuce runs for student council. Clawdeen is celebrated by everyone.

In an unknown place, a witch watches through a crystal ball and instructs her minions to bring Draculaura to her so they can use her to end the war between witches and vampires.

== Cast ==
The cast were announced as follows:

- Miia Harris as Clawdeen Wolf, daughter of Apollo and Selena, and best friend to Frankie and Draculaura, and Deuce's girlfriend. She is half-werewolf and half-human, and a bit sheltered since she was raised in the human world, but is very caring and cares deeply for her friends. At the end of the movie after Monster High is saved, it is implied she begins a romance with Deuce.
- Ceci Balagot as Frankie Stein, child of Frankenstein's monster, creation of Dr. and Dr. Stein, and best friend to Clawdeen and Draculaura. Born just 15 days ago and assembled from some of the greatest geniuses in history, Frankie is Clawdeen's roommate. Unlike previous incarnations of the character, Frankie is made of different male and female body parts. Their brain was made from parts of the brains of Albert Einstein, Marie Curie, Plato, and "a woman named Liz" who was not given credit for apparently creating the Internet, while their cerebral part is made a part of Alan Turing's brain, the heart is from a fisherman, and the thigh of her late uncle Phil.
- Nayah Damasen as Draculaura, daughter of Count Dracula and friend of Frankie Stein and Clawdeen Wolf. A bit of a rebel, she's obsessed with magic, specifically witchcraft, even though it's strictly forbidden.
- Case Walker as Deuce Gorgon, son of Medusa and Lyra, Heath's best friend, Cleo's ex-boyfriend, and Clawdeen's love interest. Due to his gorgon powers, he is forced to wear glasses so he doesn't transform anyone into stone and hides his snakes under a hat so they don't bite anyone. He does get his powers taken by Mr. Komos/Hyde and is turned to stone, much to Clawdeen's horror, but is soon brought back to life after Hyde is defeated, and runs for student council at the end of the movie, and begins dating Clawdeen.
- Jy Prishkulnik as Cleo de Nile, daughter of the Mummy, Deuce's ex-girlfriend, Lagoona's best friend, and Monster High's resident Queen Bee.
- Kyle Selig as Mr. Komos / Edward "Eddy" Hyde Jr., a human-monster hybrid with horns and Monster High's resident "cool teacher". Mr. Komos is incredibly trustworthy and offers Clawdeen guidance and advice for how to fit in at Monster High. But he is revealed to be the son of half-human half-monster Edward "Eddy" Hyde who got killed by humans after being expelled from Monster High.
- Steve Valentine as Count Dracula, Draculaura's dad, a friend of Bloodgood, and a member of Monster High Council. Dracula pressures Draculaura in order for her to become an excellent student, just like him.
- Marci T. House as Headless Headmistress Bloodgood, the headless horsewoman who is Monster High's tough-but-fair headmistress and a stickler for following the rules.
- Scotch Ellis Loring as Apollo, a human who is Clawdeen's father. Unlike most humans, Apollo never had a bad opinion on monsters, he loves his daughter and wife very much, not caring for the fact the two are werewolves (Clawdeen half werewolf).
- Lina Lecompte as Lagoona Blue, daughter of the sea monster and a sea nymph. She is Cleo's best friend.
- Justin Derickson as Heath Burns, son of the Fire Elementals and Deuce's best friend.
- Lilah Fitzgerald as Ghoulia Yelps, daughter of the Zombies. Unlike previous Monster High projects, Ghoulia actually speaks and doesn't limp around.
- Nasiv Sall as Abbey Bominable, the daughter of the Yetis.
- Ajay Banks as Greigor, the hunchback janitor at Monster High.
- Artemis Pebdani as a Witch who instructs her minions to bring Draculaura to her.

=== Voices ===
- Brian Dobson as voice of the Eye in Headless Headmistress Bloodgood's giant clock.
- Natasha Leggero as the voice of Skullette, a skull who serves as Monster High's PA system.

== Production ==
=== Background and context ===
Monster High is an American fashion doll franchise created by Garrett Sander for Mattel, with illustrations by Kellee Riley and Glen Hanson, and was launched on June 11, 2010. Initially consisting only of dolls and a web series, it soon expanded to also include other various consumer products mainly marketed towards children, such as other types of toys, clothing, accessories, books, comics, stationery and other forms of merchandise. Featuring characters inspired by monster movies, sci-fi horror, thriller fiction, folklore, mythology and popular culture, this franchise involves teenage children of famous monsters and creatures of which the principal list are Draculaura, Frankie Stein, Clawdeen Wolf, Cleo de Nile and Lagoona Blue attending a high school with the same name as the franchise itself. The first two film specials were animated in Flash by WildBrain Entertainment which later switched to CGI animation by Nerd Corps Entertainment in 2012 starting with Why Do Ghouls Fall in Love? and ending in 2016 with Great Scarrier Reef. The franchise was rebooted in 2016 with a reboot and origin story film special called Welcome to Monster High, using revamped face molds, upgraded animation technologies and techniques, which was not well received by critics and fans and led to its initial cancellation on February 9, 2018.

Before the announcement of the film, there was a previous attempt at making a live-action Monster High film in the brand's launch year of 2010. Universal Pictures (then Universal Studios) announced that a live-action, around-the-world musical adventure film would be directed by Ari Sandel, written by Craig Zadan, Neil Meron, Stephanie Savage and Josh Schwartz, with the latter two handling the screenplay and given a scheduled release date of October 7, 2016. Nothing was said since the announcement.

=== Development ===
On February 23, 2021, Mattel, through its television division, announced the second return of the Monster High brand, promising new content and products for the following year, including a new animated series and a live-action film based on the franchise, both of which will air on Nickelodeon in the United States. On November 9, 2021, the film's cast and director were revealed with the latter being Todd Holland (who directed 50 episodes of The Larry Sanders Show, 26 episodes of Malcolm in the Middle and the 1989 film The Wizard) and the former at time of announcement being Miia Harris as Clawdeen Wolf, Ceci Balagot as Frankie Stein and Nayah Damasen as Draculaura.

=== Promotion ===
On June 30, 2022, a trailer of Monster High: The Movie was uploaded to Nickelodeon's official YouTube channel.

=== Release ===
The film was simultaneously released on Paramount+ and Nickelodeon on October 6, 2022. It was released on DVD on August 15, 2023, by Paramount Home Entertainment.

== Soundtrack ==
No.	Title	Artist(s)	Length
1.	"Coming Out of The Dark"	Miia Harris; Nayah Damasen; Ceci Balagot; Case Walker	2:53
2.	"We Are Monster High"	Good Newz Girls	2:50
3.	"Three of Us"	Miia Harris; Nayah Damasen; Ceci Balagot	1:58
4.	"True Monster Heart"	Kyle Selig; Nayah Damasen; Case Walker; Ceci Balagot; Justin Derickson; Jy Prishkulnik	2:50
5.	"Here I Am"	Good Newz Girls	2:27
6.	"Trust"	Miia Harris; Case Walker	2:06
7.	"Spark"	Good Newz Girls	2:41
8.	"Coming Out of The Dark (Reprise)"	Miia Harris	0:43
9.	"No Apologies"	Miia Harris; Nayah Damasen; Ceci Balagot; Case Walker	3:05
10.	"Triple Up"	Miia Harris; Nayah Damasen; Ceci Balagot	2:17
11.	"This Is Who I Am"	Josh Varnadore	2:45
Total length:			26:42

== Reception ==
The film has an 83% approval rating based on six reviews at Rotten Tomatoes.

== Sequel ==
On October 25, 2022, a sequel titled Monster High 2 was announced. Production began on February 7, 2023. It premiered on October 5, 2023, on Nickelodeon and Paramount+.
