= Tiya Sircar =

American actress (born 1982)

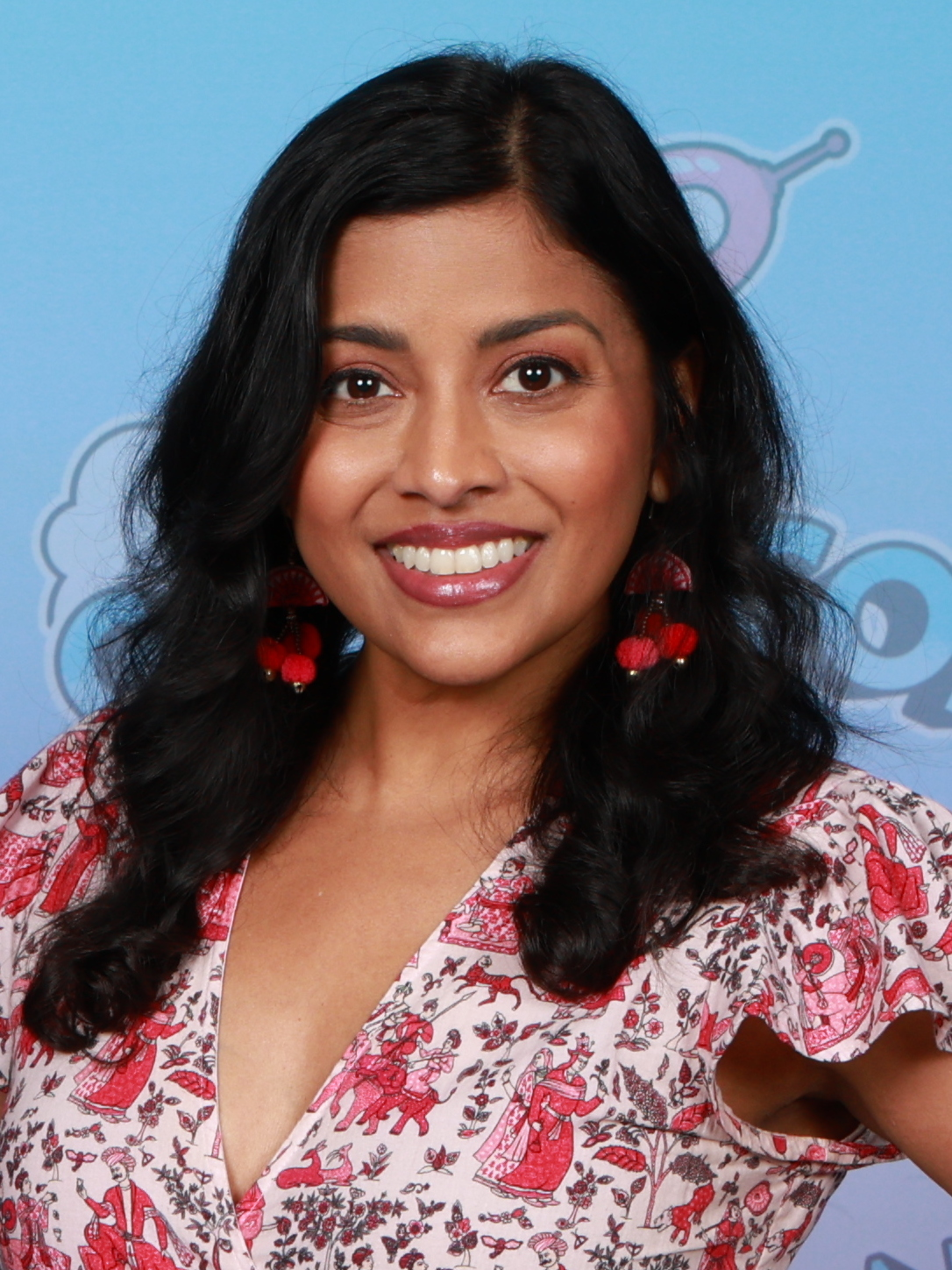
- Sircar at GalaxyCon Raleigh in 2024
- Born: May 16, 1982 (age 44); Arlington, Texas, U.S.
- Education: University of Texas at Austin
- Occupation: Actress
- Years active: 2005–present

Tiya Sircar (born May 16, 1982) is an American actress, known for her role as "Real Eleanor"/Vicky in The Good Place (2016–2020). She also provided the voice for Sabine Wren in Disney XD's Star Wars Rebels (2014–2018), played Rooni Schuman in ABC's Alex, Inc. (2018) and co-starred in The Internship (2013).

== Early life and education ==
Born and raised in Arlington, Texas, Sircar is the daughter of Bengali college professors from Kolkata, West Bengal, India. She took dancing and acting classes at a young age. She attended Ditto Elementary School and Martin High School, graduating in 2000. She then attended the University of Texas at Austin, during which time she interned at BLVD Talent Agency, which would go on to act as her first talent agency. The summer before her senior year, she was a tour guide in Rome. Sircar graduated with a BBA in Business/Marketing and a bachelor's in Theater & Dance. After graduation, she worked in sales at Dell before moving to Los Angeles to pursue her acting career.

== Career ==
Sircar's television appearances include Master of None, House, M.D., Hannah Montana, Greek, Moonlight, Numbers, Privileged, Terminator: The Sarah Connor Chronicles, and she has played recurring characters on The Suite Life on Deck and The Good Place. In 2008, she played a Mac Genius as part of Apple's national ad campaign. The following year, she voiced an animated character for the Disney show Phineas & Ferb. She was cast in New Line Cinema's 17 Again as "Samantha"–a high school senior with a crush on the lead character played by Zac Efron.

Sircar also appeared in the 2013 theatrical release The Internship, comedy also starring Vince Vaughn, Owen Wilson, and Rose Byrne. Sircar has stated that she often gets cast as ethnically ambiguous characters because she is not "Indian enough".

Sircar's voice acting for animation include the feature film Walking with Dinosaurs 3D and the television series Star Wars Rebels, which began airing on Disney XD in October 2014. Sircar provides the voice of Sabine Wren, a Mandalorian graffiti artist and explosives expert.

On March 24, 2014, it was announced that Sircar would star in the CBS/FOX pilot How I Met Your Dad, a spinoff of the successful How I Met Your Mother; however, CBS passed on the proposed project.

Sircar had a prominent role in the cast of the 2016 comedy television series The Good Place as Vicky, an ambitious demon (in a human suit the whole time), who develops a passion for acting after her superior demons order her to deceive and manipulate the protagonists using various pseudonyms and made-up scenarios.

In 2018, Sircar began a starring role opposite Zach Braff in ABC's Alex, Inc. The series was cancelled after one season. Sircar subsequently led the Netflix feature film Good Sam in 2019.

== Filmography ==
=== Film ===
Key
| † | Denotes films that have not yet been released |

| Year | Title | Role | Notes |
|---|---|---|---|
| 2005 | Heavenly Beauties | Indian Dancer | Short film |
| 2006 | The Insatiable | Lisa | |
| 2008 | The Rock Paper Scissors Show | Cecily | Short film |
| 2008 | Thy Kingdom Come | Amy | |
| 2009 | Hotel for Dogs | Marianne | |
| 2009 | 17 Again | Samantha | |
| 2009 | Just Peck | Becca | |
| 2011 | Friends with Benefits | Hostess | |
| 2012 | The Domino Effect | Sirisha | |
| 2012 | Breaking the Girls | Piper Sperling | |
| 2013 | The Lost Medallion: The Adventures of Billy Stone | Mohea | |
| 2013 | The Internship | Neha Patel | |
| 2013 | Walking with Dinosaurs | Juniper (voice) | |
| 2015 | Miss India America | Lily Prasad | |
| 2019 | Good Sam | Kate Bradley | |
| 2023 | Maximum Truth | Amy Klort | |
| 2023 | Ghosted | Patti | |

=== Television ===
| Year | Title | Role | Notes |
|---|---|---|---|
| 2007 | Acceptable.TV | Running Bear | Episode: "Red Carpet Bros/Mister Sprinkles/Gar/Who's Gonna Train Me?/Operation Kitten Calendar" |
| 2007 | House | Student #1 | Episode: "Human Error" |
| 2007 | Hannah Montana | Natasha | Episode: "Achy Jakey Heart: Part 1" |
| 2007 | Moonlight | Doctor #2 | Episode: "Dr. Feelgood" |
| 2008 | Terminator: The Sarah Connor Chronicles | Zoey | Episode: "The Turk" |
| 2008 | Greek | Emma | 2 episodes |
| 2008 | Numb3rs | Shaza Rafiq | Episode: "When Worlds Collide" |
| 2008 | Privileged | Precious | Episode: "All About Appearances" |
| 2008–09 | The Suite Life on Deck | Padma | 2 episodes |
| 2009 | Phineas and Ferb | Mishti Patel (voice) | Episode: "That Sinking Feeling" |
| 2010 | Make It or Break It | Morgan Webster | Episode: "Are We Having Fun Yet?" |
| 2010 | Better with You | Reena | Episode: "Pilot" |
| 2010 | The Vampire Diaries | Aimee Bradley | 3 episodes |
| 2011 | Georgetown | Harper Hawley | Unaired ABC pilot |
| 2011 | NCIS | Lauren Donnelly | Episode: "Freedom" |
| 2012 | Touch | Veronique / Nandu | Episode: "Zone of Exclusion" |
| 2013 | Emily Owens, M.D. | Chloe | Episode: "Emily and... the Perfect Storm" |
| 2013 | Betas | Divya | Episode: "Waiting for a Girl Like You" |
| 2013 | Witches of East End | Amy Matthews | Recurring role |
| 2014 | The Crazy Ones | Allie | 3 episodes |
| 2014 | How I Met Your Dad | Juliet | Unaired CBS/FOX pilot |
| 2014–18 | Star Wars Rebels | Sabine Wren (voice) | Main role |
| 2016 | Hell's Kitchen | Herself | Episode: "16 Chefs Compete" |
| 2016–20 | The Good Place | "The Real Eleanor"/Vicky Sengupta | Recurring role (seasons 1-4) |
| 2017 | Master of None | Priya | 2 episodes |
| 2017 | The Mindy Project | Claire | Episode: "Bat Mitzvah" |
| 2017–18 | Star Wars Forces of Destiny | Sabine Wren (voice) | Main role |
| 2017–20 | Spirit Riding Free | Miss Flores (voice) | Main role |
| 2018 | Alex, Inc. | Arunima 'Rooni' Schuman | Main role |
| 2018 | Supergirl | Fiona Byrne | 2 episodes |
| 2018 | Christmas Lost and Found | Whitney Kennison | Television film |
| 2019–22 | Young Justice: Outsiders | Dolphin, Coral, Chian (voice) | Recurring role (5 episodes) |
| 2019 | Christmas 9 TO 5 | Jennifer Clarke | Television film |
| 2020 | The Fugitive | Pritti Patel | Main cast |
| 2020 | Robot Chicken | Gwen Stefani / Beverly Marsh (voice) | Episode: "Ghandi Mulholland in: Plastic Doesn't Get Cancer" |
| 2020 | American Dad! | Train Actor (voice) | Episode: "The Last Ride of the Dodge City Rambler" |
| 2020 | Christmas on Wheels | Ashley | Television film |
| 2021 | The Simpsons | Bette (voice) | Episode: "Uncut Femmes" |
| 2021 | Guilty Party | Fiona | Main cast |
| 2021 | Station Eleven | Siya Chaudhary | Episode: "Wheel of Fire" |
| 2021–22 | Mira, Royal Detective | Queen of Nayapuram / Mongoose Mother / Mongoose Auntie (voice) | Recurring role |
| 2022 | The Afterparty | Jennifer #1 | Recurring role |
| 2022 | A Gingerbread Christmas | Hazel Stanley | Television film |
| 2026 | Scarpetta | Blaise Fruge | Recurring role |

=== Video games ===
| Year | Title | Voice role | Notes |
|---|---|---|---|
| 2015 | Disney Infinity 3.0 | Sabine Wren | |

== Awards and nominations ==
| Year | Association | Category | Nominated work | Result |
|---|---|---|---|---|
| 2015 | Los Angeles Asian Pacific Film Festival | Best Actress - Narrative Feature | Miss India America | Won |
| 2015 | Behind the Voice Actors Awards | Best Female Lead Vocal Performance in a Television Series - Action/Drama | Star Wars Rebels | Nominated |
