= Kyle Selig =

American actor, dancer and singer (born 1992)

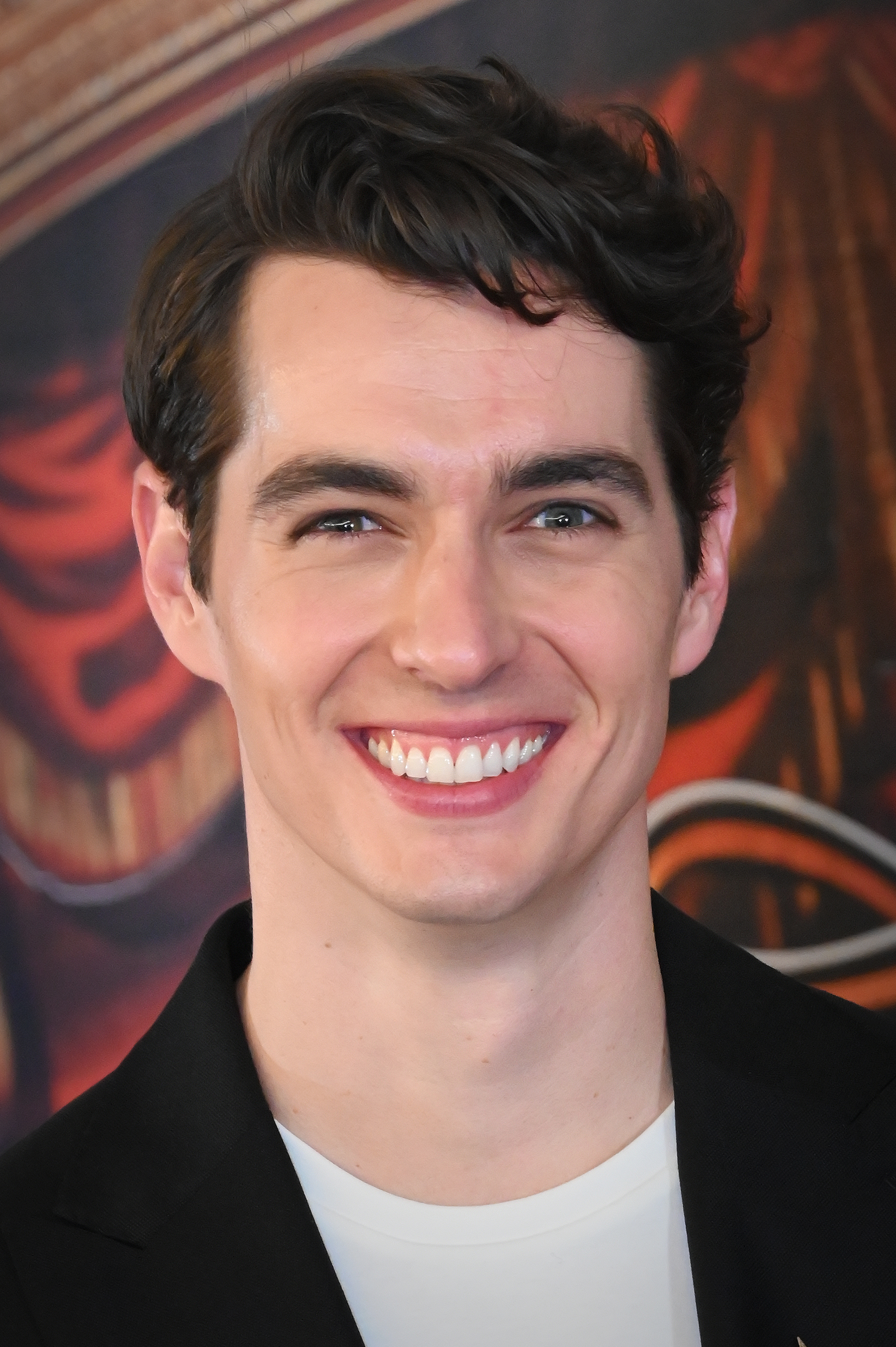
- Selig in 2025
- Born: Kyle Andrew Selig; September 28, 1992 (age 34); Orange County, California, U.S.
- Education: Carnegie Mellon University (BFA)
- Occupations: Actor; dancer; singer
- Years active: 2012–present
- Spouse: Erika Henningsen (m. 2023)

Kyle Andrew Selig (born September 28, 1992) is an American actor, dancer, and singer. He is best known for originating the role of Aaron Samuels in the 2018 Tony Award-nominated musical, Mean Girls. Selig made his Broadway debut in 2013 as Elder Kevin Price in The Book of Mormon, and in 2024, he took over the starring role of Jacob Jankowski in Water for Elephants on Broadway. He also played the role of Mr. Komos in Monster High: The Movie.

== Early life and education ==
Selig was raised in Huntington Beach, California. He is the son of Stuart and Sharon (née Kennedy) Selig and has a half-brother, Riley and half-sister, Harmony.

Selig first became interested in theatre after seeing his older sister performing a local play. As his interest grew, he often attended musical theatre intensives, such as Collaborative Arts Project 21 (CAP21), during his summer breaks.

He graduated from Huntington Beach High School in 2010 and was named prom king at the end of his senior year. At HBHS, he attended the district magnet program, the Huntington Beach Academy for the Performing Arts, as a Musical Theater major and played the lead Don Lockwood in Singin' in the Rain. In June 2010, at the age of 17, Selig won the National High School Musical Theatre Award (also known as the Jimmy Award) along with a $10,000 scholarship. He then attended the Carnegie Mellon University, earning a Bachelor of Fine Arts (BFA) in musical theatre in 2014.

== Career ==
In August 2013, while still attending Carnegie Mellon University, Selig was cast as the standby for the lead role of Elder Kevin Price in the Broadway production of The Book of Mormon. He remained with the company as its standby for three months, earning credit towards his undergraduate degree via independent study. Months later in December of that same year, Selig joined the second national touring production of The Book of Mormon again as a standby for the role of Elder Price.

Selig left The Book of Mormon tour on July 26, 2014, to begin rehearsals for the national tour of the musical, Pippin, in which he was cast as the musical's titular character. Selig rehearsed with the touring company of Pippin but was placed on vocal rest just one week before the tour was scheduled to open. He was then replaced by Matthew James Thomas, who originated the role of Pippin in the recent Broadway revival. Despite being said to be on a medical leave of absence, Selig never rejoined the touring company; but instead, when Thomas left the production, he was replaced by Kyle Dean Massey. In interviews, Selig has alluded to being fired "from one of his first big jobs," but has never publicly confirmed his being fired from the Pippin tour.

Selig rejoined the Broadway cast of The Book of Mormon in February 2015 as an ensemble replacement and Elder Price standby. His first performance as Elder Price on Broadway took place on April 15, 2015. For seven weeks in early 2016, he led the Broadway company of The Book of Mormon as Elder Price, replacing Gavin Creel, who left the production to star in She Loves Me. On February 21, 2016, Selig left the production and was replaced by Nic Rouleau. He led the company again for two weeks in February 2022.

In the summer of 2016, he appeared as Baby John in West Side Story at the Hollywood Bowl with the Los Angeles Philharmonic, alongside Jeremy Jordan and Karen Olivo. Selig starred as Homer Hickam in the musical, October Sky, inspired by the film of the same name at the Old Globe Theatre in San Diego in the fall of 2016. In the spring of 2017, Selig portrayed Dauphin in The Public Theater's world premiere of the off-Broadway rock musical, Joan of Arc: Into the Fire directed by Alex Timbers.

Selig starred as Aaron Samuels in the Tony Award-nominated Broadway musical, Mean Girls, written by Tina Fey with music and lyrics by Jeff Richmond and Nell Benjamin, respectively. The show had its world premiere as an out-of-town tryout at the National Theatre in Washington, D.C., from October 31 to December 3, 2017, in which Selig originated the role. The musical, which is based on the film of the same name, began previews on March 12, 2018, and officially opened on Broadway on April 8, 2018, at the August Wilson Theatre. In December 2019, it was announced that Selig would be taking a leave of absence from Mean Girls, and internet personality and actor, Cameron Dallas, would be filling the role of Aaron Samuels for four-week engagement. The production and Selig's final performance was March 11, 2020. The show closed due to the COVID-19 pandemic and it was announced on January 7, 2021, that it would not reopen after the pandemic ends.

In March 2019, Selig portrayed Gene, opposite Mean Girls co-star Erika Henningsen, in Stephen Sondheim's Saturday Night at Second Stage Theater, as a part of the theater's "Musical Mondays" weekly concert series.

On March 16, 2021, Selig released his first album.

It was announced on August 15, 2024 that Selig would return to Broadway in Water for Elephants, replacing Grant Gustin in the starring role of Jacob Jankowski beginning September 3, 2024 until the show closed on December 8.

In January 2025, it was announced Selig would replace Ryan McCartan (who left the cast before opening) in Stephen Sondheim's Old Friends at the Ahmanson Theatre in February and Broadway’s Samuel J. Friedman Theatre from March to June.

In 2026 he was cast in NBC's Chicago P.D., playing FBI agent Charlie Boyden, a recurring character.

== Philanthropy and social activism ==
In August 2018, Selig participated in Covenant House's Stage & Screen Sleep Out along with Mean Girls co-stars Ashley Park and Curtis Holland, and together they raised over $14,000 for this organization which provides shelter, food, and crisis care for homeless and runaway youth. Selig also has served as a mentor and held masterclasses for aspiring performers.

== Personal life ==
Selig has been in a relationship with fellow actor Erika Henningsen, since 2018. The two announced their engagement on July 1, 2021, after a trip to Hawaii. Selig married Henningsen on May 22, 2023, in New York City.

== Theatre credits ==
Credits in bold indicate Broadway production(s):

Year	Title	Role	Theatre	Director(s)	Ref.
2012	The Glorious Ones	Francesco	Rose Center Theater	Joanna Syiek	
2013	**The Book of Mormon**	**Elder Kevin Price** (standby)	**Eugene O'Neill Theatre**	Casey Nicholaw and Trey Parker	
2013–14	**The Book of Mormon**	**Elder Kevin Price** (standby)	U.S. National Tour	Casey Nicholaw and Trey Parker	
2014	Pippin	Pippin	U.S National Tour	Diane Paulus	
2015–16	**The Book of Mormon**	**Ensemble/Cunningham's Dad** (replacement); **Elder Kevin Price** (standby)	**Eugene O'Neill Theatre**	Casey Nicholaw and Trey Parker	
2016	**The Book of Mormon**	**Elder Kevin Price** (replacement)	**Eugene O'Neill Theatre**	Casey Nicholaw and Trey Parker	
2016	West Side Story	Baby John	Hollywood Bowl	Gustavo Dudamel	
2016	October Sky	Homer Hickam	Old Globe Theatre	Rachel Rockwell	
2017	Joan of Arc: Into the Fire	Dauphin	The Public Theater	Alex Timbers	
2017	**Mean Girls**	**Aaron Samuels**	National Theatre (out-of-town tryout)	Casey Nicholaw	
2018–20	**Mean Girls**	**Aaron Samuels**	**August Wilson Theatre**	Casey Nicholaw	
2019	Saturday Night	Gene	Tony Kiser Theatre	Noah Brody	
2022	**The Book of Mormon**	**Elder Kevin Price** (replacement) (Note: Nic Rouleau was supposed to play Elder Price in 2022, but due to an injury, Selig reprised his role for two weeks)	**Eugene O'Neill Theatre**	Casey Nicholaw and Trey Parker	
2024	**Water for Elephants**	**Jacob Jankowski** (replacement)	**Imperial Theatre**	Jessica Stone	
2025	**Stephen Sondheim's Old Friends**	**Performer**	Ahmanson Theatre	Matthew Bourne	
2025	**Stephen Sondheim's Old Friends**	**Performer**	**Samuel J. Friedman Theatre**	Matthew Bourne	

== Filmography ==
=== Television ===
Year	Title	Role	Notes	Ref.
2014	The Price Is Right	Himself	Episode: "April 8, 2014"	
2015	Billy on the Street	Himself (uncredited)	Episode: "Billy Helps Tina Fey Find a Friend"	
2018	Late Night with Seth Meyers	Aaron Samuels	Episode: "October 1, 2018"	
2019	Madam Secretary	Travis	2 episodes	
2019	Evil	Process Server	Episode: "Exorcism Part 2"	
2021	Christmas in Tahoe	Ryan Donaldson	Hallmark Channel television movie	
2021	The Housewives of the North Pole	Jake	Television movie	
2022	Girls5eva	D'Blaze	Episode: "B.P.E."	
2022	Monster High: The Movie	Mr. Komos	Television movie	
2022–2023	Welcome to Flatch	Dylan	Recurring role	
2023	Mulligan	Magneto	Episode: "Morning in America"	
2023	Monster High 2	Mr. Komos/Edward "Eddy" Hyde Jr.	Television movie	
2024	FBI: International	Ryan Karloski	Episode: "Red Light"	
2026	Chicago P.D.	Charlie Boyden	Ongoing	

=== Film ===
Year	Title	Role	Ref.
2023	Cat Person	Lucas	

== Discography ==
=== Cast recordings ===
- Mean Girls – Original Broadway Cast Recording (2018)

=== Albums ===
- Careful Days (2021)

=== Collaborative projects ===
- And the Tree Was Happy (2013)
- She Breathes (2016)
- Broadway's Carols for a Cure, Volume 20 (2018)
- Broadway's Carols for a Cure, Volume 21 (2019)

== Awards and nominations ==
=== Special honors and awards ===
- 2010 – National High School Musical Theatre Award
- 2018 – Arts Schools Network's Outstanding Arts School Alumni Award
