= How I Met Your Dad =

TV pilot based on How I Met Your Mother

- Genre: Sitcom; Romantic comedy; Comedy drama
- Created by: Carter Bays; Craig Thomas; Emily Spivey
- Written by: Carter Bays; Craig Thomas; Emily Spivey; Greta Gerwig
- Directed by: Rob Greenberg
- Starring: Greta Gerwig; Drew Tarver; Nicholas D'Agosto; Tiya Sircar; Andrew Santino
- Narrated by: Meg Ryan
- Composer: Michael Brake
- Country of origin: United States
- Original language: English
- No. of episodes: 1

Production
- Producers: Carter Bays; Craig Thomas; Pamela Fryman; Greta Gerwig; Emily Spivey
- Camera setup: Multi-camera
- Running time: 24 minutes
- Production companies: Bays & Thomas Productions; 20th Television

Related
- How I Met Your Mother; How I Met Your Father

How I Met Your Dad is a television pilot of a TV series to serve as a spin-off of How I Met Your Mother, created by original series creators Carter Bays and Craig Thomas, with Emily Spivey. This series was expected to debut 2014, but was shelved indefinitely. 20th Television opted not to order How I Met Your Dad to series. The plot focuses on Sally on the journey of how she met her daughter's father. She lives in New York with her friends, is getting divorced from her first husband, and has no idea what she is doing with her life.

In April 2021, it was announced that How I Met Your Father had been ordered to series by Hulu, based on a rewrite of the How I Met Your Dad pilot by Isaac Aptaker and Elizabeth Berger, and with Hilary Duff attached to play lead character Sophie.

== Plot summary ==
In the year 2044, Sally Javits (Meg Ryan) begins writing a series of letters to her daughter Cricket explaining how she met her father. In 2014, three days after separating from her first husband Gavin (Anders Holm) and moving in with her brother Danny (Andrew Santino) and his husband Todd (Drew Tarver), who themselves are seeking to adopt a baby, Sally (younger version played by Greta Gerwig) is set up on a blind date with Frank (Nicholas D'Agosto) by her best friend Juliet (Tiya Sircar), with the intent of having a one-night stand. After instead connecting deeply with Frank, Sally decides to reconnect with Gavin, only to change her mind after realizing Gavin would not even get out his best wine to celebrate them getting back together and they are too fundamentally different as a couple to continue being married. After Danny and Todd succeed in acquiring a surrogate mother to have a child with, the group go out drinking to celebrate, where Sally tells Frank that she believes it is best that they just be friends. In 2044, Sally reveals that Frank is her daughter's father.

== Production ==
On November 15, 2013, it was announced that CBS and the series' producer 20th Century Fox Television would launch How I Met Your Dad, a woman-centric variation executive-produced by Bays, Thomas, and Emily Spivey. The new series would possibly have featured a new bar and would not have tied into the original series. The primary cast of the series was revealed on March 14, 2014, to be Greta Gerwig, Drew Tarver, Nicholas D'Agosto, Krysta Rodriguez and Andrew Santino. Tiya Sircar was cast on March 26, 2014, replacing Krysta Rodriguez in the series. On April 23, 2014, Meg Ryan was announced to voice future Sally.

On May 14, 2014, CBS passed on picking up How I Met Your Dad since show creators Craig Thomas and Carter Bays did not want to reshoot the pilot. Nina Tassler, the entertainment president at CBS, stated that "there were elements of the pilot that didn't work out". Talks of the series being "shopped" to other networks emerged. Netflix, FOX and NBC were named as possible candidates for picking up the show.

Ultimately, nothing came of those talks. It was reported that the options on the cast contracts had expired and they had been released from their contracts and co-creator Carter Bays denied any rumors that the spin-off pilot will be reshot. On July 11, 2014, Bays confirmed that the spin-off project was officially dead. Six days later, Nina Tassler said that CBS would "love the opportunity to take another shot" at the pilot and that she would continue to "hound" Carter Bays and Craig Thomas, even though they shot down the idea of a new version of the project stating that they had both moved on.

In 2016, two years after the project was announced to be "dead", a full script of the pilot episode was leaked online. In 2020, 4 years after, the original full pilot episode, owned by 20th Century Studios and originally meant just for a sales presentation, was also leaked by Reddit user "howimetyourdadleak" on the How I Met Your Mother subreddit, which contains only some small changes from the previously leaked script.

== Cast and characters ==
- Greta Gerwig as Sally Javits
  - Meg Ryan as old Sally
- Drew Tarver as Todd
- Nicholas D'Agosto as Frank
- Tiya Sircar as Juliet
- Andrew Santino as Danny Javits
- Jake Ferree as Sally's Assistant
- Anders Holm as Gavin
- Ryan Lee as Justin
- Johnny 5 as Bar Patron #1
- Andra Petru as Bar Patron #2
