= The Other Two =

American sitcom

- Genre: Sitcom; Satire; Absurdist comedy
- Created by: Chris Kelly; Sarah Schneider
- Starring: Heléne Yorke; Drew Tarver; Case Walker; Ken Marino; Molly Shannon; Brandon Scott Jones; Josh Segarra
- Country of origin: United States
- Original language: English
- No. of seasons: 3
- No. of episodes: 30

Production
- Executive producers: Chris Kelly; Sarah Schneider; Lorne Michaels; Andrew Singer; Tony Hernandez; Blair Breard
- Producers: Daniel Hank; Ally Engelberg; Marc Lieberman; Micah Frank; Eddie Michaels; Gilli Nissim; Gwen Bialic
- Camera setup: Single-camera
- Running time: 21-44 minutes
- Production companies: Broadway Video; Jax Media; Kelly/Schneider; Comedy Partners; MTV Entertainment Studios

Original release
- Network: Comedy Central
- Release: January 24 – March 28, 2019
- Network: HBO Max
- Release: August 26, 2021 – May 18, 2023
- Network: Max
- Release: May 23 – June 29, 2023

The Other Two is an American satirical sitcom created by Chris Kelly and Sarah Schneider. The story follows two floundering millennial siblings who must grapple with their 13-year-old brother's overnight fame.

The Other Two aired for three ten-episode seasons, the first of which premiered in 2019 on Comedy Central, the second on HBO Max in 2021, and the third on HBO Max and Max in 2023. The series received near-unanimous critical acclaim throughout its run, as well as several award nominations.

== Premise ==
Cary, a gay aspiring actor, and his sister Brooke, a former professional dancer, try to find their place in the world while wrestling with their feelings about their 13-year-old brother Chase's sudden rise to Internet fame.

== Cast and characters ==
=== Main ===
- Heléne Yorke as Brooke Dubek, Cary and Chase's older sister and a former professional dancer, who wants to figure out her career path
- Drew Tarver as Cary Dubek, Brooke's younger brother, Chase's older brother, and an aspiring actor, who struggles to find roles
- Case Walker as Chase Dubek / ChaseDreams, Cary and Brooke's younger brother, who is thrust into stardom after a viral internet video
- Ken Marino as Streeter Peter Peters, ChaseDreams's newly hired manager
- Molly Shannon as Pat Dubek, the three siblings' Hollywood-ready mother (seasons 2–3; recurring season 1)
- Brandon Scott Jones as Curtis Paltrow, Cary's co-worker and confidant (season 3; recurring seasons 1–2)
- Josh Segarra as Lance Arroyo, Brooke's upbeat, sweet, and seemingly simple-minded ex who specializes in novelty footwear (season 3; recurring seasons 1–2)

=== Recurring ===
- Wanda Sykes as Shuli Kucerac, an executive from ChaseDreams's record label
- Andy Ridings as Matt, Cary's roommate, who swears he is straight but makes moves on Cary (season 1)
- Richard Kind as Skip Schamplin, Cary's agent who also has multiple odd jobs (season 1; guest season 3)
- Alison Rich as Melanie, a producer on Pat's show (seasons 2–3)
- Gideon Glick as Jess, Cary's love interest (season 2)
- Nadia Dajani as Mackenzie, Cary's agent (seasons 2–3)
- Fin Argus as Lucas Lambert Moy, an actor whom Cary dates, whose method acting prevents them from sleeping together (season 3)

=== Guest stars ===
- Beck Bennett as Jeff, Brooke's one-time lover and flight attendant (season 1)
- Ali Ahn as Jo, a realtor and friend of Brooke (seasons 1–3)
- Kate Berlant as Pitzi Pyle, a talent agent who meets with Cary (seasons 1 & 3)
- Jackie Hoffman as Lorraine, an actor hired as a body double for Chase (season 1)
- Josie Totah (Note: Credited as J. J. Totah; she came out as transgender in 2018.) as Elijah, a student with a crush on Cary (season 1)
- Daniel K. Isaac as Jeremy Delongpre, a teacher and love interest for Cary (season 1)
- Greta Lee as Genevieve Kim, a friend of Brooke from her dancing past (season 1)
- Jimmy Fowlie as Cameron Colby, an Instagay that befriends Cary (seasons 1–3)
- Heidi Gardner as Mona, a partier who gives Pat MDMA (season 1)
- Tuc Watkins and Noah Galvin as Troy and Eddie, a couple who pose as a father-son duo on Pat's talk show (season 2)
- Dana Delany as Emily Overruled, the star of a legal procedural Cary appears on (season 3)
- Ann Dowd as Paula Davies, the founder of a safe haven for ex-girlfriends of celebrities (season 3)

Kathie Lee Gifford, Hoda Kotb, Mario Lopez, Tinsley Mortimer, Michael Che, Andy Cohen, Patrick Wilson, Zosia Mamet, Debi Mazar, Ian Ziering, Tavi Gevinson, Jordana Brewster, Alessia Cara, Bowen Yang, Justin Bartha, Leah McSweeney, Dylan O'Brien, Kiernan Shipka, Lukas Gage, Simu Liu, Ben Platt, Cameron Kasky, Edie Falco, and Lawrence O'Donnell also appear as themselves.

== Episodes ==
Season	Episodes	Originally released		
Season	Episodes	First released	Last released	Network
1	10	January 24, 2019	March 28, 2019	Comedy Central
2	10	August 26, 2021	September 23, 2021	HBO Max
3	10	May 4, 2023	June 29, 2023	HBO Max / Max (Note: Season 3 premiered on HBO Max, which was rebranded as Max between release dates of episodes 4 and 5.)

=== Season 1 (2019) ===
No. overall	No. in season	Title	Directed by	Written by	Original release date	U.S. viewers (millions)
1	1	"Pilot"	Chris Kelly	Chris Kelly & Sarah Schneider	January 24, 2019 (Note: The show’s pilot was released online on December 21, 2018, before the premiere of the pilot on Comedy Central on January 24, 2019.)	0.303
Thirteen-year-old Chase Dubek (Case Walker) goes viral on YouTube under the moniker ChaseDreams and becomes a famous singer overnight. His two older siblings, Cary (Drew Tarver) and Brooke Dubek (Heléne Yorke), are forced to deal with Chase's sudden newfound fame. Cary, an aspiring gay actor, experiences a humiliating audition for a commercial, while former dancer Brooke has left her shoe-designing boyfriend Lance (Josh Segarra) and is in the middle of a career transition. Cary is confused about the intentions of his roommate Matt, who claims to be straight but consistently makes out with Cary and gives him mixed signals. Brooke and Cary have dinner with their supportive mother, Pat Dubek (Molly Shannon), who introduces them to Chase's newly hired narcissistic manager, Streeter (Ken Marino).
2	2	"Chase Goes to a Premiere"	Chris Kelly	Chris Kelly & Sarah Schneider	January 31, 2019	0.227
Brooke and Cary decide to tag along with Chase when his success on social media leads to an invitation to a movie premiere. They try to walk the red carpet, only to be stopped by an employee. At the afterparty, Brooke tries to mingle with various guests and ends up chatting with Brittlyn, a famous Instagram makeup artist. Brooke accepts an invitation to Brittlyn's home, unaware that the social media star is underage. Cary is told by his agent that he has to re-tape his commercial audition to sound "less gay"; Cary re-tapes his audition in the bathroom and gets the role.
3	3	"Chase Gets a Girlfriend"	Andrew DeYoung	Lucia Aniello & Paul W. Downs	February 7, 2019	0.235
Pat and Chase relocate to New York City and move into Justin Theroux's former apartment. In an effort to boost Chase's public image, Streeter arranges a romantic relationship between Chase and Yendani, another famous child singer, using the publicity to promote both musicians' upcoming albums and raise Chase's profile. An executive from Yendani's label, Shuli Kucerac (Wanda Sykes), gathers the Dubek family to discuss family controversies that could potentially tarnish Yendani's reputation. As a result, Brooke's social media accounts are deleted due to offensive content. Cary lands a role in an off-Broadway play and deliberately hurts himself in order to get closer to Matt. Recently fired from her realtor job, Brooke moves in with Pat and Chase and accepts a new gig as Chase's assistant.
4	4	"Chase Gets the Gays"	Anu Valia	Chris Kelly & Sarah Schneider	February 14, 2019	0.192
Chase releases his second single on YouTube entitled "My Brother's Gay and That's Okay!", which goes viral. When Cary begins getting recognized on the street because of the music video, he is forced to deal with his ongoing struggle to accept his sexuality. Cary ultimately confronts Matt about their relationship, affirming that he does not want to be strung along. Brooke is tasked with opening Chase's fan mail, and she is touched by a letter from a dying girl named Rachel Klein, whose wish is for a ChaseDreams T-shirt. When Brooke arrives at the hospital to personally deliver a shirt, she discovers that no patient by the name "Rachel Klein" exists. Convinced that "Rachel Klein" is actually a pedophile, Brooke tracks down the return address to berate the sender, only to realize that she has crashed a funeral.
5	5	"Chase Goes to a High School Dance"	Mike Karnell	Chris Kelly & Sarah Schneider	February 18, 2019	0.270
At Brooke's suggestion, Chase attends a high school dance in New Jersey with a young fan. Streeter accompanies Chase to the dance, but he's desperate to have Chase attend the launch of Lil Wayne's tequila line later that same evening. Brooke deals with Lorraine, a fifty-something actress Streeter has hired to be Chase's stand-in. When Chase expresses that he wants to stay at the dance, Streeter convinces Brooke to have Lorraine attend Lil Wayne's party as Chase. At the dance, Cary lives out the high school experience he missed when he was a teenager; he ends up bonding with Jeremy (Daniel K. Isaac), a drama teacher chaperoning the party, and the two share a kiss. Meanwhile, a gay high school student, Elijah (Josie Totah), becomes obsessed with Cary.
6	6	"Chase Shoots a Music Video"	Andrew DeYoung	Joel Kim Booster	February 25, 2019	0.217
On the set of Chase's new music video, Brooke begrudgingly reunites with background dancer Genevieve, a former acquaintance from Brooke's childhood dancing career. When Genevieve abruptly quits, Brooke decides to fill in as Chase's background dancer, but she is shocked by the inappropriate sexual content in the video. Pat appears on Watch What Happens Live with Andy Cohen to promote her children's book; Cary lands the bartender role at Pat's taping. During the interview, Pat tells the audience that her husband died of cancer. It is revealed that Chase's father did not actually die of cancer, and the family invented this story to tell Chase in order to cover up the real cause of death. Brooke ultimately gets Pat's revelation edited out of the show's final broadcast by agreeing to have clips of Watch What Happens Live appear in Chase's music video as product placement.
7	7	"Chase Gets a Nosebleed"	Anu Valia	Cole Escola	March 7, 2019	0.232
Cary wants to get a big role in a Ryan Murphy miniseries, but he learns that the casting director is only considering actors with more than 50,000 Instagram followers. In an attempt to boost his Instagram audience, Cary tries to befriend a group of famous "Instagays". Though the social media influencers initially welcome Cary to the fold, they ostracize him when they realize he is just using them to get followers. Meanwhile, Brooke discovers that it is hard to date with a famous brother when she discovers that her online date is just using her to get to Chase. Following multiple disastrous dates, Brooke resorts back to sleeping with Chase's personal trainer.
8	8	"Chase Turns Fourteen"	Andrew DeYoung	Chris Kelly & Sarah Schneider	March 14, 2019	0.216
Streeter throws Chase a fourteenth birthday party at a wildly inappropriate club. Jeremy attends the birthday party to reconnect with Cary, but he is turned off by Cary's sudden self-absorption and leaves. Pat gets high on molly and bonds with Streeter. When Chase gets drunk for the first time and passes out in the bathroom, Lance and Brooke sneak Chase out of the club and return him to the apartment. In the process, Brooke expresses her concerns over Chase's fame and well-being. After returning Chase to the apartment, Brooke and Lance share a kiss.
9	9	"Chase Drops His First Album"	Chris Kelly	Chris Kelly & Sarah Schneider	March 21, 2019	0.224
The Dubeks attend Chase's live-streamed album release party, which is being held mid-air on an airplane and happens to fall on their late father's birthday. Brooke and Cary are disconcerted when Chase announces on camera that, in dedication to his father, part of his album sales will be donated to the American Cancer Society; Shuli later confronts the Dubeks when a viewer claims that Chase's father did not die of cancer. After being pushed by Brooke and Cary to tell Chase the truth, Pat grows distraught and experiences a meltdown in front of Chase, the live audience, and the online viewers. She admits that her alcoholic husband froze to death on the roof of their home and that she lied to Chase in order to preserve the memory of his father. Following the incident, #MyDadFroze begins trending online, and Shuli reveals that Chase has been invited to perform at the MTV Video Music Awards.
10	10	"Chase Performs at the VMAs"	Chris Kelly	Chris Kelly & Sarah Schneider	March 28, 2019	0.200
Pat and Streeter appear to be dating. As Chase prepares for his VMA performance, Cary and Brooke both receive life-changing news: Cary learns that Netflix wants to do an original movie with Chase and him in starring roles, while Streeter offers Brooke the position of Chase's assistant manager. Brooke wants to get back together with Lance, but he rejects her. The Dubeks gather backstage to watch Chase perform. However, Chase's singing goes awry, and his performance is heavily criticized on social media. Following the performance, Cary comforts Chase, who is worried that he's upset his family. The season finale concludes with a series of unexpected revelations: Chase admits that he wants to quit his singing career to go to college, much to the dismay of Streeter, Cary, and Brooke; Streeter reveals that he wants to marry Pat; Pat is revealed to be the host of her own daytime talk show, The Pat Dubek Show.

=== Season 2 (2021) ===
No. overall	No. in season	Title	Directed by	Written by	Original release date
11	1	"Chase Goes to College"	Chris Kelly	Chris Kelly and Sarah Schneider	August 26, 2021
The season two premiere follows the Dubeks as they pursue new ventures: Pat's daytime talk show is wildly successful across the country; Cary is the host of numerous web-based talk shows, though he still longs for a career in acting; Brooke is trying to become a music manager, aiming to find the next ChaseDreams; Chase receives early acceptance to New York University, only to drop out due to unwanted attention from fans. Cary has begun dating Jess (Gideon Glick), while Brooke has an awkward reunion with Lance. Failing to recruit new talent online, Brooke realizes she does not have a future as a music manager and decides to become Pat's co-manager instead.
12	2	"Pat Connects with Her Fans"	Chris Kelly	Chris Kelly and Sarah Schneider	August 26, 2021
On The Pat Dubek Show, Pat interviews Eddie, a young gay man who has recently come out to his older conservative father, Troy. Touched by the story, Cary and Jess decide to show Eddie and Troy around New York City. Unbeknownst to them, Eddie and Troy are actually a couple and had contrived the father/son story in order to receive payment from appearing on Pat's show. Chase relaunches his singing career with a new video on YouTube, in which he reveals he has dyed his hair blonde. Brooke deals with Cathy, an obsessive fan who desperately wants to meet Pat. When Brooke allows Cathy to meet Pat, she unintentionally begins a meet-and-greet outside the soundstage.
13	3	"Chase Guest-Edits Vogue"	Chris Kelly	Brandon Scott Jones	September 2, 2021
Streeter hires Brooke to join Chase's management team. When Chase becomes the guest editor of the new issue of Vogue, Shuli assigns Brooke to accompany Chase at an exclusive Vogue party. Brooke is excited to attend, but she realizes the struggles of being a manager when she is forced to miss the party for a company call. Unable to pay rent, Cary begins making money through personalized fan videos on Cameo. Embarrassed, Cary does not reveal his new gig to Jess, who suspects that Cary is cheating. Cary apologizes to Jess for lying to him, and the two have an intimate discussion about their relationship. To Cary's shock, Jess tearfully admits Cary is his entire world and "the most important person in my life."
14	4	"Pat Hosts Just Another Regular Show"	Chris Kelly	Chris Kelly and Sarah Schneider	September 2, 2021
Following Jess's speech, Cary has become increasingly uncomfortable about their relationship. After running into Cameron Colby, a former Instagay, Cary and Jess decide to visit Cameron's home. They meet Cameron's husband, and Cary becomes horrified at the thought of marrying Jess. Cary ends up confronting Jess, revealing that he misses the casual single life, and expresses his fears that he and Jess are incompatible. The two ultimately decide to break up. Meanwhile, Brooke gets a new apartment and attempts to venture back into the dating life by asking out the male guests on Pat's show. After three disastrous dates, a depressed and lonely Brooke briefly considers reconnecting with Lance.
15	5	"Chase Gets Baptized"	Kim Nguyen	Chris Kelly and Sarah Schneider	September 9, 2021
Brooke, Cary, and Streeter attend Chase's baptism at ChristSong, an exclusive celebrity church. Longing for a vacation, Brooke gets baptized in order to befriend a group of church members going on a Mykonos trip; Streeter gets baptized after becoming jealous of a pastor who takes Chase under his wing; Cary gets baptized in order to get closer to a famous producer attending the church. The producer offers Cary a substantial television role on a Riverdale spin-off, but Cary questions accepting the role when he discovers the church upholds homophobic and misogynistic beliefs. Upon being informed of the church's controversial views, Chase angrily confronts the church members and publicly departs from the church in a speech that goes viral online.
16	6	"Pat Becomes #1 In Daytime"	Sarah Schneider	Gilli Nissim and Jack Scacco	September 9, 2021
Chase gets sued by ChristSong; Shuli congratulates Brooke for the publicity and nominates her for Variety's 30 Under 30, a list of well-known celebrities and creative directors. When Brooke and Chase make Variety's list, Brooke is invited to an uneventful 30 Under 30 gala for the creative directors, whereas Chase (and the other 30 Under 30 celebrities) are invited to an exclusive Brooklyn Nets game. Brooke also discovers that Lance, who has become a well-known shoe designer, is attending the gala. Lance cheers Brooke up and celebrates her birthday with a small dinner. Cary attempts to rebrand himself as a writer in order to land Mackenzie, a high-profile acting agent. After promising to e-mail Mackenzie an original screenplay, an overwhelmed Cary merely sends a title page; Mackenzie does not open the document and signs Cary on as a client.
17	7	"Chase Becomes Co-Owner of the Nets"	Kim Nguyen	Chris Kelly & Sarah Schneider	September 16, 2021
Brooke is invited to be a guest on a women's panel, but she quickly finds herself in over her head; she fails to answer the panel moderator's questions and is also called out by a hostile audience member whom she had unfollowed on Instagram. When Brooke gives a speech to defend herself against the audience member, she ends up winning the respect of the audience as well as the other panelists. Cary lands a role in Night Nurse, a small indie movie, but loses the role when the movie's funding is pulled. Cary confides his frustrations to his friend Curtis, who assures Cary that "things are happening for you." Pat later creates a new Instagram post and tags Cary's account, which quickly boosts Cary's social media profile.
18	8	"Pat Gets an Offer to Host “Tic Tac Toe”"	Mike Karnell	John Riggi	September 16, 2021
Following new-found Instagram fame, Cary is approached by Dean Brennon, a famous Hollywood actor who expresses romantic interest. Cary goes on a date with Dean, but Shuli secretly warns Cary that Dean is straight and is "gay-baiting" Cary for the paparazzi. Upon being confronted by Cary, Dean admits his heterosexuality, spurring Cary to end the relationship. Meanwhile, Chase gets hired as a voice actor for a movie starring athlete Damien Davis. Brooke ends up having sex with Damien, who asks her to sign a non-disclosure agreement; Brooke breaks the NDA when she obliviously reveals the news to three Lyft drivers. In order to pay for her expenses, Brooke gets Pat to become the host of a new NBC game show. This further dismays Streeter, who is struggling with Pat's hectic work schedule.
19	9	"Chase & Pat Are Killing It"	Kim Nguyen	Chris Kelly & Sarah Schneider	September 23, 2021
Brooke and Cary fly on Skypoint Airlines to watch Chase and Lance's fashion show in Los Angeles. During the flight, Cary sends an explicit nude photo of himself on Grindr; he is unaware that the nude picture is a live photo that reveals his face, and the nude gets leaked on social media. At an exclusive hotel, Brooke runs into pop singer Alessia Cara, who expresses interest in having Brooke become her manager; Brooke agrees to meet with Alessia the following Monday. Brooke celebrates with Lance while his girlfriend Leah is out of town. The two get drunk and, after reflecting on their relationship, masturbate to each other. Meanwhile, Skypoint Airlines releases an apology condemning Cary's actions; their apology is labelled homophobic on Twitter, and Cary ends up gaining supporters online, including numerous A-list celebrities. Due to his new Twitter popularity, Cary's cancelled film, Night Nurse, gets the green-light once again.
20	10	"Brooke & Cary Go to a Fashion Show"	Charlie Gruet	Chris Kelly & Sarah Schneider	September 23, 2021
The season finale mainly focuses on Pat and Chase, as they prepare for the upcoming fashion show: Chase has grown increasingly frustrated about how Brooke is managing his career, but he is unable to express his feelings to his family, while Pat's hectic work schedule is taking a toll on her health. Brooke ends her relationship with Lance, unaware that Lance had broken up with Leah. At the fashion show, an exhausted Pat passes out on the runway from dehydration. The family visits Pat in the hospital, culminating in numerous confrontations: Chase angrily vents his frustrations at Brooke and Cary for ignoring him and being unavailable; Streeter blames Brooke for overloading Pat with work; Pat reveals that she feels exhausted by Streeter's clingy personality. Coming to the realization that Pat needs to spend time with her family, Streeter organizes a beach vacation for the Dubeks. This pleases Pat and Chase but worries Brooke and Cary, who are forced to choose between their family and their careers. The episode ends with Pat, Brooke, Chase, and Streeter enjoying their beach vacation, while Cary stays in New York City to film his movie; it is revealed that Cary's table read takes place on March 13, 2020, the day COVID-19 is declared a national emergency in the United States.

=== Season 3 (2023) ===
No. overall	No. in season	Title	Directed by	Written by	Original release date
21	1	"Cary Watches People Watch His Movie"	Chris Kelly	Chris Kelly & Sarah Schneider	May 4, 2023
Cary's movie Night Nurse is finally set for a streaming release after multiple production delays due to the COVID-19 pandemic. Chase deals with being treated differently in the public eye after turning eighteen; Chase also worries that Streeter will drop him as a client after his sophomore album was a commercial failure, having been released on the day of the insurrection. Brooke and Lance have gotten engaged; Lance now works as a nurse, having quit his job as a fashion designer, while Brooke feels insecure over having stayed in the entertainment industry during the pandemic. After the success of her talk show, Pat is now the head of her own television network. Cary anticipates the Night Nurse movie premiere, but the event is abruptly cancelled; Pat agrees to host a small watchparty of the movie with family and friends at her mansion. Night Nurse ultimately receives glowing reviews from critics and audiences.
22	2	"Brooke Drives an Armpit Across America"	Chris Kelly	Chris Kelly & Sarah Schneider	May 4, 2023
Following the positive reception to Night Nurse, Cary tries to advance his career by hiring a publicist, to no avail. While walking around New York City, Cary is approached by a man named Nicholas, who asks him out on a date. Cary and Nicholas bond, but Cary later discovers from Curtis that Nicholas is actually a gay actor named Lucas Lambert Moy, who is starring in a Love, Victor spinoff called Love, Nicholas; Cary learns that Lucas is notorious for his method acting, staying in-character 24/7 whenever he books a role. Pat wishes to take a stroll around Central Park, but is unable to leave her house without her security detail. Chase is involved in an $8 million photoshoot with Rolling Stone, and Shuli assigns Brooke and Streeter to drive across the country to privately deliver the pictures to the Rolling Stone headquarters. After completing the week-long trip, Brooke rants to Streeter over the absurdity of their jobs. Continuing to feel unfulfilled as a manager, Brooke quits her job and reveals the news to Lance.
23	3	"Cary Becomes Somewhat of a Name"	Chris Kelly	Allison Silverman	May 11, 2023
After quitting her job, Brooke faces life as an ordinary person, but quickly finds herself missing the perks of her old job. When Chase is invited to Ellen DeGeneres's birthday party, Brooke offers to accompany Chase, but Shuli chooses Streeter instead. Brooke ends up sneaking into the party herself, but finds herself ostracized by the rest of the partygoers, as she is no longer a member of the industry. Cary and Lucas have started dating, though Lucas has booked a role in a new Christmas movie, and is now playing in-character as a closeted teen. Cary and Curtis audition for a Paramount+ sitcom pilot for a stereotypical gay best friend role. The producers are impressed with Cary's audition, but Cary later discovers that the producers have chosen Curtis for the role. Cary is clearly unhappy over Curtis landing the role, causing a rift in their friendship.
24	4	"Brooke Gets Her Hands Dirty"	Sarah Schneider	Chris Kelly & Sarah Schneider	May 18, 2023 (Note: This episode was first released on Crave on May 11, 2023.)
Cary books a three-episode arc in Emily Overruled, a scripted legal procedural show, but feels unfulfilled by the boring nature of the set. Cary attempts to bring life into the set by encouraging his co-stars to improvise, pleasing the actors but irritating the set crew. Meanwhile, Brooke wants to make an effort to do good, and she and Cameron Colby create Impact Group, a nonsensical charity intended to "make an impact but also have fun." They schedule a meeting with a group of investors to discuss the charity, but Cameron abandons Brooke during the meeting. Brooke reluctantly joins a nonprofit group dedicated to planting trees in the Bronx. Pat dresses up as an old woman in prosthetic makeup in order to leave her house without her security detail. While in prosthetics, Pat comes across Streeter at a bar and overhears him confiding to a bartender over how he can't live life as a normal person while dating Pat; Pat leaves the bar in tears.
25	5	"Cary & Brooke Go to an AIDS Play"	Chris Kelly	Chris Kelly & Sarah Schneider	May 25, 2023 (Note: This episode was first released on Crave on May 18, 2023.)
Pat and Streeter decide to break up. Cary is frustrated in his relationship with Lucas, who continues to practice his method acting. Cary learns that Lucas is up for a role as a gay porn star in an Adam McKay film, but Lukas Gage ends up getting the role instead; Cary tries to threaten Lukas into giving up the role. Cary contemplates breaking up with Lucas, but ultimately decides to stay in the relationship when Lucas gets nominated for a Tony Award. Chase has gotten engaged to actress Kiernan Shipka, but Brooke discovers that Chase is secretly pursuing a relationship with another girl named Pam; Brooke and Shuli begin damage control to prevent Chase and Pam's relationship from going public. When Lance learns of Brooke's involvement, Brooke admits that she liked being a manager and blames Lance for judging her. Lance defends himself, stating that he's been supportive throughout her struggles, and calls Brooke out for her self-absorbed behavior. When Lance implies that they should break off the engagement, Brooke storms out and stays with Streeter overnight.
26	6	"Brooke, and We Are Not Joking, Goes to Space"	Charlie Gruet	Gilli Nissim	May 31, 2023 (Note: This episode was released on Wednesday, unlike other episodes from the season which were released on Thursdays.) (Note: This episode was first released on Crave on May 25, 2023.)
Recovering from her break-up with Lance, Brooke feels that she is ready to start dating again. Shuli sets up Brooke with a rich billionaire, but Brooke finds him too self-obsessed and competitive. Brooke comes to realize that she can use her power and money as a manager to do good within the industry. Pat has begun dating actor Simu Liu. Cary is offered a role in a new Disney movie to voice Globby, who is being marketed as Disney's first openly queer character. Despite the publicity surrounding Globby's character, Cary discovers that Globby's queerness is extremely vague and minimal within the context of the film, but decides to accept the role anyway. At Cary's insistence, Curtis and his friends reluctantly decide to attend the movie's premiere. During the screening of the movie, the "exclusively gay moment" featuring Globby receives backlash from the audience for not being an accurate representation of the LGBTQ+ community; Cary tries to claim that Disney cut out more scenes featuring Globby.
27	7	"Cary Gets His Ass Handed to Him"	Charlie Gruet	Chris Kelly & Sarah Schneider	June 8, 2023
Cary finishes post-production work for a new fantasy show called Windweaver, although he believes it will receive negative reviews. He is also dismayed to learn that Curtis's new sitcom Girlies is 100% fresh on Rotten Tomatoes. When Curtis arranges a watchparty, Cary initially declines to attend, but decides to show up when Girlies starts to receive horrible reviews from critics. Curtis correctly deduces that Cary only showed up upon learning that the show was a failure and kicks him out of the house. Chase and Pam break up despite having already made their relationship public, forcing Brooke to try to keep Chase's fans from bullying Pam. Pat reveals that she wants to have a normal family dinner at Applebee's for her birthday. Simu Liu arranges a family dinner for the Dubeks at a fake Applebee's built on a soundstage, although Pat does not know of the truth. Upon realizing that the Applebee's is a sham, Pat breaks down to her family over the fact that she cannot live a normal life. After Pat leaves, Cary is surprised to learn that Windweaver is receiving positive reviews.
28	8	"Brooke Hosts a Night of Undeniable Good"	Chris Kelly	Chris Kelly & Sarah Schneider	June 15, 2023
After learning that he has been upgraded to a series regular on Windweaver, Cary decides to attend his high school reunion in Ohio to show off his success. Cary’s former classmates are happy to see Cary and they have a good time, but Cary immediately feels unhappy and depressed after the reunion is over. While driving back to New York, Cary sets a new goal: winning the Academy Award for Best Actor. Brooke and Shuli decide to make Chase the face of mental health, and Brooke continues trying to do good by organizing a mental health telethon. The telethon turns awry when the scheduled guests, Ben Platt and Cameron Kasky, both test positive for COVID-19. Meanwhile, Chase tweets that he'll give a free month of therapy for anyone who bought his album; Chase's album rises to number one on iTunes. Brooke is horrified to learn that Lance has been named People Magazine's Sexiest Man Alive. Pat spends the weekend in Ohio to reunite with her old friends. Although it seems that Pat is enjoying her vacation, Pat later reveals that she hated the experience and found it boring. She intends to text her frustrations to Streeter, but accidentally tweets it instead.
29	9	"Cary Pays Off His Student Loans"	Sarah Schneider	Chris Kelly & Sarah Schneider	June 22, 2023
Wanting to win an Academy Award, Cary schedules a meeting with Mackenzie and expresses interest in playing Albert Einstein for an upcoming movie entitled One Night with Albert. With the help of Shuli, Cary is able to convince the movie producers to let him audition for the lead role, and Cary gets a reluctant Pat to finance the movie. In an attempt to generate Oscar buzz, Mackenzie secures Cary a New York Times feature that profiles his life. When the New York Times writer wishes to meet with Cary's friends, Cary realizes that he does not have any. Brooke is determined to prove that Lance hired a publicist for his People Magazine appearance. She breaks into Lance's apartment in prosthetics to check his emails, but finds no evidence. While trying to quietly leave the apartment, Brooke unintentionally starts a fire; Lance manages to safely evacuate everybody inside the apartment. Brooke is overjoyed to learn that Chase's mental health telethon has received a Peabody Award. In Ohio, Pat bonds with her friend's kids. Realizing she needs to salvage her relationship with her own kids, Pat reveals to Streeter that she intends to fire Brooke as her manager and pull the funding for Cary's movie.
30	10	"Brooke & Cary & Curtis & Lance"	Chris Kelly	Chris Kelly & Sarah Schneider	June 29, 2023
Cary's mental health starts to deteriorate as he grows obsessive over winning an Academy Award. Angered that Mackenzie is not answering his calls, Cary tracks down Mackenzie in the Hamptons and shows up outside her door to demand an audience. Mackenzie lambasts Cary for his behavior, snapping Cary back to reality. Upon realizing how his actions have affected others, Cary breaks down. After staying overnight at Mackenzie's place, Cary calls Pat and informs her that she doesn't need to fund the movie, as he plans to leave the project altogether. Cary also sees a news story about Lucas, who has been found walking naked down the road in a confused and disoriented state; it is revealed that Lucas is actually married. Cary tries to make amends with Curtis, who is celebrating his birthday at a beach house in the Hamptons. Curtis forgives Cary and the two mend their friendship. While walking the beach alone, Cary receives a call from Mackenzie, informing him that a director has been attached to the movie; Cary abruptly hangs up, uninterested. Brooke anticipates the Peabody Awards ceremony, but things go wrong when Pat and Chase receive massive backlash online; Chase, for exploiting people struggling with mental health for album sales, and Pat, for her since-deleted tweets about Ohio. Brooke unexpectedly decides to take the fall for Pat and Chase, publicly claiming that she was the one responsible for the tweets, and releasing a statement from Pat and Chase's respective Twitter accounts firing Brooke as their manager. After the ceremony, Brooke reunites with Lance, and they reflect on their relationship; Lance commends Brooke for helping her family, and reveals that he did hire a publicist for People Magazine. The two rekindle their relationship, sharing a passionate kiss in the rain. In a post-credits scene, Brooke discovers from Streeter that numerous celebrities want her to represent them, as she had taken the fall for her own clients.

== Production ==
=== Development ===
Season 1 promotional poster

A few months prior to being named co-head writers for Saturday Night Live's 42nd season, Chris Kelly and Sarah Schneider spent a week in early 2016 developing the premise of The Other Two. They wanted the show to depict the introspection and self-doubt that twenty-somethings face, while incorporating elements of pop culture. Kelly said they wanted to include depictions of the characters' sex lives. Speaking to Vulture, Schneider said they intentionally wrote the character of Chase to be kind and innocent because it would subvert expectations of the story.

The pilot was sold to Comedy Central in late 2016. Schneider and Kelly hired Charlie Gruet, who was the director of photography of the television series High Maintenance. In October 2017, The Other Two received a full series order. The series was produced through executive producer Lorne Michaels' entertainment studio, Broadway Video. The first season began streaming on HBO Max in 2021, where the second season streams exclusively, making the series a "Max Original". The second season premiered on August 26, 2021, on HBO Max with a two-episode release. On September 24, 2021, HBO Max renewed the series for a third season. In an article by The Hollywood Reporter in June 2023, it was confirmed that the series would be ending with the third season.

=== Casting ===
In October 2017, it was announced that Drew Tarver, Heléne Yorke, Case Walker, Ken Marino, and Molly Shannon had joined the cast. Kelly and Schneider discovered Walker on social media: Walker was popular on the platform Musical.ly and had over 400,000 followers on Instagram. Tarver was brought in based on his comedic work at Upright Citizens Brigade Theatre, while Yorke was cast after Kelly and Schneider had seen her work on High Maintenance. It was announced in February 2020 that Gideon Glick would have a recurring role in the second season as Cary's new love interest, Jess. Shannon was promoted to the main cast in season two.

=== Filming ===
Filming for the second season initially began in early 2020 but abruptly halted in March due to the COVID-19 pandemic. Filming for the second season resumed on February 22, 2021, in New York and Los Angeles and concluded on May 9.

=== Complaints against Kelly and Schneider ===
The show's creators Chris Kelly and Sarah Schneider were reportedly the subject of complaints to human resources over their behavior on set and in the writers' room. The allegations, which became known to the public just before the series finale in June 2023, include Kelly verbally abusing writers and overworking the crew and claims that Schneider enabled his behavior. A formal investigation was conducted during which Kelly and Schneider were not allowed to be on set for a period, although they were formally cleared of wrongdoing and allowed to return. The toxic workplace environment was reported to have been an "open secret," with Tina Fey joking at an awards ceremony, "Nobody indulges writers like Lorne Michaels. Lorne, you have unleashed an army of monsters into the world. You know it, I know it, and the crew of The Other Two knows it."

== Reception ==
The Other Two was met with critical acclaim with its third season being the most acclaimed. The series has an overall approval rating of 97% based on 77 reviews on the review aggregation website Rotten Tomatoes. Metacritic assigned the series a weighted average score of 81 out of 100 based on 35 critic reviews, indicating "universal acclaim".

The first season has an approval rating of 94% based on 36 reviews, with an average rating of 8.52 out of 10, on the review aggregation website Rotten Tomatoes. The website's critical consensus reads: "With game leads and a wickedly witty sense of humor, The Other Two skewers and celebrates pop culture with equal aplomb." Metacritic assigned the series a weighted average score of 79 out of 100 based on 16 critics, indicating "generally favorable reviews".

The second season has an approval rating of 96% based on 24 reviews, with an average rating of 8.50 out of 10, on the review aggregation website Rotten Tomatoes. The website's critical consensus reads: "More mature, but still hilarious, The Other Two's superb second season solidifies its place as one of TVs best comedies."

The third season has an approval rating of 100% based on 24 reviews on the review aggregation website Rotten Tomatoes. The website's critical consensus reads: "The elder Dubek siblings may still feel like they're also-rans, but The Other Two remains cream of the crop in a third season that turns foiled dreams into delightful comedy."

== Accolades ==
Year	Award	Category	Nominee(s)	Result	Ref.
2019	International Online Cinema Awards	Best New Series	The Other Two	Won	
2019	International Online Cinema Awards	Program of the Year	The Other Two	Nominated	
2019	International Online Cinema Awards	Best Comedy Series	The Other Two	Nominated	
2019	International Online Cinema Awards	Best Actor in a Comedy Series	Drew Tarver	Nominated	
2019	International Online Cinema Awards	Best Supporting Actress in a Comedy Series	Molly Shannon	Nominated	
2019	International Online Cinema Awards	Best Writing for a Comedy Series	Chris Kelly & Sarah Schneider (for "Chase Gets the Gays")	Nominated	
2019	Television Critics Association Awards	Outstanding New Program	The Other Two	Nominated	
2020	Critics' Choice Television Awards	Best Supporting Actress in a Comedy Series	Molly Shannon	Nominated	
2020	Dorian Awards	Unsung TV Show of the Year	The Other Two	Won	
2020	Dorian Awards	TV Comedy of the Year	The Other Two	Nominated	
2020	Dorian Awards	LGBTQ TV Show of the Year	The Other Two	Nominated	
2020	GLAAD Media Awards	Outstanding Comedy Series	The Other Two	Nominated	
2022	International Online Cinema Awards	Best Comedy Series	The Other Two	Nominated	
2022	International Online Cinema Awards	Best Actress in a Comedy Series	Heléne Yorke	Nominated	
2022	International Online Cinema Awards	Best Supporting Actress in a Comedy Series	Molly Shannon	Nominated	
2022	Critics' Choice Television Awards	Best Comedy Series	The Other Two	Nominated	
2022	Critics' Choice Television Awards	Best Supporting Actress in a Comedy Series	Molly Shannon	Nominated	
2023	GLAAD Media Awards	Outstanding Comedy Series	The Other Two	Nominated	
2023	Casting Society of America Awards	Outstanding Achievement in Casting - Television Series - Comedy	Allison Estrin, Henry Russell Bergstein, Jenn Gaw (associate) Dayna Katz (associate)	Nominated	
2023	International Online Cinema Awards	Best Comedy Series	The Other Two	Nominated	
2023	International Online Cinema Awards	Best Comedy Series	The Other Two	Nominated	
2023	International Online Cinema Awards	Best Actor in a Comedy Series	Drew Tarver	Nominated	
2023	International Online Cinema Awards	Best Actress in a Comedy Series	Heléne Yorke	Nominated	
2023	International Online Cinema Awards	Best Supporting Actress in a Comedy Series	Molly Shannon	Nominated	
2023	International Online Cinema Awards	Best Writing for a Comedy Series	Chris Kelly and Sarah Schneider (for "Cary & Brooke Go to an AIDS Play")	Nominated	
2023	International Online Cinema Awards	Best Ensemble in a Comedy Series	Brandon Scott Jones, Ken Marino, Josh Segarra, Molly Shannon, Drew Tarver, Case Walker, Heléne Yorke	Nominated	
2023	Television Critics Association Awards	Program of the Year	The Other Two	Nominated	
2023	Television Critics Association Awards	Outstanding Achievement in Comedy	The Other Two	Nominated	
2023	Critics' Choice Television Awards	Best Actor in a Comedy Series	Drew Tarver	Nominated	
2023	Primetime Emmy Awards	Outstanding Writing for a Comedy Series	Chris Kelly & Sarah Schneider (for "Cary & Brooke Go to an AIDS Play")	Nominated	
2024	Primetime Emmy Awards	Outstanding Writing for a Comedy Series	Chris Kelly & Sarah Schneider (for "Brooke Hosts a Night of Undeniable Good")	Nominated	
