= Monster High 2 =

Sequel to Monster High: The Movie

- Official release poster
- Genre: Musical; Fantasy
- Based on: The Monster High fashion doll line by Mattel
- Written by: Todd Holland; Matt Eddy; Billy Eddy
- Directed by: Todd Holland
- Starring: Miia Harris; Ceci Balagot; Nayah Damasen
- Music by: Sunna Wehrmeijer
- Countries of origin: Canada; United States
- Original language: English

Production
- Executive producers: Todd Holland; Adam Bonnett; Frederic "Fred" Soulie; Philip "Phil" Breman; Shawn Williamson
- Producers: David Magee; Emanuel Pereira
- Running time: 93 minutes
- Production companies: Nickelodeon Movies; Mattel Television; Brightlight Pictures

Original release
- Network: Nickelodeon; Paramount+
- Release: October 5, 2023

Related
- Monster High: The Movie (2022)

Monster High 2 is a 2023 musical fantasy comedy television film and a sequel to Monster High: The Movie directed by Todd Holland (written by Todd Holland, Matt Eddy and Billy Eddy) released on both Paramount+ and Nickelodeon, in the United States, on October 5, 2023.

Based on the eponymous fashion doll franchise by Mattel and produced by its television division and Brightlight Pictures, the film stars Miia Harris, Ceci Balagot and Nayah Damasen as Clawdeen Wolf, Frankie Stein and Draculaura. Respectively along with Case Walker, Steve Valentine, Jy Prishkulnik, Lina Lecompte, Justin Derickson, Marci T. House, Scotch Ellis Loring, Nasiv Sall and Lilah Fitzgerald and newcomers including Ana Ortiz, Bonale Fambrini, Kyra Leroux and Salena Qureshi.

== Plot ==
Clawdeen Wolf is now a famous monster for saving Monster High from Edward "Eddy" Hyde Jr. (Note: As seen in Monster High: The Movie.) She arrives at Draculaura's back to school party with Frankie Stein, and is unhappy about the fame. Her boyfriend Deuce Gorgon tells her that's what popularity is like. On the first day back, everybody is hanging out when the werecat Toralei Stripe makes an entrance after studying abroad in Scaris, France for a year. She opposes both half-monsters and witchcraft at the school, showing her scars on her right arm from witches who'd attacked her in Scaris. Clawdeen stands up to Toralei, but she smirks and leaves.

Clawdeen, Draculaura and Frankie are outside the school when a group of monsters led by Demi Boovais approach Clawdeen. Demi tells her she is also half-monster and Clawdeen is why she came to Monster High. As Draculaura and Frankie walk to class, another new student bumps into Draculaura. He introduces himself as Ellis Ghould, another vampire like her. They seem to be mutually interested. Later, while Clawdeen and Deuce are hanging out, he tells her about how his mother is making him do a traditional year- long gorgon retreat, since Medusa despises Monster High.

At assembly, the school welcomes the new students, and Headmistress Bloodgood announces that Clawdeen and Toralei are the two candidates running for prefect. Clawdeen wants the post to follow in her mother Selena's footsteps and wants to ensure that witchcraft and half-humans will continue to be allowed at Monster High. Later that night, Draculaura is practicing magic in the courtyard when Ellis sees her and tells her not to hide it. He also practices witchcraft which is why he came to the school, so they bond over being the only vampires there who practice it. Later, Clawdeen is alone with Frankie and tells her about her stress from Cleo De Nile barraging her with questions on running for prefect, when witches suddenly appear in the room as Draculaura arrives. She scares them away with her super werewolf roar.

After, in Bloodgood's office, Clawdeen, Frankie and Draculaura tell her what happened in their room. Toralei and her friends arrive and tell her they must have come because Draculaura attracted the witches. Clawdeen and her friends confront Toralei to clarify that Draculaura is innocent, but Bloodgood announces she is putting a school-wide ban on all witchcraft. Ellis reveals himself as a human to Draculaura and convinces her to go with him to meet his mother Zamara Prue, head of the Salem witch coven, to possibly help end the centuries-old feud between them and vampires. As she left a far-from-perfect body double behind, Clawdeen, although jeopardizing the prefect elections, goes to find her in Seattle on a hunch. Heath Burns, Deuce, and Frankie show up to help her bring her back.

Draculaura meets Zamara, the head of the coven, who convinces her to speak at the huge witch conclave the next day. Meanwhile, Apollo Wolf, whose security company is in charge of the company's security, manages to guide Clawdeen to Draculaura. They talk, but she won't leave as she believes she must fight for peace. Clawdeen and her friends return to Monster High without Draculaura in time for the closing speeches for prefect. Where Toralei spews hate speech, she calls for inclusion. After Draculaura sees Clawdeen's speech in Seattle, she prepares to head back. However, Zamara appears and explains that Draculaura is her prisoner. As she comes to age at midnight, they are going to use her to cast a mortality curse, destroying all vampires at midnight. Draculaura is kept in a monster-repulsing cage and put under a spell to chant the curse nonstop, with the only way to snap out of it is if someone touches her.

Discovering Zamara's plan, Clawdeen, her friends, and Toralei rescue Draculaura in Seattle. Deuce, Heath and Toralei create diversions while Frankie helps short-circuit the entrance doors. Zamara arrives to thwart the rescue, but Ellis disillusioned with his mother for manipulating him, helps hold her off so Clawdeen can free Draculaura. Clawdeen risks her life to save Draculaura, bending the cage's bars to reach her and touch her, breaking the spell. Losing consciousness, she faces the Grim Reaper but refuses to concede. Clawdeen comes to, having been revived by Frankie and discovering that Draculaura cleaned house. Her father comes, congratulates her, and takes care of the prisoners. Ellis and Draculaura make peace, and she heads back to school.

Back at Monster High, the friends celebrate Draculaura's birthday, then they see that Clawdeen has been elected prefect, fully earning Toralei's respect while bonding over shared witch scars. Deuce takes a year off to find himself, and he and Clawdeen share their first kiss. Deuce leaves Monster High only to be snatched by the Grim Reaper. He heads towards Monster High stating "The dead must rest. And I will not be cheated again." Frankie then wakes up.

== Cast ==
- Miia Harris as Clawdeen Wolf, the daughter of Apollo and Selena, best friend to Frankie and Draculaura, and Deuce's girlfriend. She is half-werewolf and half-human, and has since become a famous monster due to her defeating Mr. Komos and helping allow humans at Monster High.
- Ceci Balagot as Frankie Stein, the child of Frankenstein's monster, creation of Dr. and Dr. Stein and best friend to Clawdeen and Draculaura. After getting new upgrades a day ago, they are learning to readjust to their new powers.
- Nayah Damasen as Draculaura, the daughter of Count Dracula and friend of Frankie Stein and Clawdeen Wolf. Though she is allowed to practice witchcraft, she feels the burden of her family name weighing her down.
- Case Walker as Deuce Gorgon, the son of Medusa and Lyra, Heath's best friend and Clawdeen's boyfriend. Due to not fully being able to use his powers, despite using them throughout the movie, he decides to partake in a traditional gorgon retreat that lasts for a year.
- Jy Prishkulnik as Cleo de Nile, the daughter of a mummy, Lagoona's best friend, and Monster High's resident Queen Bee who helps Clawdeen in winning prefect against Toralei.
- Salena Qureshi as Toralei Stripe, the daughter of two werecats, who returns to Monster High after a year abroad in Scaris, France. She is manipulative and antagonistic, wanting Clawdeen to leave Monster High due to her human blood, but is later revealed to be trustworthy after helping to save Draculaura from the Salem Coven.
- Steve Valentine as Count Dracula, Draculaura's father, a friend of Bloodgood, and a member of Monster High Council. Dracula continues to pressure Draculaura and not listen to what she wants instead of what he wants for her.
- Marci T. House as Headless Headmistress Bloodgood, the Headless horsewoman who is Monster High's tough-but-fair headmistress and a stickler for following the rules.
- Scotch Ellis Loring as Apollo Wolf, Clawdeen's father who aids his daughter when looking for Draculaura.
- Justin Derickson as Heath Burns, son of the Fire Elementals and Deuce's best friend. He taps into his elements when helping to save Draculaura.
- Lina Lecompte as Lagoona Blue, the daughter of an unidentified sea monster and a sea nymph. She is Cleo's best friend.
- Kyra Leroux as Demi Boovais, a ghost/human hybrid who idolizes Clawdeen.
- Lilah Fitzgerald as Ghoulia Yelps, the daughter of the zombies.
- Nasiv Sall as Abbey Bominable, the daughter of the Yetis.
- Ana Ortiz as Zamara Prue, the leader of Coleman's Eve. Zamara is incredibly trustworthy and tells Draculaura she can help end the war between witches and vampires. However, she is revealed to be a witch who is the leader of the Salem Coven looking to wipe out all vampires. Zamara was previously and partially performed by Artemis Pebdani at the end of the previous film.
- Bonale Fambrini as Ellis Ghould, the son of Zamara and Draculaura's love interest. Ellis is a new vampire/witch student that transferred to Monster High. He is later revealed to be a human witch who opened a portal to allow the witches to enter Monster High.
- Steven Huy as a Teenage Monster, the monster teenager who idolizes Clawdeen.
- Matt Kennedy and Katie Stuart as Hipsters
- Alistair Abell and Scott Patey as Zamara Prue's henchmen
- Kyle Strauts as the Grim Reaper
- Kyle Selig as Mr. Komos/Edward "Eddy" Hyde Jr., the son of Edward "Eddy" Hyde Sr. who got turned into stone by Clawdeen using Cleo's phone in the first film. He appears in archive footage with his petrified state is still on Monster High property.

=== Voices ===
- Michael Antonakos as Coleman Eves
- Natasha Leggero as Skullette, the school's PA system.
- Owen Thomas as the Grim Reaper

== Production ==
=== Development ===
On October 25, 2022, Mattel and Nickelodeon announced the greenlighting of a sequel to Monster High: The Movie after claiming spot as the No. 1 kids and family film/movie on Paramount+ during its launch week and reached more than 4 million total viewers across its premiere weekend on Nickelodeon and its sister channels except Nick Jr. (Nick at Nite, Nicktoons and TeenNick). Todd Holland was set to return as director and executive producer, Fred Soulie, senior vice president and general manager of Mattel Television, Phil Breman, vice president of live-action development at Mattel and Adam Bonnett would also return as executive producers with the screenplay being written by Matt & Billy Eddy, with story by Todd Holland & Matt Eddy & Billy Eddy.

=== Promotion ===
On March 4, 2023, Miia Harris, Ceci Balagot, Nayah Damasen and Case Walker appeared at the Kids' Choice Awards to promote the film with its sneak peek and teaser.

On September 15, 2023, the full-length trailer for Monster High 2 was uploaded to Paramount+'s official YouTube channel.

=== Release ===
The film was simultaneously released on Paramount+ and Nickelodeon on October 5, 2023.

== Soundtrack ==
Monster High 2 (Original Motion Picture Soundtrack)

Soundtrack album by Monster High
- Released: October 5, 2023
- Genre: Soundtrack
- Length: 27:16
- Label: Arts Music

The film's soundtrack was released undisclosed to music streaming services on 20 September 2023.

No.	Title	Artist(s)	Length
1.	"My Heart Goes Boom Boom Boom"	Miia Harris; Nayah Damasen; Ceci Balagot; Lina Lecompte; Lilah Fitzgerald; Case Walker; Jy Prishkulnik; Justin Derickson; Nasiv Sall	2:47
2.	"One Moon, One Heart"	Miia Harris; Nayah Damasen; Ceci Balagot	2:44
3.	"Make Your Own Way"	Tina Parol; Oh, Hush!	2:04
4.	"Reason We've Got Magic"	Nayah Damasen; Bonale Fambrini	1:33
5.	"You Don't Know"	Miia Harris; Salena Qureshi	2:39
6.	"Reason We've Got Magic (Reprise)"	Nayah Damasen	0:48
7.	"Not How Our Story Goes"	Miia Harris; Nayah Damasen; Ceci Balagot	3:06
8.	"Together Forever"	FJØRA	2:37
9.	"Gotta Get There Together"	Miia Harris; Nayah Damasen; Ceci Balagot	3:26
10.	"Monsters Are"	Miia Harris; Nayah Damasen; Ceci Balagot; Case Walker; Jy Prishkulnik; Justin Derickson; Salena Qureshi	2:46
11.	"Never Walk Alone"	Blue Sky Moon	2:41
Total length:			27:16

== Reception ==
Monster High 2 has a score of 73% on Rotten Tomatoes.

== Future ==
On June 5, 2024, Mattel and Universal Pictures announced they are developing a live-action Monster High film (with a new cast, and which will not be a musical) unrelated to Monster High 2 and its prequel.
