= Steve Valentine =

British actor (born 1966)

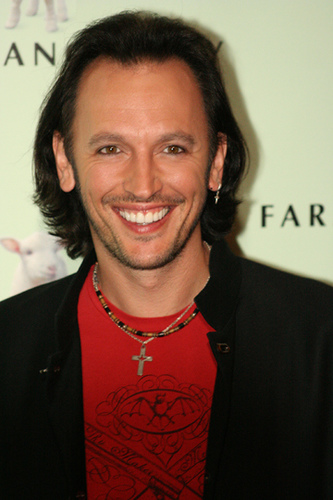
- Valentine in July 2006
- Born: Stephen John Valentine; 26 October 1966 (age 59); Glasgow, Scotland
- Citizenship: United Kingdom; United States
- Occupations: Actor; magician
- Years active: 1988–present

Stephen John Valentine (born 26 October 1966) is a British actor and magician. He is known for his roles as Nigel Townsend on NBC's crime drama series Crossing Jordan, the voice of Harry Flynn in the video game Uncharted 2: Among Thieves, and the voice of Alistair in the Dragon Age video game franchise. He portrayed Dracula in Monster High: The Movie and its sequel Monster High 2.

== Career ==
Valentine started his career as a magician; on the audio commentary for Spider-Man 3, actress Bryce Dallas Howard revealed that he performed magic at her seventh birthday party. Some of Valentine's characters have also been magicians.

He has been seen in films such as Mars Attacks!, Teen Beach Movie, and Avalon High. He was a main cast member on Crossing Jordan and has guest starred on such shows as House, Monk, Just Shoot Me, Will & Grace, Dharma & Greg, Psych, and Charmed. Valentine hosted Syfy's reality show Estate of Panic. He voiced Alistair in the Dragon Age: Origins video game franchise and Harry Flynn in the video game Uncharted 2: Among Thieves.

He starred as Derek Jupiter in the Disney XD sitcom I'm in the Band.

== Filmography ==
=== Television ===
Actor

Year	Title	Role	Notes
1995	Married... with Children	Guy in Line	Episode: "The Weaker Sex"
1996	Melrose Place	Reporter	Episode: "No Lifeguard on Duty"
1996–97	Night Stand with Dick Dietrick	The Astounding Andy	3 episodes
1997	Silk Stalkings	Nigel	Episode: "Fevers"
1997	Men Behaving Badly	Ash	Episode: "The Box"
1998	Martial Law	Nigel	Episode: "Funny Money"
1998	Diagnosis: Murder	Art Gallery Owner	Episode: "Obsession: Part 2"
1998	Promised Land	Andrew Petrie	Episode: "Purple Heart"
1999	Will & Grace	Kai	Episode: "I Never Promised You an Olive Garden"
1999	JAG	Professor Pilkington	Episode: "Psychic Warrior"
1999	G vs E	Desmond Rossmore	Episode: "Lady Evil"
1999	Don't Look Under the Bed	The Boogeyman	Television film
2000	Dharma & Greg	Roger	Episode: "Mad Secretaries and Englishmen"
2000	The Hughleys	Warren	Episode: "Scary Hughley"
2000	The Geena Davis Show	Walter	Episode: "Pilot"
2000	Beyond Belief: Fact or Fiction	Izzy Wilson	Episode: "Creepy Comics"
2000	Providence	The Mad Hatter	Episode: "Syd in Wonderland"
2000	V.I.P.	Faust	Episode: "Val Point Blank"
2000–01	Nikki	Martine	16 episodes
2001	FreakyLinks	Roger Spence	Episode: "Subject: The Final Word"
2001	Just Shoot Me!	Zigmund	Episode: "Mayas and Tigers and Deans, Oh My"
2001	Charmed	Eames	Episode: "Blinded by the Whitelighter"
2001–07	Crossing Jordan	Nigel Townsend	Main role, 117 episodes
2006	Boston Legal	Dan Rice	2 episodes
2006	Stacked	Tim	Episode: "The Day the Music Died"
2006	Criss Angel Mindfreak	Himself	
2007	House M.D.	Flynn	Episode: "You Don't Want to Know"
2008	Estate of Panic	Host/Himself	
2008	Ghost Hunters	Host/Himself	Episode: "Halloween 2008 Special"
2008	Chuck	Von Hayes	Episode: "Chuck Versus the Break-Up"
2009	Drop Dead Diva	PDQ Chief Designer Henri Malik	Episode: "The Dress"
2009	Monk	The Great Torini	Episode: "Mr. Monk and the Magician"
2009–11	I'm in the Band	Derek Jupiter	Main role, 36 episodes
2009	Wizards of Waverly Place: The Movie	Archie	Television film
2010	The Good Guys	Nigel	Episode: "Bait & Switch"
2010	Avalon High	Mr. Moore	Television film
2012	NCIS	Miles Wolf	Episode: "Recovery"
2012	Leverage	David Lampard	Episode: "The French Connection Job"
2012	Harry's Law	Tony Trafford	Episode: "Class War"
2012	Hot in Cleveland	Drago	Episode: "I'm With the Band"
2013	Supernatural	Chef Leo	Episode: "Dog Dean Afternoon"
2013	Warehouse 13	Val Preston	Episode: "The Sky's the Limit"
2013	Psych	Billy Lipps	Episode: "100 Clues"
2013	Anger Management	Dr. Lesley Moore	3 episodes
2013	Major Crimes	Peter Page (Defence Attorney)	Season 2, Episode 10
2013	Teen Beach Movie	Les Camembert	Television film
2014	Hot in Cleveland	Jay/Joy	Episode: "Playmates"
2014	Perception	Dr. Napoleon Messier	Episode: "Painless"
2014	CSI: Crime Scene Investigation	Gary Korlov	Episode: "Consumed"
2014	The Big Bang Theory	Kenneth	Episode: "The Gorilla Dissolution"
2015	Mike & Molly	Xander Van Xander	Episode: "Hack to the Future"
2015	Dog with a Blog	Ralph	Episode: "Cat with a Blog"
2015	Jake and the Never Land Pirates	The Remarkable Beardini	Voice only 4 episodes
2017	Supergirl	Meta-Doctor	Episode: "We Can Be Heroes"
2017–21	Mickey and the Roadster Racers / Mickey Mouse Mixed-Up Adventures	Commander Heist	Recurring voice role
2017–21	Mickey and the Roadster Racers / Mickey Mouse Mixed-Up Adventures	William "Willie" Bartholomew Beagle	Voice; Episode: "The Big Cheesy"
2018	Modern Family	Doctor Randy	Episode: "Royal Visit"
2019	NCIS: Los Angeles	Frankie Bolton	Episode: "A Bloody Brilliant Plan"
2020	Mom	Rod Knaughton	3 episodes
2022	Monster High: The Movie	Count Dracula	Television film
2023	Monster High 2	Count Dracula	Television film
2023	Riley Rocket	Jon Rockwell	Voice

Writer

Year	Title	Notes
2005	Crossing Jordan	Episode: "Forget Me Not"
2011	The Believers	

Director

Year	Title	Notes
2011	I'm in the Band	Episode: "Grand Theft Weasel"

=== Films ===
Year	Title	Role	Notes
1996	Mars Attacks!	TV Director	
1996	Santa with Muscles	Dr. Blight	
1997	Trojan War	Ponytail Guy	
1998	The Shrunken City	Ood Leader	
1999	Foreign Correspondents	Ian	
1999	The Muse	Four Seasons Assistant Manager	
2000	Return to the Secret Garden	Ellington	
2000	King of the Open Mics	Agent	
2001	Gabriela	Steven	
2003	Dead End	Man in Black	
2007	Spider-Man 3	Model Photographer	
2008	Tinker Bell	Minister of Spring	Voice
2008	Remembering Phil	Miles Delaney	
2009	A Christmas Carol	Funerary Undertaker, Topper	Voice
2012	Secret of the Wings	The Minister of Spring	
2013	Clean Me	Joe Banner	
2014	Mr. Peabody & Sherman	Ay	Voice
2015	The Walk	Barry Greenhouse	

=== Video games ===
Year	Title	Voice role
1993	Citizen X (unreleased until 2002)	Mime
1995	Goosebumps: Escape from Horrorland	Scarecrow, Stretch
2009	Uncharted 2: Among Thieves	Harry Flynn
2009	Dragon Age: Origins	Alistair
2010	Dragon Age: Origins – Awakening	Alistair
2011	Dragon Age II	Alistair
2014	Tesla Effect: A Tex Murphy Adventure	Johannsen
2014	Dragon Age: Inquisition	Alistair
