= Other People (film) =

- Theatrical release poster
- Directed by: Chris Kelly
- Written by: Chris Kelly
- Produced by: Adam Scott; Naomi Scott; Sam Bisbee
- Starring: Jesse Plemons; Molly Shannon; Bradley Whitford; Maude Apatow; Madisen Beaty; John Early; Zach Woods; Josie Totah (Note: Credited as J. J. Totah; she came out as transgender in 2018.); June Squibb
- Cinematography: Brian Burgoyne
- Edited by: Patrick Colman
- Music by: Julian Wass
- Production companies: Park Pictures; Gettin' Rad Productions
- Distributed by: Vertical Entertainment
- Release dates: January 21, 2016 (Sundance); September 9, 2016 (United States)
- Running time: 96 minutes
- Country: United States
- Language: English
- Box office: $91,441

Other People is a 2016 American comedy-drama film written and directed by Chris Kelly in his feature directorial debut. The film stars Jesse Plemons, Molly Shannon, Bradley Whitford, Maude Apatow, Madisen Beaty, John Early, Zach Woods, Josie Totah, and June Squibb. It is a semi-autobiographical look at Kelly's family.

The film had its world premiere at the 2016 Sundance Film Festival on January 21, 2016. The film was released on September 9, 2016, by Vertical Entertainment.

== Plot ==
David Mulcahey, a struggling comedy writer, goes home to Sacramento to take care of his mother Joanne, diagnosed with rare leiomyosarcoma. The film spans a year, following the Mulcahey family as they deal with Joanne's cancer diagnosis.

Back in his childhood home, David reunites with his conservative father Norman, and his two younger sisters Alexandra and Rebeccah. He has a distant relationship with his sisters, and a strained relationship with his father, who still refuses to accept David's sexuality ten years after he came out.

David has recently broken up with his boyfriend, Paul. Not wanting to upset his mother, David tells the family they are still together. David also reconnects with his high school friend Gabe, and meets Gabe's flamboyant adopted brother Justin. Meanwhile, Joanne continues with chemotherapy, though she hates the treatment and eventually decides to quit when the chemo proves to be ineffective. While talking to David about her decision to quit, Joanne apologizes for her initial reaction to him coming out; he forgives her.

In July, Joanne and the family take a trip to New York to attend David's improv show at the Upright Citizens Brigade Theatre. David meets an artistic director at the show and is informed about a new ABC show searching for writers. Encouraged, David begins working on a spec script. After consulting with Paul, David takes the family to Paul's apartment under the guise that they are still in a relationship; Norman refuses to enter the apartment, staying behind. This dismays David, who hoped his father had started to become more accepting of his sexuality. David spends the night with Paul and they end up having sex.

In October, Joanne's health is rapidly deteriorating, and she is put in hospice. David struggles to deal with her impending death; while buying medicine for her at a store, he has a brief meltdown in front of an employee. During a choir practice, David angrily walks out upon finding out another writer was given the ABC position. When Norman follows him outside the church, an enraged David reveals his breakup with Paul, points out Norman's refusal to acknowledge his sexuality, and questions what the future will be like after Joanne passes away. He then instructs his father that Paul will be coming to Joanne's funeral.

One night, Joanne accidentally slips in the shower and is assisted by David. They share a small moment, with Joanne thanking him for coming back to Sacramento, and confiding to him about her future death. Joanne reveals that she sees herself in each of her children, and instructs David: "When you miss me and you want to see me, you just come home and see your sisters." David tearfully promises to take care of Alexandra and Rebeccah and embraces her.

In December, Joanne passes away on her deathbed, surrounded by her family. Norman pays for Paul's plane ticket to Sacramento. The film ends with David joining Norman, Alexandra and Rebeccah in a bedroom, where they are all sleeping.

== Cast ==
- Jesse Plemons as David Mulcahey
- Molly Shannon as Joanne Mulcahey
- Bradley Whitford as Norman Mulcahey
- Maude Apatow as Alexandra Mulcahey
- John Early as Gabe Stewart
- Zach Woods as Paul Cook
- Madisen Beaty as Rebeccah Mulcahey
- Josie Totah as Justin Stewart
- June Squibb as Ruth-Anne
- Paul Dooley as Ronnie
- Retta as Nina
- Matt Walsh as Steve
- Paula Pell as Aunt Patti
- Colton Dunn as Dan
- Mike Mitchell as Donnie
- Nicole Byer as Charlie
- Lennon Parham as Vicki
- Rose Abdoo as Anne
- D'Arcy Carden as Jessica
- Drew Tarver as Craig

== Production ==
The film is loosely based on Kelly's own mother's death in 2009. Kelly chose to deliberately start the film by showing Molly Shannon's character dying "because I didn’t want the movie to be about, 'Well, does she or doesn’t she?'" also noting that it sets the tone for the rest of the movie. Shannon was an early choice for Kelly although his managers expressed doubt about this happening from an early stage. Kelly noted that Shannon in the film resembles his own mother: "I don’t look at the movie and see my dad as that, or myself, or my sisters, but I do see my mom, and it was kind of accidental," adding that he had felt weird directing her due to the similarities. Sissy Spacek was originally attached to play Joanne.

== Release ==
The film had its world premiere at the 2016 Sundance Film Festival on January 21. It was the opening night film at the San Diego International Film Festival and the closing night film at OUTFEST. It also played at film festivals in Dallas, Sarasota, Seattle, Nantucket, Sundance London Prague and Brno.

In February 2016, Netflix acquired worldwide streaming rights to the film. At the same time, Vertical Entertainment picked up the North American theatrical rights for the film and plans on releasing the film in the fall for a campaign targeted at the 2017 Oscars. The film was released on September 9, 2016.

=== Critical reception ===
Other People received positive reviews from critics. It holds an 85% approval rating on review aggregator website Rotten Tomatoes, based on 59 reviews, with an average rating of 7.1/10. The site's critical consensus reads, "Other People resists easy melodrama, rewarding viewers with a smart, subtle look at family dynamics with a talented cast and a finely calibrated blend of funny and serious moments." On Metacritic, the film holds a rating of 68 out of 100, based on 23 critics, indicating "generally favorable reviews".

In its review of the film, The Hollywood Reporter stated, "Ably playing the loving son, a comedy writer quietly worrying that his life is falling apart even without having Mom's cancer in the picture, Jesse Plemons delivers on the promise he has shown in so many supporting roles since his Friday Night Lights breakthrough." New York magazine praised Shannon's performance and the supporting performance of Totah, describing her performance as follows: "The child actor is only featured in two of Other People's scenes—[she] plays the flamboyant younger brother of Plemons’s best friend—but [she] makes the goddamn most of them: Totah waltzes into [her] first scene casually hitting on the far-older Plemons, then spends [her] second scene in drag, staging an over-the-top, twerk-filled performance for [her] bemused family."

=== Awards ===
Molly Shannon won Best Supporting Female at the 2017 Film Independent Spirit Awards while Jesse Plemons was nominated for Best Male Lead; Chris Kelly for Best First Screenplay; and Chris Kelly, Sam Bisbee, Adam Scott, and Naomi Scott for Best First Feature. The film won the Audience Award for Best Narrative Film at the Nantucket Film Festival.
