= Drew Tarver =

American actor (born 1986)

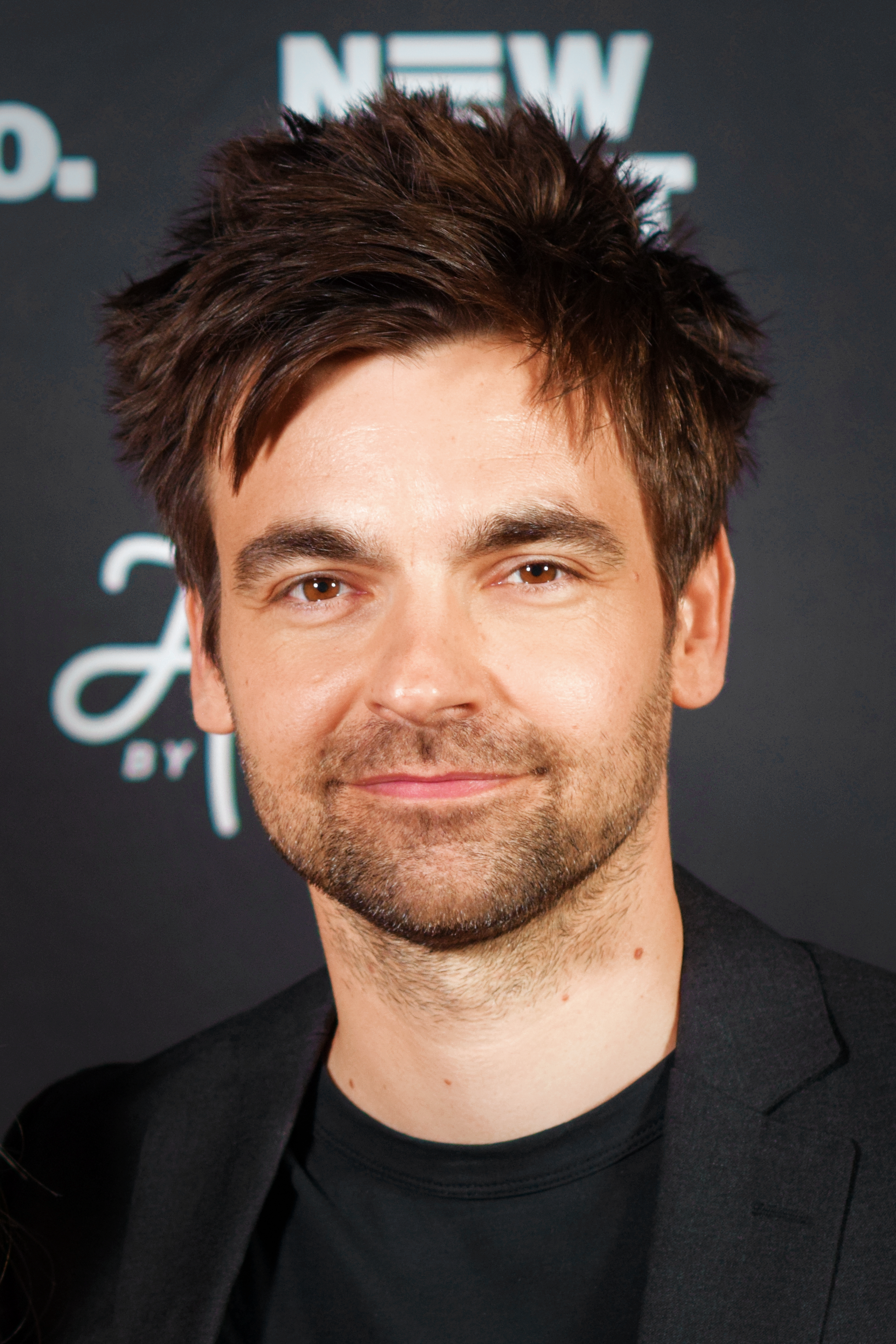
- Tarver in 2023
- Born: Andrew Tarver; May 6, 1986 (age 40); Glennville, Georgia, U.S.
- Occupations: Actor; comedian
- Years active: 2011–present
- Relatives: Katelyn Tarver (sister)

Andrew Tarver (born May 6, 1986) is an American actor and comedian from the Upright Citizens Brigade Theater in Los Angeles. He is best known for playing one of the leads for three seasons on the Emmy-nominated comedy series The Other Two, starring opposite Kate Hudson in the Netflix series Running Point, and for his appearances on comedy podcasts, including Comedy Bang! Bang! and Big Grande: The Teacher's Lounge.

== Early life ==
Tarver was born in Glennville, Georgia. His graduating class had 20 people. His family owned a local candy factory. Tarver is the oldest of four children: he has two sisters, Amanda and actress and singer Katelyn Tarver; and a younger, "cooler" brother, Jake.

Tarver moved to New York City when he was 18. After taking improv classes at Upright Citizens Brigade Theater in New York, he eventually moved to Los Angeles and began performing at the Los Angeles UCB Theater.

== Career ==
Tarver has performed comedy with the Upright Citizens Brigade Theater in Los Angeles since 2010. He is a member of the sketch and improv comedy group Big Grande (alongside comedians Jon Mackey, Ryan Rosenberg, and Dan Lippert) and plays Bill Cravy on their podcast, Big Grande: The Teacher's Lounge. With Big Grande, Tarver co-wrote and starred in a 22-minute original comedy pilot for Funny or Die and several episodes of The UCB Show. Tarver is also a regular guest on the podcast Comedy Bang! Bang!, where his popular characters include Heimlich maneuver inventor Henry Heimlich, 80s new wave singer Martin Sheffield-Lickley, and one half of the country music duo Memphis Kansas Breeze, opposite Carl Tart. The latter two characters originated on the UCB stage and were written by Tarver's frequent collaborators Nick Ciarelli and Brad Evans.

In 2014, Tarver played Todd, the gay best friend of lead Greta Gerwig on the pilot How I Met Your Dad, which was not picked up by CBS.

He was an ensemble cast member on Bajillion Dollar Propertie$, in which he portrayed the role of Baxter Reynolds. The first three seasons streamed on Seeso from 2016 to 2017. The fourth and final season aired on Pluto TV in 2019.

Tarver was cast in the lead role of Cary Dubek in the 2019 Comedy Central series The Other Two. He described it as his first series role that is not an exaggerated comedic character as seen in his previous work in improv and sketch comedy. The show received positive critical reception and ran for three seasons, concluding in June of 2023.

In 2025, Tarver starred opposite Kate Hudson in the Netflix streaming series Running Point. The series, about a family that owns the fictional NBA team the Los Angeles Waves, was co-created by Mindy Kaling and Ike Barinholtz.

== Personal life ==
Tarver came out as bisexual at age 26.

== Filmography ==
Feature films
Year	Title	Role	Notes
2016	Other People	Craig	
2016	Dean	Kip	
2024	The American Society of Magical Negroes	Jason	
2024	Unfrosted	Pop	

Television shows
Year	Title	Role	Notes
2012	Animal Practice	Todd	Episode: "Dr. Yamamazing"
2013	Newsreaders	Counselor #3	Episode: "Gay Camp"
2013	Big Time Rush	Executive #2	Episode: "Big Time Cartoon"
2013	NTSF:SD:SUV::	Marcus	Episode: "A Hard Drive to Swallow"
2014	How I Met Your Dad	Todd	Unaired CBS/FOX pilot
2014	The McCarthys	Ben	Episode: "Love, McCarthys Style"
2015	Filthy Preppy Teen$	Homeless Teen	Episode: "Hangout"
2016	Angel from Hell	Oliver	Episode: "Angel Probation"
2016–17	The UCB Show	Various	5 episodes
2016–19	Bajillion Dollar Propertie$	Baxter Reynolds	Series regular; 34 episodes
2016	Tween Fest	Zayden Ostin Storm	Series regular; 8 episodes
2016	Comedy Bang! Bang!	Donny Gary	Episode: "Scott Aukerman Wears a Tailored Black Suit"
2017	Girlboss	Psychic	Episode: "Thank You, San Francisco"
2018	LA to Vegas	Farley	Episode: "Two and a Half Pilots"
2018	Love	Andrew Cruikshank	Recurring role, 2 episodes
2018–19	Brooklyn Nine-Nine	Officer Gary Jennings	Recurring role, 2 episodes
2018	Superstore	Lonnie	Episode: "Maternity Leave"
2019–23	The Other Two	Cary Dubek	Lead role, 30 episodes
2019–21	Bless the Harts	Randy / Charles Lee (voice)	Recurring role, 23 episodes
2019	Astronomy Club	Robin Hood	Episode: "Lamp Room"
2020	Three Busy Debras	Jason	Episode: "Debspringa"
2020	Mapleworth Murders	Brent Davenport	Recurring role, 3 episodes
2020	Hoops	(voice)	Episode: "Zen"
2021	Inside Job	Kevin (voice)	Episode: "The Brettfast Club"
2022	Ghosts	Micah	Episode: "Jay's Friends"
2023	History of the World, Part II	Adolf Hitler / Private Tully	2 episodes
2025–present	Running Point	Alexander "Sandy" Gordon	Series regular, 20 episodes
