= Todd Holland =

American director and producer (born 1961)

- Born: December 13, 1961 (age 64); Kittanning, Pennsylvania, US
- Occupations: Film director television director television producer
- Years active: 1985–present
- Spouse: Scotch Ellis Loring (m. 2008)
- Children: 3

Todd Holland (born December 13, 1961) is an American film and television director and producer. He directed over 50 episodes of The Larry Sanders Show, for which he received an Emmy, and 26 episodes of Malcolm in the Middle, for which he received two Emmy Awards. His feature films include The Wizard (1989), Krippendorf's Tribe (1998), and Firehouse Dog (2007), and had also directed the TV movie Monster High: The Movie (2022) and its 2023 sequel.

== Early life and education ==
Holland was born in Kittanning, Pennsylvania and raised in Meadville, Pennsylvania. He was an honor student, graduating from Meadville Area Sr. High School-M. A. S. H. While there, he wrote, directed and produced several parodies of movies popular at the time. He graduated in 1985 from UCLA's school of Theater, Film and Television.

== Career ==
Holland got his career break when Steven Spielberg saw his UCLA thesis film Chicken Thing—a 12-minute comedy horror short—and hired Holland to write and direct on the second season of Amazing Stories.

Holland directed 52 episodes of The Larry Sanders Show for HBO. He received an Emmy for the 1998 series finale "FLIP".

Holland then started working with Linwood Boomer on the Fox sitcom Malcolm in the Middle where he directed 26 episodes and served as co-executive producer for the show. Holland earned two Emmy Awards for the show: both wins were for Outstanding Directing for a Comedy Series, his first one for the pilot episode of the series, the second for the season two episode "Bowling"—for which he also won the DGA award for excellence in comedy directing.

Holland co-created the 2004 television series Wonderfalls with Bryan Fuller, for which they received a WGA nomination.

He has also directed the feature films The Wizard, Krippendorf's Tribe and Firehouse Dog.

Holland has directed twice for the NBC sitcom 30 Rock. He directed the episode "Generalissimo," an episode for which he received his seventh Emmy Award nomination but lost to Jeffrey Blitz for The Office.

Holland worked with Justin Berfield, with whom he had worked on Malcolm in the Middle, on Sons of Tucson, a 2010 Fox television sitcom. He directed five of the thirteen episodes and executive produced the series.

Two of his shows were named in TV Guide's "100 greatest Episodes of Television", the "Everybody Loves Larry" episode of The Larry Sanders Show and the "Life of Brian" episode of My So-Called Life.

In 2022, Holland directed Monster High: The Movie (which is based on the Monster High franchise) and its 2023 sequel Monster High 2 which he co-wrote.

== Personal life ==
Holland has been married to actor and singer Scotch Ellis Loring since 2008. The couple are fathers to triplets, born in 2010 via a surrogate.

== Filmography ==
Feature films

- The Wizard (1989)
- Krippendorf's Tribe (1998)
- Firehouse Dog (2007)

TV movies

- Five Houses (1998)
- Kilroy (1998)
- Ball & Chain (2001)
- The Time Tunnel (2004)
- Amy Coyne (2006)
- Fugly (2007 FOX unaired pilot)
- Isabel (2012)
- The Pro (2014)
- Furst Born (2016)
- Charlie Foxtrot (2017)
- Steps (2018)
- Monster High: The Movie (2022)
- Monster High 2 (2023)

TV series

Year	Title	Notes
1986	Amazing Stories	2 episodes
1987	Max Headroom	Episode: "Dream Thieves"
1988	Vietnam War Story	Episode: "Separated"
1990–1991	Twin Peaks	2 episodes
1991	Tales from the Crypt	Episode: "Top Billing"
1992	Eerie, Indiana	Episode: "The Broken Record"
1992	Bill & Ted's Excellent Adventures	Episode: "Stand Up Guy"
1992–1998	The Larry Sanders Show	51 episodes
1994–1995	My So-Called Life	2 episodes
1996	Relativity	Episode: "First Impressions"
1998	Maximum Bob	Episode: "Wandalust"
1998–1999	Felicity	3 episodes
1999	Tracey Takes On...	6 episodes
1999	Friends	Episode: "The One Where Rachel Smokes"
2000–2004	Malcolm in the Middle	26 episodes
2000	D.C.	Episode: "Pilot"
2000	FreakyLinks	2 episodes
2002	Girls Club	2 episodes
2004	Wonderfalls	5 episodes
2007	Miss Guided	4 episodes
2009–2010	30 Rock	2 episodes
2010	Sons of Tucson	5 episodes
2011	Shameless	Episode: "Casey Casden"
2011–2012	Free Agents	3 episodes
2012–2013	Go On	7 episodes
2013	The Michael J. Fox Show	Episode: "Christmas"
2014	About a Boy	Episode: "About Total Exuberance"
2014	Friends with Better Lives	3 episodes
2014	Selfie	Episode: "Even Hell Has Two Bars"
2014	Red Band Society	Episode: "What I Did for Love"
2015	Stitchers	Episode: "A Stitch in Time"
2015–2019	Unbreakable Kimmy Schmidt	2 episodes
2016–2017	The Real O'Neals	10 episodes
2017	Me, Myself & I	2 episodes
2018	Black-ish	2 episodes
2019	Fam	3 episodes
2019	The Unicorn	Episode: "No Small Parts"
2020	Love, Victor	Episode: "Boys' Trip"
2021	Mr. Mayor	Episode: "Pilot"
2022	Grace and Frankie	Episode: "The Prediction"
2023	Not Dead Yet	Episode: "Not a Tiger Yet"
2024	So Help Me Todd	Episode: "Is the Jury Out Yet?"
2026	Best Medicine	2 episodes

Music video

- Slick Rick - "Children's Story" (1989)
