= Screenagers =

- Directed by: Delaney Ruston
- Screenplay by: Delaney Ruston
- Produced by: Delaney Ruston, Scilla Andreen, Lisa Tabb
- Cinematography: Delaney Ruston
- Music by: Paul Brill
- Release date: January 25, 2016
- Running time: 90 minutes
- Country: United States
- Language: English

Screenagers is a documentary created and directed by Delaney Ruston, a physician and film director, to describe growing up in a tech saturated world where it is her opinion that balance needs to be drawn between screen time and screen free time. In the documentary, filmmaker Delaney Ruston must decide if she should give an iPhone to her teenage daughter.
