= Case Walker =

American actor (born 2003)

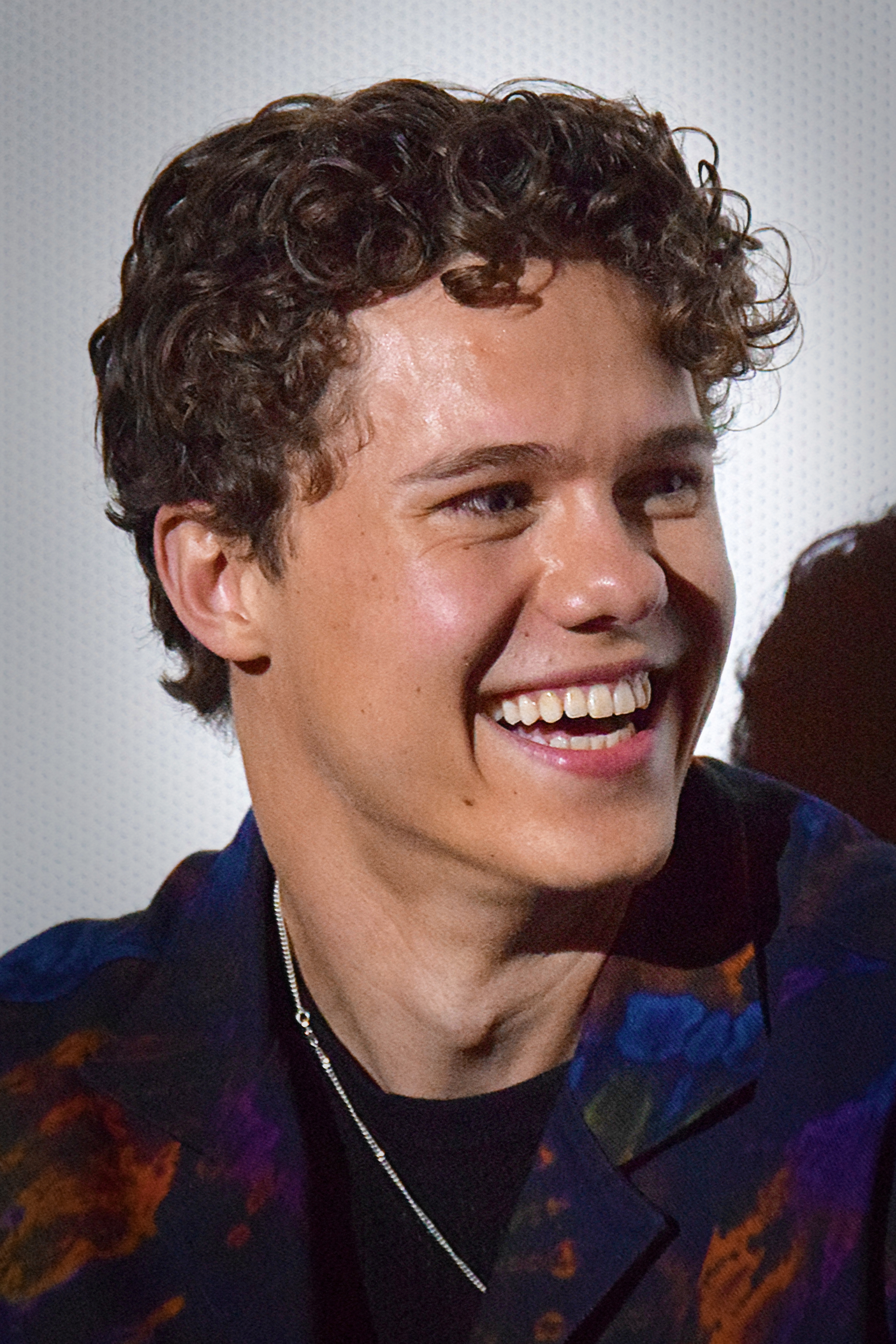
- Walker in 2023
- Born: February 25, 2003 (age 23)
- Occupations: Actor; singer; social media personality
- Years active: 2018-present
- Spouse: Madeleine Walker (m. 2026)

Case Walker (born February 25, 2003) is an American actor and singer. He has played Chase Dubek on the TV series The Other Two and Deuce Gorgon in the Monster High film series.

== Life and career ==
Walker was raised in the area of Denver, Colorado, and has a twin brother, Cole. Before becoming an actor, he gained a following of 1.7 million on the social media service Musical.ly and 350,000 on Instagram.

Walker was cast in the comedy television series The Other Two (2019–2023) at age 14. He played Chase Dubek, a teenager who becomes famous on social media after making a viral song as ChaseDreams. The show's creators discovered him on a Musical.ly top ten list and contacted him to audition through the app. He went to online school during shooting and later began attending film school.

While shooting The Other Two season three, Walker also starred in the musical film Monster High: The Movie (2022), and he followed that with the sequel Monster High 2 (2023). He wrote a song for his Monster High audition which he said got him the part.

== Personal life ==
Walker is an avid rock climber. In 2025, Case Walker became engaged to Madeleine Winscott. The couple married in June 2026.

== Filmography ==
Year(s)	Title	Role	Notes
2019	The JoJo & BowBow Show Show	Jacob (voice)	3 episodes
2019–2023	The Other Two	Chase Dubek	Main role
2022	Monster High: The Movie	Deuce Gorgon	Television film
2026	Elsbeth	Tyler Hollis	Guest role
