= List of Monster High characters =

Monster High, a fashion doll and media franchise created by Garrett Sander and released by American toy company Mattel on June 11, 2010, features a variety of fictional characters, many of whom are students at the titular high school. The female characters are classified as Ghouls and the male characters are classified as Mansters. The characters are generally the sons and daughters, or related to monsters that have been popularized in fiction. The now-defunct official website identified six of the characters as Original Ghouls, although a seventh member was often added in films, episodes, and promotional images. In addition to the listed Ghouls and Mansters, there are other characters who have been introduced in the franchise's related media including the web/video and book series. In 2016, Natali Germanotta, sister of singer Lady Gaga, designed Zomby Gaga for the franchise as a partnership with the Born This Way Foundation.

== Main characters ==
Six of the Monster High characters have been classified as Original Ghouls according to the official website. On certain occasions a seventh member is added to the main group.

=== Frankie Stein ===
Frankie Stein (voiced by Kate Higgins from 2010 to 2015 (Note: Frankie Stein's singing voice in New Ghoul @ School was provided by Allison Iraheta.) and Cassandra Lee Morris thereafter, Iris Menas in the 2022 TV series, portrayed by Ceci Balagot in the live-action films) is the daughter of Frankenstein's monster and his bride. Frankie is styled after the popular image of Frankenstein's monster, with pale green skin, stitched limbs and neck bolts. She is characterised as kind and optimistic, but is also naive due to being only 15 days old at the beginning of the web series. She is shown to have some power to control electricity.

In the 2022 reboot, Frankie is the child of mad scientists Dr. Mary and Dr. Victor Stein, created using "the best and brightest minds in monster history". Unlike previous iterations, this Frankie is non-binary and uses they/them pronouns. Frankie also has a cybernetic left leg and is dating Cleo de Nile. This iteration of Frankie has blue skin instead of green and lacks neck bolts due to Universal Pictures owning the rights to the popular appearance of Frankenstein's monster.

=== Draculaura ===
Draculaura (voiced by Debi Derryberry in most projects, Courtney Lin in the 2022 TV series, portrayed by Naya Damasen in the live-action films) is the Romanian daughter of Dracula. Despite being a vampire, she is a vegan who consumes fruits, vegetables, and "a lot of iron supplements" instead of blood, fainting at the mere sight or mention of it. Mattel vice-president of design, Kiyomi Haverly, commented on this trait, saying, "She's a vegan. She's turned off by meat. Girls could really relate to that because that's part of what they're thinking of these days." Initially 1,599 years old, Draculaura turns 1,600 in the webisode "Party Planners" and in the 2012 film special, Why Do Ghouls Fall In Love, with Mattel releasing the doll line Sweet 1600 based around her birthday. In Frights, Camera, Action, Draculaura unlocks her vampire powers including the ability to transform into a bat.

The character is portrayed as friendly and excitable is one of the friendliest and among the most popular ghouls at Monster High. In the original run, she is in a relationship with Clawd Wolf, older brother to Clawdeen Wolf, and has a pet bat named Count Fabulous.

In the franchise's first reboot, Draculaura originally lived with her father Dracula in a mansion on a hill overlooking "normie town", and, wanting to have friends like her, she talked her father into turning the mansion into Monster High, as seen in the first film Welcome to Monster High. She and her friends often go on adventures to find more monsters to enroll.

The 2022 reboot portrays Draculaura as having Taiwanese heritage on her mother's side. Her father remains Dracula. She faces pressure to be an excellent student like her father and relatives. She is still a vegan, however now sustains off of energy from success and feeling good about herself. She holds a secret passion for witchcraft, a practice strictly forbidden in the monster world due to the threat it poses to monsterkind. Draculaura aims to become a full-fledged witch, all the while fighting for witches to be more accepted in monster society.

In the live-action films, Draculaura is initially a private person before befriending Clawdeen and Frankie after who accept her praciticing witchcraft. Her veganism is not mentioned, and she threatens Clawdeen and Frankie with drinking their blood, but otherwise is not suggested to drink blood.

=== Clawdeen Wolf ===
Clawdeen Wolf (voiced by Salli Saffioti in most projects, Gabrielle Nevaeh in the 2022 TV series, portrayed by Miia Harris in the live-action films) is the Brooklyn-accented African-American 15-year-old daughter of a werewolf. In the live-action film, she is the daughter of a human named Apollo and a werewolf named Selena, but only her father is still around. Two of her siblings, Clawd and Howleen, study alongside her at Monster High, while her older sister Clawdia has graduated.

Clawdeen aspires to become a fashion designer in Scaris. As a werewolf, she possesses immense strength and speed, especially during the full moon, but this also makes her prone to bad moods and fiery tempers. She also has a purple pet kitten named Crescent.

In the 2022 reboot, Clawdeen is the Afro-Latina daughter of a werewolf mother and a human father. Before learning her werewolf heritage, she spent most of her life in the human world, where she always had an interest in monsters. On her fifteenth birthday, she was gifted a necklace by her father, and with its guidance, she stumbled upon Monster High. Clawdeen later discovers that her necklace is a magical moonclaw talisman which gives her increased strength, speed, and the ability to transform at will. Throughout the first season, she aims to find her mother Selena, who had disappeared many years ago into another dimension called Beheme; she eventually achieves this in the season finale, and becomes the new leader of the werebeasts.

In the live-action films, Clawdeen spent her life hiding in the human world but is forced to flee after being exposed as half-werewolf. and spends much of the first film in fear of being discovered as half human, as they are unwelcome at Monster High, which accepts only those with "true monster hearts". In the sequel, Clawdeen is more confident and popular, and becomes student representative, beating her opponent Toralei Stripe.

=== Lagoona Blue ===
Lagoona Blue (voiced by Laura Bailey until 2015, Larissa Gallagher thereafter until 2018, Valeria Rodriquez in the 2022 TV series, portrayed by Lina Lecompte in the live-action films) is originally the daughter of the gill-man Wade Blue and a sea nymph. She is portrayed as a blue-skinned monster with golden curls with blue highlights. She typically has an athletic and tomboyish style with ocean-related motifs. She is also described on the Monster High website as laid back and very active.

Due to her childhood in the Great Scarrier Reef and her heritage, she is a skilled swimmer on the Monster High swim team. Despite sharing mutual feelings with another monster, Gillington "Gil" Webber, his parents disapprove of their relationship due to her sea-monster heritage. She briefly became a freshwater monster in 13 Wishes.

In the 2022 reboot, Lagoona is a pink-skinned Honduran sea monster described as having grown up in a sunken Castillo with little knowledge of the outside world. Lagoona is fierce and savage, but also sweet and bubbly; she loves romance and telenovelas.

=== Cleo de Nile ===
Cleo de Nile (voiced by Salli Saffioti in most projects, Kausar Mohammed in the 2022 TV series, portrayed by Jy Prishkulnik in the live-action films) is the second daughter of Egyptian mummy Ramses de Nile. In the original continuity, she is Monster High's "queen bee" – the most popular girl in school – as well as the student council president and captain of the Fearleading Squad. Her boyfriend is the popular Deuce Gorgon and they share a close relationship.

Being a mummy who was preserved for many years, her appearance is that of a 16-year-old girl, but she is actually over 3,000 years old. While her online profile lists her as being 3,357 years old, other iterations place her age at 5,842 years old.

In the 2022 reboot, Cleo maintains her position as the school's queen bee. She and Deuce are no longer romantically involved, with the first live-action movie specifying that her egocentric behavior led to Deuce breaking up with her. Cleo initially antagonizes Frankie and Clawdeen but has a change of heart after Clawdeen pushes her out of the way of a falling gargoyle, saving her life. In the TV series, Cleo is kinder than her live-action and original versions, but she still has a desire to be number one. Having broken up with Deuce, she now dates Frankie Stein.

=== Ghoulia Yelps ===
Ghoulia Yelps (vocal effects by Audu Paden in most projects, voiced by Felicia Day in the 2022 TV series, portrayed by Lilah Fitzgerald in the live-action films) is the bespectacled daughter of a zombie couple from Canada. She is Cleo's personal assistant and best friend. The smartest ghoul at Monster High, she is a shy and bookish girl with a sense of mischief. She can only speak in moans and groans – a physical limitation that all zombies have.

Ghoulia has a romantic interest in Sloman "Slo Mo" Mortavitch, a zombie who plays in the chess team. In her free time, she is a hardcore fan of an in-universe comic book series titled "Dead Fast", and enjoys dodgeball. Her favorite color is red and she has a pet baby blue owl named Sir Hoots-a-Lot.

In the 2022 reboot, Ghoulia has green skin instead of grey, no longer limps, and can speak legibly. She is the best gamer at Monster High as well as a skilled skateboarder.

Although introduced as one of the six Original Ghouls, she was no longer listed among them following the 2016 film special, Welcome to Monster High. However, as of the 2022 reboot, she returned to being part of the main group, being released with the others during Wave 1.

=== Abbey Bominable ===
Abbey Bominable (voiced by Erin Fitzgerald until 2015, Cristina Milizia between 2017 and 2018, Aishwarya Pillai in the 2022 TV series, portrayed by Nasiv Sail in the live-action films) is the daughter of the Yeti. She has white hair with blue, pink and purple streaks; and blue skin. She has a baby woolly mammoth named Shiver. She is Ghoulia Yelps' translator.

She is in a relationship with Heath Burns, who she claims "makes her laugh". During the school week, Abbey stays at Headless Headmistress Bloodgood's house. Abbey has yeti-tusks that pop up from the bottom of her mouth, touching her upper lip. Abbey also displays psychokinetic abilities, or the power to form and manipulate ice.

In the 2022 reboot, Abbey is originally from Nepal. She grew up alone in Mount Neverest (Mount Everest) because other monsters were afraid of yetis, but the Boo Crew realized yetis are not bad when meeting her. Abbey is characterized as friendly and very clumsy.

Although it was never directly stated that she was part of the Original Ghouls, she always appeared alongside the others as the seventh member, as one of the main characters in episodes and films. However, she was never listed among them again after the 2016 movie special, Welcome to Monster High.

== Ghouls ==
The following characters listed below are referred to as Ghouls according to the official now-defunct/offline Monster High website: (Note: List only the 54-6 Ghouls from the website. Group pets and parents under those particular characters.)

=== Amanita Nightshade ===
Amanita Nightshade (voiced by Heather Moiseve) is a plant monster who was born from the seed of the Corpse Flower, an extremely rare flower which only blooms every 1,300 years. She has purple hair and light green skin. She is very vain, and likes being the center of attention. In the webisode "Bad Tomb-mates", she reveals that she and Cleo were rivals. She blooms once every 1300 years; when she came out, the villagers gifted her to the De Nile family and she became tomb-mates with Cleo. However, she has a habit of "borrowing" people's stuff and later disappearing. Her doll debuted in 2015.

=== Ari Hauntington ===
Ari Hauntington (voiced by Jonquil Goode) is the daughter of two ghosts. She has purple hair with pale grey eyes and translucent pale white skin. She is a pop singer, who inspires monsters to be themselves. Ari appeared in the 2016 film special, Welcome to Monster High.

=== Astranova ===
Astranova (voiced by Erin Fitzgerald and Firoozeh Scoot for singing vocals) is the daughter of the comet aliens, first appearing in the 2015 musical film Monster High: Boo York, Boo York. She has bluish-purplish skin and blue eyes. Astranova's family has a connection with Ancient Egypt, which is possibly based on the popular urban myth that aliens helped built the Egyptian pyramids.

=== Avea Trotter ===
Avea Trotter (voiced by Haviland Stillwell) is a hybrid monster; her father is a centaur and her mother is a harpy. She has the body of a horse with black wings. Avea first appears in the 2014 film special Freaky Fusion, where she and the other hybrids help Frankie Stein's friends after they were fused together on a return trip from the past.

=== Batsy Claro ===
Batsy Claro (voiced by Cristina Milizia) is the 17-year-old daughter of a white vampire bat. She has light green hair, brown eyes, pale white skin and white wings. Her clothing is mostly green. She loves nature and protecting the environment. She was introduced with the Brand Boo line as an exchange student from Ghosta Shrieka.

=== Bonita Femur ===
Bonita Femur (voiced by Geeg Friedman) is a hybrid monster: her father is a mothman, and her mother is a skeleton. She has light pink skin and pink bony wings. She enjoys shopping for vintage fashions at the flea market. When she gets nervous, she chews through her own clothes, especially if they are made of wool or silk. She debuted in the 2014 film special, Freaky Fusion.

=== Catrine DeMew ===
Catrine DeMew (voiced by Kate Higgins in Scaris: City of Frights, Karen Strassman in Volumes 4 and 5 of the web series) is the daughter of a werecat and originates from Scaris, France. She has purple shoulder-length hair with pink streaks, light blue eyes, pale white skin, and enjoys visual arts such as panting and drawing. Catrine debuted in doll form at the 2012 San Diego Comic-Con, in the 2013 film special, Scaris: City of Frights, and as a Wal-Mart exclusive in 2013. She is the subject of a Monster High online video game called Catrine Demew Real Makeover, where players can pick her appearance for her Monster High debut.

=== Catty Noir ===
Catty Noir (voiced by Missi Hale in the We Are Monster High lyric video, Karen Strassman in Volume 4 and Boo York, Boo York, Amber Riley in the 2022 TV series) is the daughter of a werecat. She first appears in the 2013 film special 13 Wishes towards its end, but her first major appearance is the main/headline character in the 2015 musical film, Monster High: Boo York, Boo York, where her style rivals that of Nefera de Nile.

In the 2022 series, Catty is African-American and is a pop music star from Boo York.

=== Casta Fierce ===
Casta Fierce (voiced by Erin Fitzgerald) is the 19-year-old daughter of Circe and is a witch. She is the lead singer of Casta and the Spells, a pop band that plays live once a year on Halloween. As a witch, she has to be careful to sing the right lyrics, in case she ends up turning the audience members into animals. Her name is based on Sasha Fierce, an alter-ego of the American singer Beyoncé.

=== Clawdia Wolf ===
Clawdia Wolf (voiced by Jonquil Goode) is the daughter of a werewolf. She currently lives in Londoom, Fangland, where she studies Dramatic Writing in hopes to make it as a screenwriter in Hauntlywood. She is not very good at sports, and is always studying. She is the older sister of Clawdeen, Clawd and Howleen. Clawdia is a featured character in the 2014 film, Frights, Camera, Action. Her doll was first exhibited at the 2013 San Diego Comic-Con, and released later that year to complement the special.

=== Dayna Treasura Jones ===
Dayna Treasura Jones is the daughter of Davy Jones. She wears a hat in the shape of an open treasure chest and parrot earrings. Dayna is featured in the Shriek Wrecked line of Monster High dolls introduced in late 2015 and showcased at Mattel's Toy Fair 2016.

=== Elissabat ===
Elissabat (voiced by Karen Strassman) is the Transylvanian-born daughter of a vampire, who was a childhood friend of Draculaura. She was supposed to become the next Vampire Queen, but found out that Lord Stoker (the vampire who chose her as the next queen) was planning to run the kingdom through her. With the help of Robecca Steams' father Hexiciah, she escaped to Hauntlywood and assumed the alias Veronica von Vamp. Her secret is eventually revealed by Draculaura and she becomes Vampire Queen after ousting Lord Stoker.

Elissabat's doll was first featured at the 2014 New York Comic Con, with the characters of Frights, Camera, Action.

=== Elle Eedee ===
Elle Eedee (voiced by Laura Bailey) is the daughter of robots, and her name is a pun on the acronym "L.E.D." Her favorite activity is being a DJ, producing dance music. She first appears in Monster High: Boo York, Boo York. Elle is in need of an upgrade once in a while, even more than Robecca Steam, despite being a younger robot. She is best friends with Luna Mothews and Mouscedes King.

=== Gigi Grant ===
Gigi Grant (voiced by Joni Goode) is the daughter of a genie and is a featured character in 13 Wishes. She has pink hair with some orange streaks in it, and usually styles it in a ponytail. She has a pet scorpion named Sultan Sting.

=== Gilda Goldstag ===
Gilda Goldstag is the daughter of the Golden Hind. She has short pink hair, large horns, and gold skin. She is a member of the Student Disembody Council, serving as the treasurer.

=== Gooliope Jellington ===
Gooliope Jellington (voiced by Julie Maddalena Kliewer) is the creation of an unnamed scientist.

Gooliope was created as experiment #816 in batch #8708, in an unnamed lab. Fearing for her safety and believing that she would be experimented on, Gooliope's creator left her in a jar at a traveling circus called the Freak du Chic, where she was adopted by the ringmaster and his wife. After outgrowing her jar, Gooliope was employed as the circus' ringmaster. Gooliope came across Monster High on one of the circus stops and attends as a student when the circus is on break.

=== Honey Swamp ===
Honey Swamp (voiced by Laura Bailey) is the daughter of the Honey Island Swamp monster and originates from New Goreleans. She aspires to be a cinematographer, and her doll accessories include a video camera and a clapboard. She was announced at the 2013 San Diego Comic-Con, and debuted in the cartoons in Frights, Camera, Action. Honey's doll was designed by Natalie Villegas, and was released in 2014.

=== Howleen Wolf ===
Howleen Wolf (voiced by America Young in most episodes of the web series, Lara Jill Miller in some episodes of the web series, Victoria K. Washington in the 2022 series) is the daughter of the werewolf, the younger sister of Clawdeen, and the youngest of the Wolf siblings at Monster High. She is the main character in the 2013 film special, 13 Wishes, where she unleashes a genie who grants her 13 wishes to make. The 13 Wishes doll set won a TimeToPlayMag's People Play Award in the category of "Dolls – Fashion" in 2013.

Ariella Papa wrote in The Huffington Post (now commonly known as simply HuffPost) that "Howleen Wolf is a confident cool character" and when her children had considered putting on makeup to look like the Wolf sisters, it raised some interesting issues regarding whether that was considered blackface. Christopher Moonlight of The Movie Pilot blog wrote about Howleen's significant role as an "insecure and spiteful underdog" in the 2011 TV special, Fright On, where she is convinced by Van Hellscream to join a "Were-Pride" faction that ends up sowing animosity between the werewolves and the vampires.

In the 2022 TV series, Howleen is not depicted as the sister of Clawdeen and is a member of Monster High's Werewolf Council alongside Romulus and Barkimedes due to her being a full werewolf. Unlike her other companions, Howleen genuinely wants to help Clawdeen fit in, and is her teammate on the school basketball team. She later also becomes close with Venus McFlytrap.

=== Iris Clops ===
Iris Clops (voiced by Kate Higgins in the web series episode Fear the Book, Paula Bodin in Volumes 4 and 5 of the web series and in the feature-length films, Freaky Fusion in 2014, and Haunted in 2015, Courtney Lin in the 2022 series) is the daughter of the Cyclops. Besides her singular large green eye, she has green hair styled in pigtails and green skin. Her clothing style also has patterns that include eyes in them. She tends to be a bit clumsy due to her lack of depth perception. Her doll was released as part of the I Heart Fashion line.

In the 2022 TV series, Iris is a little over weighted, but also athletic, as she made in the fear squad.

=== Isi Dawndancer ===
Isi Dawndancer is the daughter of a Deer Spirit. She has long blue hair and brown eyes, as well as brown deer ears. She wears a headband with antlers. She comes from a line of Boo Hexican deer spirits.

=== Jane Boolittle ===
Jane Boolittle (voiced by Stephanie Sheh) is the daughter of mad scientist Doctor Boolittle. She grew up talking mainly to animals and attends Monster High so she can interact more with monster teens like herself. She has black and red streaked hair, although her website profile depicts her with purple and pink hair. She has a light blue pet voodoo sloth named Needles who doubles as a backpack accessory for her doll. Her doll was revealed at the 2013 San Diego Comic-Con, and her first appearance in the web series was in the two-part episode "Boolittle".

=== Jinafire Long ===
Jinafire Long (voiced by Stephanie Sheh in most projects, Anna Cathcart in the 2022 TV series) is the daughter of a Chinese dragon. She has black hair with green streaks, yellow eyes and skin, and a thin yellow dragon tail. She has appeared in multiple Monster High doll lines, including Scaris: City of Frights, Freak du Chic, Ghouls Getaway, New Scare-mester and Gloom & Bloom. Jinafire was inspired by Monster High toy designer Rebecca Shipman's travels throughout Asia,.

In the 2022 reboot, Jinafire grew up in America. She is first seen vacationing at the Scare-adise Resort with her parents, who were visiting from Fanghai.

=== Kala Mer'ri ===
Kala Mer'ri (voiced by Lyndsy Kail) is an Icelandic sea monster ghoul introduced in the 2016 film special. Great Scarrier Reef. She has purple and red hair, pink skin, four arms, and tentacled legs. Her doll glows in the dark with bioluminescent effects. She prefers to keep her heritage a secret.

=== Kiyomi Haunterly ===
Kiyomi Haunterly (voiced by Joy Lerner) is a character who debuts in the 2015 film special "Haunted". Kiyomi is the purple-haired daughter of the Noppera-bō (Faceless Ghost). Kiyomi normally has no face, but is able to project the likeness of a face.

=== Kjersti Trollsøn ===
Kjersti Trollsøn (Note: Alternative spellings for Kjersti Trollsøn include Kjersti Trollson and Kjersti Trollsonn.) is the daughter of a mountain troll. She has pink and blue hair, and wears pink bit-framed glasses, an aqua helmet with horns, a black and pink dress. She enjoys playing video games; her handbag is shaped like a video game console controller. She debuted as part of the Brand-Boo monster line as an exchange student from Goreway.

=== Lorna McNessie ===
Lorna McNessie (voiced by Marieve Herington) is the daughter of the Loch Ness Monster. She is an exchange student from the Highlands of Rotland. She has bright orange hair and blue-green skin with webbed hands and a tail. Her clothing includes a red plaid beret, shirt, and tartan skirt. Her favorite activity is photobombing, which literary scholar Aleksandra Mochocka rated as a "certain intertextual playfulness" in character creation by Mattel. In her storyline, she transfers to Monster High to avoid the publicity that came from appearing out of the Loch. She was presented at San Diego Comic-Con in 2014. Graeme Ambrose, of Loch Ness Bid organization praised the concept: "The monster is shrouded in mystery and perhaps slightly scary in a nice way for children and it is therefore of little surprise that Mattel have chosen to introduce this character, daughter of the Loch Ness Monster. ... I am sure that it will have many children begging their parents to take them to Loch Ness which can only be of benefit to the area." Her doll is part of the Monster Exchange line introduced in December 2014.

=== Luna Mothews ===
Luna Mothews (voiced by Lauren Weisman) is the daughter of the Mothman, first appearing in Monster High: Boo York, Boo York. She has black hair and yellow skin. She is from Boo Jersey and aspires to work on show-biz especially Bloodway. Her style is described as "goth-moth".

=== Marisol Coxi ===
Marisol Coxi (voiced by Cristina Milizia) is the daughter of South American Bigfoot and becomes an exchange student to Monster High from her homeland of Monster Picchu. She is fairly tall and has pink hair, purple skin, and bright green braids. She likes big and loud fashion: her clothing includes an orange jacket with bigfoot prints, a strapless short dress that is pink on top and black with floral designs and a green skirting at the bottom. She has pink platform shoes to go with her elongated feet. Her doll was part of the Monster Exchange line introduced in December 2014.

=== Moanica D'Kay ===
Moanica D'Kay (voiced by Cristina Milizia) is a Latina ghoul and the daughter of Zombies. She has purple hair with a yellow streak, green eyes, and a grey body. Her doll was released to go with the Welcome to Monster High reboot film special in 2016, in which she plays its villain who is hoping for a zombie apocalypse where she commands an army of "zomboys". She enters as a rival candidate for student council on the platform that peace can be achieved through coercion. M. Enois Duarte, a DVD reviewer for Hi-Def Digest described her as "a zombie outsider with a chip on her shoulder who speaks from her dead-hearted, prejudiced and undiplomatic gut.". Her doll was originally packaged with Draculaura as part of a Monstrous Rivals set.

=== Mouscedes King ===
Mouscedes King (voiced by Rachel Staman in Monster High: Boo York, Boo York, Alexa Kahn in the 2022 TV series) is the daughter of the Rat King. She has pink hair and gray skin and mouse ears, as well as ballet shoes. However, she is lactose intolerant and her favorite food is sharp cheddar cheese made of rice. She first appears in Monster High: Boo York, Boo York.

In the 2022 series, Mouscedes is a student at Monster High. Although she considers herself shy, she is actually very sociable, talkative, and friendly. She is also a bit spoiled, as her father buys her new cars for every time she passes school midterms.

=== Nefera de Nile ===
Nefera de Nile (voiced by Wendee Lee until 2018, Krystina Alabado in the 2022 TV series) is the daughter of Ramses de Nile and is Cleo's older sister by three years. She has blue, black and gold streaked hair, and purple eyes, and her clothes resemble Cleo's in their bandaged pattern, hers consisting of a wrap top and wrap skirt. She wears a snake necklace, jeweled earrings and a gold hairpiece as marks of her royal heritage. She has a pet scarab beetle named Azura.

While she and Cleo are both divas in their own right, Nefera is simultaneously cold, selfish, and contemptuous towards most other monsters, and particularly enjoys humiliating her younger sister. In much of the franchise, she thus takes on an antagonistic role and frequently allies with Toralei, Purrsephone, and Meowlody. Nefera's diary reveals that she has an inferiority complex so severe that if she feels that someone is insulting her in the slightest, she breaks down and suffers a blackout.

In the 2022 series, Nefera is kind and nice, as well as a student-teacher at Monster High. She treats her sister Cleo with love, but does not realize Cleo feels jealous for Nefera always being in first place.

=== Operetta ===
Operetta (voiced by Cindy Robinson except in Volume 2 of the webisodes, Gigi Sarroino in other appearances) is the daughter of Phantom of the Opera. She has red hair with purple streaks, purple eyes, and white skin. She describes herself as a high-octane rockabilly. Her clothes include a white jacket with piano key print, denim capris and heeled saddle shoes. She plays a coffin-shaped guitar. She has a pet spider named Memphis "Daddy O" Longlegs. Operetta's doll was designed by Natalie Villegas.

=== Peri and Pearl Serpentine ===
Peri and Pearl Serpentine (voiced by Rachel Staman and Cherami Leigh) are the two-headed daughters of the Hydra, first introduced as part of the Great Scarrier Reef TV/film special and doll line. They share the same body, but have two different heads: Peri has dark blue hair while Pearl has platinum blonde hair. The Serpentines love bling and adorn gold jewelry such as a necklace and chain-and-bead belt.

=== Posea Reef ===
Posea Reef (voiced by Paula Rhodes) is the daughter of the sea god Poseidon. She tends her father's seascape on the Great Scarrier Reef. Her favorite phrase is to "go with the flow". She has purple hair with multi-colored streaks, greenish-blue eyes, blue skin, webbed hands, and coral-like strands for feet. Her clothing consists of a purple/black top that is printed with sea images and a large purple coral frame on top. Her skirt is aqua blue and is covered with light green seaweed. Her doll glows in the dark.

=== Purrsephone and Meowlody ===
Purrsephone and Meowlody (both voiced by America Young in earlier appearances, Cindy Robinson in later appearances, Riki Lindhome and Kate Micucci respectively in the 2022 TV series) are the twin daughters of the Werecat and are sometimes referred to as the Werecat Sisters. Both have dark gray fur, though Purrsephone's hair is predominantly black with a white streak, and Meowlody's hair is white with a black streak. The sisters' dolls have been released as a 2-pack, and also as a 3-pack with fellow Werecat Toralei as Fearleaders. The profile art was done by Darko Dordevic.

In the 2022 reboot, Purrsephone and Meowlody wear different hair styles and different clothes from each other's. In the reboot, the two are Toralei's cousins and the three werecats are in band named "The Hissfits". They also have distinct personalities; Purrsephone is grunge and rock-n-roll, while Meowlody is sweet but sassy.

=== River Styxx ===
River Styxx (voiced by Ashley Peterson) is the daughter of the Grim Reaper. She dresses in a "pastel goth" fashion. River has purple skin which is transparent on her lower limbs so that her bones are visible. She has a pet raven skeleton named Cawtion. River carries a staff instead of a scythe. She was presented by Monster High designer Garrett Sander at the 2014 San Diego Comic-Con.

=== Robecca Steam ===
Robecca Steam (voiced by Julie Maddalena Kliewer) is the daughter of British mad scientist Hexicah Steam. She has curly blue and black hair and metallic bronze skin that shows rivets and plates as with a robot. Her style is described as steam punk and cutting edge. Her doll appeared at the 2016 San Diego Comic-Con as a dual-doll package with Hexicah Steam. There, she wears a blue and magenta dress with a gear print, and a blue top hat. She is one of the three main characters along with Rochelle Goyle and Venus McFlytrap in the Ghoulfriends series by Gitty Daneshvari. Robecca is named after her designer, Rebecca Shipman.

=== Rochelle Goyle ===
Rochelle Goyle (voiced by Erin Fitzgerald) is the daughter of the Gargoyles. She has a mix of white, pink, and light blue hair, pink eyes, light grey skin, and wings. She is from Scaris. She can be shy sometimes, but is very protective of her friends, but this can tend to get in the way of friends who do not desire her protection. She enjoys sculpting and is fond of architecture. Her pet is a gargoyle griffin named Roux. Rochelle is one of the three main characters of the Ghoulfriends series by Gitty Daneshvari. She appeared at the 2012 New York City Toy Fair, and again in 2014 for the Zombie Shake line. She was a featured character in the Shriekwrecked film.

=== Scarah Screams ===
Scarah Screams (voiced by Erin Fitzgerald in the first appearance, and Paula Bodin (born Rhodes) in later appearances) is the daughter of the Banshee. She has long black hair with greenish-yellow streaks, eyes that have no irises or pupils, and likes to wear clothes that have green in them. She is a bit reserved as whenever she speaks, the other monsters misinterpret it as a bad omen.

Scarah Screams was one of three prototype dolls (alongside Headless Headmistress Bloodgood and Daughter of Arachne) that were featured at the 2011 San Diego Comic-Con. Mattel conducted a poll at the convention as well as online as to which of the three would be made. Scarah won the poll; her official doll was released at San Diego Comic-Con 2012.

=== Silvi Timberwolf ===
Silvi Timberwolf (voiced by Katy Townsend) is the daughter of a gray werewolf from Rotland. She appears in the movie Electrified, and is the guitarist of a punk band, Howling Thunder and Frigthening, she formed with Raythe and Venus.

=== Sirena Von Boo ===
Sirena Von Boo (voiced by Paula Bodin) is a hybrid monster: her father is a ghost and her mother is a mermaid. She has purple and blue hair, white pearlescent skin, and silver mermaid tail that is black near the tip. She is sometimes described as an "air fin" (airhead) because she loves to daydream and follow her imagination. She has a drifting personality. She enjoys hunting for treasure in the sea and frequenting antique shops on land. Her Freaky Fusion doll debuted in 2014.

=== Skelita Calaveras ===
Skelita Calaveras (voiced by Laura Bailey in most projects, Jessica Darrow in the 2022 TV series) is the calaca daughter of Los Eskeletos. She is from Hexico, and speaks Spanish. Her favorite activity is anything having to do with the Día de los Muertos festival. She has black hair with red and aquamarine streaks. In the 2013 film, Scaris: City of Frights, Skelita and Jinafire Long are opponents to Clawdeen Wolf.

Skelita's doll was designed by Natalie Villegas. She has been a frequently searched item among U.S. states that have a strong Latino presence. A doll version where she is only shown as a skeleton drew criticism from bloggers and media writers about anorexia and body image. Her doll got a new dress in the 2016 film special, Welcome to Monster High. Skelita's Halloween costume was put on hazard warnings in 2013. However, later Halloween costume releases have become popular and mentioned by various media in the U.S. and around the world.

In the 2022 series, Skelita dreams of becoming a fashion designer, like her abuela (grandmother) was in her youth. She tends to get “feelings in her bones” if she feels like something good or bad is about to happen. This causes her to shake and literally fall apart.

=== Spectra Vondergeist ===
Spectra Vondergeist (voiced by Erin Fitzgerald in most projects, Valeria Rodriguez in the 2022 TV series) is the daughter of the Ghosts. She has purple hair, pale white skin, and blue eyes. She floats through walls and floors, capturing information on her coffin-shaped phone, and writing regularly to a "Ghostly Gossip" blog, which often gets entirely the wrong impression from things she overhears and sees. She has a pet ferret named Rhuen. Spectra was designed by Monster High creator, Garrett Sander. Her doll was released in 2011.

In the 2022 reboot, Spectra is the descendant of a family of haunting ghosts. Growing up in the spooky side of Hauntlywood with her "ghoul-ma" (grandmother), she is determined to live up to her family name by becoming a natural at scaring others.

=== Toralei Stripe ===
Toralei (voiced by America Young in most appearances, Paloma Rodriguez thereafter, Alexa Khan in the 2022 TV series, portrayed by Salena Qureshi in the live-action films) is the 15-year-old daughter of the werecat, on the first of her nine lives. In most of the Monster High franchise, she takes an antagonistic role as the "mean girl": overconfident, sarcastic and cruel, taking special delight in embarrassing and competing with Cleo. She is portrayed as an orange werecat with black tiger-like stripes, green eyes, and pierced ears.

According to Spectra's investigations, Toralei was an abandoned kitten who learned to steal and be crafty to survive. She was eventually caught and wound up in juvenile detention where she met her twin cat sisters/new gang members Purrsephone and Meowlody. Upon their admission to Monster High, Toralei made it her goal to rule the school. She has a pet saber-tooth tiger cub named Sweet Fang.

In the 2022 reboot, Toralei is from England. She still takes an antagonistic role, wanting Clawdeen to leave Monster High due to her human blood. She is also manipulative, as she blackmailed Draculaura and Lagoona to do what she says, or else she would expose their biggest secrets to the whole school. Her mother Catarina Stripe became the leader of the werebeasts after trapping Selena Wolf, the former leader, in Beheme; she constantly ignores her daughter by favoring her work over her. Toralei defies her mom because of her actions; she helps her classmates free Selena from Beheme, and eventually becomes their ally. The live-action sequel introduces her as having returned from studying a year abroad in Scaris.

=== Treesa Thornwillow ===
Treesa Thornwillow (voiced by Caitlin Prennace) is a plant monster and the sister of Thorna Thornwillow. She first appeared in the web series Monster High: Adventures of the Ghoul Squad.

=== Twyla Boogeyman ===
Twyla Boogeyman (voiced by Jonquil Goode in most appearances, Kayla Cromer in the 2022 TV series) is the daughter of the Boogey Man. She has purple skin, violet eyes and mint green hair with purple highlights. She is very shy and likes to sleep and hide under people's beds. She debuted in the 2013 film special, 13 Wishes. She was among the 13 Wishes dolls that won the TimeToPlayMag.com People's Play Award for Fashion Dolls / America's Wishlist in 2013. The doll line to accompany the 2013 film special, "13 Wishes" were also nominated for Toy Industry Association's Girl Toy of the Year in 2014.

In the 2022 reboot, Twyla is autistic and sensitive to loud sounds. She loves to read history books, and often does so in the school's library, which is her safe place, and she is overcoming her fears of having to grow up. Her powers allow her to enter other people's dreams and manipulate shadows. She is also Manny Taur's love interest.

=== Vandala Doubloons ===
Vandala Doubloons (voiced by Haviland Stillwell) is the daughter of a Pirate Ghost. She has aqua blue and white hair, pink eyes, light aqua skin, and a pink wooden peg leg. She has a pet cuttlefish named Aye. Her debut was in the 2015 film Haunted as a Haunted High student that is rescued from detention, and later transfers to Monster High. Her doll was presented at the 2014 San Diego Comic-Con.

=== Venus McFlytrap ===
Venus McFlytrap (voiced by Julie Maddalena in most projects, Rutina Wesley in the 2022 TV series) is the fifteen-year-old Scottish-American daughter of a male Plant Monster. She dresses in what she calls "eco punk". She is a strong-advocate for environmental issues and sometimes she blows pollen that persuades monsters to her cause. Her pet is a Venus flytrap named Chewlian. She has green skin, blue eyes with green dots, and a half shaved head with pink hair with green highlights.

Venus is one of the three main characters of the Ghoulfriends series by Gitty Daneshvari.

In the 2022 reboot, Venus is African-American. Born and raised in Boo York, she runs her own smoothie business at Dracula's Scare-adise Resort.

=== Viperine Gorgon ===
Viperine Gorgon (voiced by Yeni Alvarez) is a gorgon daughter of Stheno, whose sister is Medusa. She works as a makeup artist in Hauntlywood and is originally from Barcelgrona. She has pink hair, underneath which is a nest of vipers. She and Deuce Gorgon are cousins. She debuted in the 2014 film Frights, Camera, Action. Viperine's doll was designed by Natalie Villegas, and was released as part of the film's characters.

=== Wydowna Spider ===
Wydowna Spider (voiced by Erin Fitzgerald) is the daughter of Arachne, a humanoid spider monster. She has bright red hair, dark skin, six arms and multiple red eyes. She is good friends with Ghoulia Yelps and is involved in various creative projects including illustrating and sewing. Although she can multi-task, sometimes it burns her out. She and Ghoulia have been working on a comic book series called Power Ghouls where she stars as a fictional superhero Webarella. She debuted in the 2016 film, Monster High: Great Scarrier Reef.

Wydowna was designed by Monster High creator Garrett Sander. She was originally introduced as "Daughter of Arachne" at the 2011 San Diego Comic-Con. She was one of three possible prototypes in which participants could vote to be made into a doll. She made her official debut at the 2013 San Diego Comic-Con with her Webarella costume.

=== Zomby Gaga ===
Zomby Gaga was designed by Lady Gaga's sister Natali Germanotta and the doll was released on 2 October 2016 as part of Mattel's partnership with Lady Gaga's Born This Way Foundation. She has pink hair styled in a high ponytail, and wears a black tuxedo and dark sunglasses; her style was based on Lady Gaga's character in the "Born This Way" music video. One of her life goals is to spread love to the world.

=== Headless Headmistress Bloodgood ===
Headless Headmistress Bloodgood (voiced by Laura Bailey in most appearances, Debra Wilson in the 2022 TV series; portrayed by Marci T. House in the live-action films) is the daughter of the Headless Horseman and is in charge of the students at Monster High where she also teaches Trigular Calcometry 101. Like her name implies, she can take off her head whenever it pleases her. She rides her horse Nightmare throughout the school halls and uses horse analogies when she feels it is appropriate. Bloodgood is a good friend of Abbey Bominable's parents and lets Abbey stay at her home during the school week.

In the live-action television films and the 2022 reboot, she is African-American and is called just Headmistress Bloodgood.

== Mansters ==
The following male characters in Monster High are referred to as Mansters: (Note: This list show 11 Mansters from the now-defunct official Monster High website instead of 12 because Jekyll and Hyde have two different designs. Group pets and parents under those particular characters.)

=== Clawd Wolf ===
Clawd Wolf (voiced by Ogie Banks in most projects (credited as Marcus Griffin in the film specials "13 Wishes" in 2013 and "Frights, Camera, Action" in 2014), Yuri Lowenthal in the webisode "Fur Will Fly", and Jonathan Melo in the 2022 TV series) is the son of a werewolf who is also the seventeen-year-old brother of Clawdeen, Howleen, and Clawdia. He dated Cleo prior to Frankie attending Monster High in the dolls' diaries when he was struck by one of C.A. Cupid's arrows. Eventually, the magic wore off and he broke up with Cleo, who began dating Deuce. Clawd is the Big Monster on Campus and plays on the casketball team with Deuce. He has a pet gargoyle bulldog named Rockseena.

In the 2022 reboot, Clawd is Clawdeen's long-lost brother. He was born while his mother was trapped in Beheme, where time flows differently; resulting in him being older than Clawdeen. Like Clawdeen, Clawd is also now Afro-Latino, except he can speak more English and Spanish interchangeably than her.

=== Deuce Gorgon ===
Deuce Gorgon (voiced by Yuri Lowenthal in the first two volumes of the web series, Cam Clarke for the first half of Volume 3, Evan Smith for the other half and continuing to Volumes 4 and 5, Tony Revolori in the 2022 TV series, portrayed by Case Walker in the live-action films) is the son of the gorgon Medusa. Like his mother, he has snakes for hair, which he styles in a "snake-hawk". He is 16 years old and hopes to get his driver's license soon. He is a member of the casketball team. He also loves to cook and is quite a skilled chef, but he is too self-conscious to showcase his culinary ability to anyone. Deuce inherited his mother's ability to turn people into stone, though he has been able to control the effect so that it lasts for only about twenty-four hours. His pet is a two-tailed rat which he named Perseus after Perseus, who Medusa clashed with in her past.

In the 2022 reboot, Deuce was raised by two moms, Medusa and the siren Lyra, with Medusa having very high expectations for him to succeed in school. He also has six older sisters, with two of them being Stheno and Euryale. He wears a hat to hide the snakes on his head, each of which can now speak and embody the seven sins. Unlike his previous incarnations, this version of Deuce is not in a relationship with Cleo de Nile, as they broke up deciding they are better as friends.

In the live-action films, he is stated to be the first gorgon to attend Monster High and that other monsters fear gorgons because of their snake venom and stone stares, so he covers his hair in a cap from which the snakes occasionally slip out, and he wears sunglasses at all times to protect others. In the first film, he broke up with Cleo over the summer due to her egocentric behavior and is Clawdeen Wolf's love interest.

=== Finnegan Wake ===
Finnegan Wake (voiced by Cole Massie in the TV series) is a merman who is the son of a mermaid. He is shown to be unable to walk on land which leads the ghouls to underestimate his abilities. Finnegan is a daredevil and thrill seeker who does not let his disability get in the way of what he wants to do.

He was brought back for the 2022 reboot. Finnegan is a guitarist who is passionate about rock and roll. He is Spectra's love interest.

=== Garrott DuRoque ===
Garrott DuRoque (voiced by Evan Smith) is a French gargoyle from Scaris, France and Rochelle Goyle's boyfriend. He now comes in a doll two-pack with Rochelle. His flowers are his "pets" and he is a perfectionist.

=== Gillington "Gil" Webber ===
Gillington "Gil" Webber (voiced by Yuri Lowenthal in the first two volumes of the web series, Evan Smith in later volumes and the films from Fright On! onwards, Miles Brown in the 2022 TV series) is the son of two freshwater-river monsters and is Lagoona Blue's boyfriend. GGil is one of the top members on the swim team alongside Lagoona. When on land, Gil has to wear a water-filled helmet over his head in order to breathe, though "Hatch Me if You Can" and the Gloom Beach arc shows that he can be on land for a short period of time without it.

In the 2022 reboot, Gil was accepted into Monster High later in the school year, and is Lagoona's love at first sight.

=== Heath Burns ===
Heath Burns (voiced by Yuri Lowenthal in the first volume of the web series, Cam Clarke from the 2nd volume onwards, Alexander Polinsky in the 2022 TV series, portrayed by Justin Derickson in the live-action films) is the teenage son of two Fire Elementals. Heath primarily serves as the comic relief, being the butt of many physical jokes and a class clown.

In the 2022 reboot, he is now the son of the fire elemental Hades Burns and an unnamed female fire elemental. He is very motivative to his friends and is a passionate environmentalist.

=== Invisi Billy ===
Invisi Billy (voiced by Evan Smith) is the son of the Invisible Man. Invisi Billy can be seen as a bit of a prankster, but he can be kind and sweet, as in helping Rochelle Goyle with her dance in "Fright Dance". He loves drama, particularly special effects which are his forte. His girlfriend is Scarah Screams (who is also his BFF) as they got together in the webisode "Scarah-Voyant" thanks to Frankie.

=== Jackson Jekyll / Holt Hyde ===
Jackson Jekyll (voiced by Cindy Robinson) is a normie boy at Monster High, and enjoys sports (particularly casketball) and video games. Jackson is the son of "Dr. Jekyll", though it is unclear if this is his father, though in the books, Dr. Jekyll is his mother, Sydney Jekyll. His diary implies the original Dr. Jekyll and Mr. Hyde were his grandfather and his mother seems to possess the ability to shift. In the web series, Jackson is related to Heath Burns (they are cousins) but through which parent has not been clearly explained.

Holt Hyde (also voiced by Cindy Robinson) is the alter-ego version of Jackson Jekyll and the son of Mr. and Mrs. Hyde, who Jackson turns into when loud music plays. His diary explains that the trigger is likely to change several times as he ages before finally settling. Holt on the other hand seems to be more fire elemental than normie. His skin is bright blue, his eyes are red and he has fiery-colored hair.

Jackson and Holt share a pet chameleon named Crossfade.

=== Manny Taur ===
Manny Taur (voiced by Audu Paden in most projects, Jordan Coleman in the 2022 TV series) is the son of the Minotaur. He is a half-bull half-human in appearance; he has blonde hair, a ring on his nose and wears a red shirt with a labyrinth printed on it, along with jeans pants and brown shoes. Manny initially debuted as a school bully at Monster High, usually picking on Jackson Jekyll. After an encounter with Abbey, he changed his ways; although he stopped bullying people, he can be still gruff to others.

In the 2022 reboot, Manny is a calm and gentle monster and he loves to read and is great at solving puzzles. His smarts rival that of Draculaura's who often competes with him to become top student. This version of Manny is Twyla Boogeyman's love interest.

=== Neighthan Rot ===
Neighthan Rot (voiced by Josey Montana McCoy) is one of the new "hybrid" students of Monster High. He is the son of a zombie (father) and a unicorn (mother). He has long black hair with blue, yellow, and red highlights in a ponytail, and he wears a colorful shirt and pants whose color splash patterns seem remincient of anatomical models. Neighthan is somewhat clumsy, but he is a social monster who loves hanging out with his beast friends. He does not like monsters judging other monsters based on their appearances. He has the ability to heal thanks to his unicorn horn. He has romantic feelings for Frankie Stein, which seems to be mutual. Neightan was designed by Garrett Sander.

=== Porter Geiss ===
Porter Geiss (nicknamed Paintergeist) (voiced by Todd Haberkorn) is a character who debuted in the TV/film special "Haunted". He is the son of the Poltergeist and is an expert artist where he often gets in trouble with Haunted High's Hall Moanitors. Porter falls in love with Spectra Vondergeist in "Haunted," but decides to continue attending Haunted High instead.

=== Romulus ===
Romulus (voiced by Cam Clarke in most projects, Scott Menville in the 2022 TV series) is a werewolf who used to attend Crescent Moon High before the school merged with Monster High. Romulus is proud, highly influential but also timid and sheepish. Through circumstances, he has become the mentor of Howleen Wolf.

In the 2022 TV series, Romulus has purple hair and is the leader of Monster High's Werewolf Council, formed by him, Barkimedes and Howleen. Romulus is a mean-spirited jerk with a rude attitude. He does not like Clawdeen due to her human side and has tried to trick her multiple times with Barkimedes' help, but always fails. In the season one finale, "The Monster Way", he, like the rest of the werebeasts at Monster High, respects Clawdeen as the new wereleader, but in the second season, he is a candidate in the wereruler elections, determined to make all werebeasts reign supreme.

=== Sloman "Slo-Mo" Mortovitch ===
Sloman "Slo-Mo" Mortovitch (vocal effects provided by Audu Paden) is a Russian-American zombie who was originally addressed as Moe "Slow Moe" Deadovitch instead throughout the series, before any dolls were released and before it was officially addressed on Monster High's website in the description of "Flowers for Slo Moe". He is Ghoulia's official boyfriend.

== Other characters ==
=== Main characters from affiliated book or movie series ===
The following characters are exclusive to the book or movie adaptions of this franchise:

==== Melody Carver ====
Melody Carver is the co-protagonist of the Monster High novels by Lisi Harrison. She and her family are from Beverly Hills and moved to Salem, Oregon to help with Melody's asthma. Melody has just recovered from rhinoplasty that was meant to help her with her breathing, but is implied to have been mostly to please her parents' family image. Melody's family is neighbors with Jackson Jekyll, whom Melody eventually dates. Melody is the one who reveals the truth behind Jackson's blackouts through a recording on her iPhone. Unfortunately, she forgets to delete it and it gets in the hands of Bekka Madden, a RAD hater. This video leads to the RADs community becoming exposed, Melody forming the NUDIs (Normies Uncool with Discriminating Idiots), and a documentary on their secret lives. At the end of the second novel, Melody learns that she is the daughter of Marina, a siren. Later on, Melody develops the ability to persuade people to do whatever she asks with her voice.

=== Appearing in Generation 2 ===
==== Count Dracula ====
Count Dracula (voiced by Michael Sorich from 2016-2018, Ken Marino in the TV series, portrayed by Steve Valentine in the live-action films) is the father of Draculaura.

In the Generation 2 projects, Count Dracula is a teacher at Monster High.

The 2022 reboot depicts Count Dracula as a member of the Monster Council. When he learns about Draculaura's works in witchcraft, he keeps quiet about it to Headmistress Bloodgood and the other monsters and coming up with a cover-up when it was thought that Toralei Stripe was the one doing witchcraft.

=== Appearing in Generation 3 ===
==== Apollo Wolf ====
Apollo Wolf (voiced by Delbert Hunt in the 2022 TV series, portrayed by Scotch Ellis Loring in the live action films) is a human and Clawdeen's father. Although humans and monsters are considered enemies, Apollo and female werewolf Selena fell in love and had Clawdeen. In the 2022 TV series, Apollo is a monster researcher, which led to him meeting Selena. When Clawdeen was 5, Selena got trapped in Beheme, but he did not know it; he searched for her ever since but with no success, so he raised Clawdeen by himself, not telling her about her monster heritage until after her 15th birthday. He later met his long-lost son Clawd who was in Beheme with Selena. By the end of season one, Apollo is reunited with Selena.

In the live-action films, Apollo is raising Clawdeen on his own following Selena's death. He was unsure on letting Clawdeen go to Monster High, but allowed to realizing she wants to find the place she belongs.

==== Barkimedes ====
Barkimedes (voiced by Darius Marquis Johnson) is a werewolf student at Monster High and member of Monster High's Werewolf Council alongside Romulus and Howleen. Barkimedes is dimwitted and cannot keep things to himself, much to his pack mates' annoyance. Romulus used to gain help from him to trick Clawdeen multiple times, but always fails. In the episode "Moonlit Fieldtrip", he befriends one of Clawdeen's human schoolmates, Buddy, who promises to keep his werewolf identity a secret.

==== Blair, Buddy, and Raine ====
Blair, Buddy, and Raine (voiced by Courtney Lin, Scott Menville, and Kausar Mohammed respectively) are three human gothic teenagers who attend Clawdeen's former human school. Blair is a short girl with light skin, white hair and brown eyes. Buddy is a tall boy with big built, tanned skin, blue hair and brown eyes. Raine is a tall and lean non-binary teen with tanned skin, green hair and brown eyes. They have always bullied Clawdeen for her interest in monsters and call her "monster girl". In "Case of the Moondays", it is shown that they are monster hunters, although this was more of Blair's interest. In "Moonlit Fieldtrip", Buddy befriends Barkimedes, keeping his werewolf identity a secret.

==== Catarina Stripe ====
Catarina Stripe (voiced by Mary Jane Wells) is a werecat who is the mother of Toralei Stripe. She became the leader of the werecreatures following the disappearance of Selena Wolf and has since been neglectful towards her daughter. The Boo Crew have their final showdown with her in "The Monster Way", in which she used a talisman with the powers of all the monsters to rule all monsterkind before she is defeated by Clawdeen's sacrifice. When Selena Wolf returned from Beheme, Catarina was deposed as leader of the werecreatures as Clawdeen is sworn in to that role by her mother.

==== Coach Thunderbird ====
Coach Thunderbird (voiced by Tamara Podemski) is an anthropomorphic thunderbird and the fearleading coach at Monster High. She has long dark brown hair which she wears in two braids with red, white, and blue beaded hair clips. Coach Thunderbird has hazel eyes, blue eyeshadow and two long white and brown feathers on the top of her head. Thunderbird is enthusiastic and cheerful. She encourages the students, even when their performances are not very impressive.

==== Demi Boovais ====
Demi Boovais (portrayed by Kyra Leroux) is introduced in the second live-action movie. She is a scatterbrained but friendly ghost-human hybrid, who looks up to Clawdeen. Demi formed the Hu/Mon (human-monster) club.

==== Edward "Eddy" Hyde ====
Eddy Hyde was a half-human half-monster introduced in the first live-action film, who used to attend Monster High in the past and was classmates with Selena Wolf and Dracula. Because humans were considered a threat to monsters, Hyde had to keep his human side hidden. At some point, he had a secret lab where he created a formula that could transform him into a full-blooded monster. Before he could test it, his human side was discovered and he was expelled from Monster High. He married a female Minotaur whose maiden name is Komos and they had a son whom they named after him. Hyde was eventually killed by human hunters before he can make plans to reclaim his formula. His son Eddy Hyde Jr. worked to complete his father's formula.

==== Edward "Eddy" Hyde Jr./Mr. Komos ====
Mr. Komos (portrayed by Kyle Selig) was a half-human half-Minotaur introduced in the first live-action film, who went to Monster High to work as a teacher. He is considered the "cool teacher" and offers Clawdeen guiadance and advice for how to fit in at Monster High. Later in the film, he is revealed to be Hyde's son Eddy Hyde Jr. and took his mother's maiden name so no one would discover his connection to his father and enlisted as a teacher Monster High to find his father's formula and use it to destroy Monster High and then the humans for revenge. The formula transformed him into a big full-blooded monster with the ability to absorb a monster's powers, taking Draculaura's and Deuce's powers, but then Clawdeen, using Cleo's ICoffin, made Komos look into his own reflection while he was using Deuce's stone stare, petrifying him and returning Draculaura and Deuce's powers.

==== Ellis Ghould ====
Ellis Ghould (portrayed by Bonale Fambrini) is introduced in the second live-action film. He is a human witch who befriends Draculaura.

==== Goobert ====
Goobert (voiced by Iris Menas) is a slime monster and student at Monster High. His whole body is made of green ectoplasm, making his organs visible to the eyes of the others, he has four eyes and he wears an orange cap. Goobert is cool, calm and does not get mad when monsters get stuck on his ectoplasm.

==== Greigor ====
Greigor (portrayed by Ajay Banks) appeared in the first live-action movie. He is an igor (character) and the custodian of Monster High. Greigor has green skin, sunken eyes, and a hump on his back. He is hard-working, without patience for rude management.

==== Kuma ====
Kuma (voiced by Sekai Murashige) is an onikuma and student at Monster High. He resembles a brown-furred bear Yōkai. Kuma found Monster High thanks to his instincts, alongside Clawdeen. He attacked the students, but Clawdeen calmed him down by tickling him. After this, Kuma was accepted into Monster High. In his first episodes, he just groaned and made bear sounds. Kuma made his speaking debut in "Creature Clash" where he learned how to speak English prior to this episode. Kuma is part of the Fear Squad alongside Draculaura, Clawdeen, Toralei, Clawd, and Iris.

==== Mrs. O'Shriek ====
Mrs. O'Shriek (voiced by Salli Saffioti) is a banshee and teacher at Monster High. She has soft lilac skin, red curly hair, eyes that have slit-shaped pupils and yellow sclera and wears glasses. Her outfit resembles the hippie fashion, she wears sandals, a comfortable dress, has an abundance of jewelry topped with three flowers in her hair. O'Shriek teaches communications, applied art and Haunted Theater. She is enthusiastic and encouraging to her students.

==== Selena Wolf ====
Selena Wolf (voiced by Kate del Castillo in the 2022 TV series) is a werewolf and Clawdeen's mother, who attended Monster High when she was a teenager. Although humans and monsters are enemies, she and human Apollo fell in love and had Clawdeen. In the 2022 TV series, Selena was the leader of the werebeasts and received the moonclaw talisman. When Clawdeen was 5, Selena had to leave for a task for the Monster Council and got imprisoned in another dimension named Beheme, a land inhabited by dangerous creatures, by Catarina Stripe; whilst there, she discovered she was expecting her son Clawd. As the new holder of the moonclaw, Clawdeen discovered Monster High, and discovered her werewolf heritage and the truth about her mother. After Clawdeen brought Clawd to Monster High, the two siblings were able to find the other talismans with the help of their friends and, in the season one finale, brought Selena back to the monster world.

In the live-action films, she died at some point due to unknown circumstances.

==== Skelly Vonderbone ====
Skelly Vonderbone (voiced by Trixie Mattel) is a skeleton monster and a famous singer. She also has her own dancing video game, and is Ghoulia Yelps' hero. She has black hair with colorful streaks, and wears a one-piece outfit with a skirt and broad shoulder pads. Skelly's signature dance move is the "knee knock", which she acquired to overcome her stage fright, and her hit song is "Turn it Inside Out".

==== Skunkrates "Teez" ====
Skunkrates (voiced by Darius Marquis Johnson) is a wereskunk student at Monster High. He is shown laid back and level-headed, he also showed himself to be a bit of a conspiracy theorist, believing in evil groups like the Humanati and refusing to go by his government name, preferring to be called “Teez” instead.

==== Zamara Prue ====
Zamara Prue (portrayed by Ana Ortiz) also known as Queen Zamara or Z, is the main antagonist of the second live-action movie. She is a witch and the Queen of the Salem Coven, who tried to use Draculaura to destroy the vampires once and for all.
