= Ogie Banks =

American voice actor

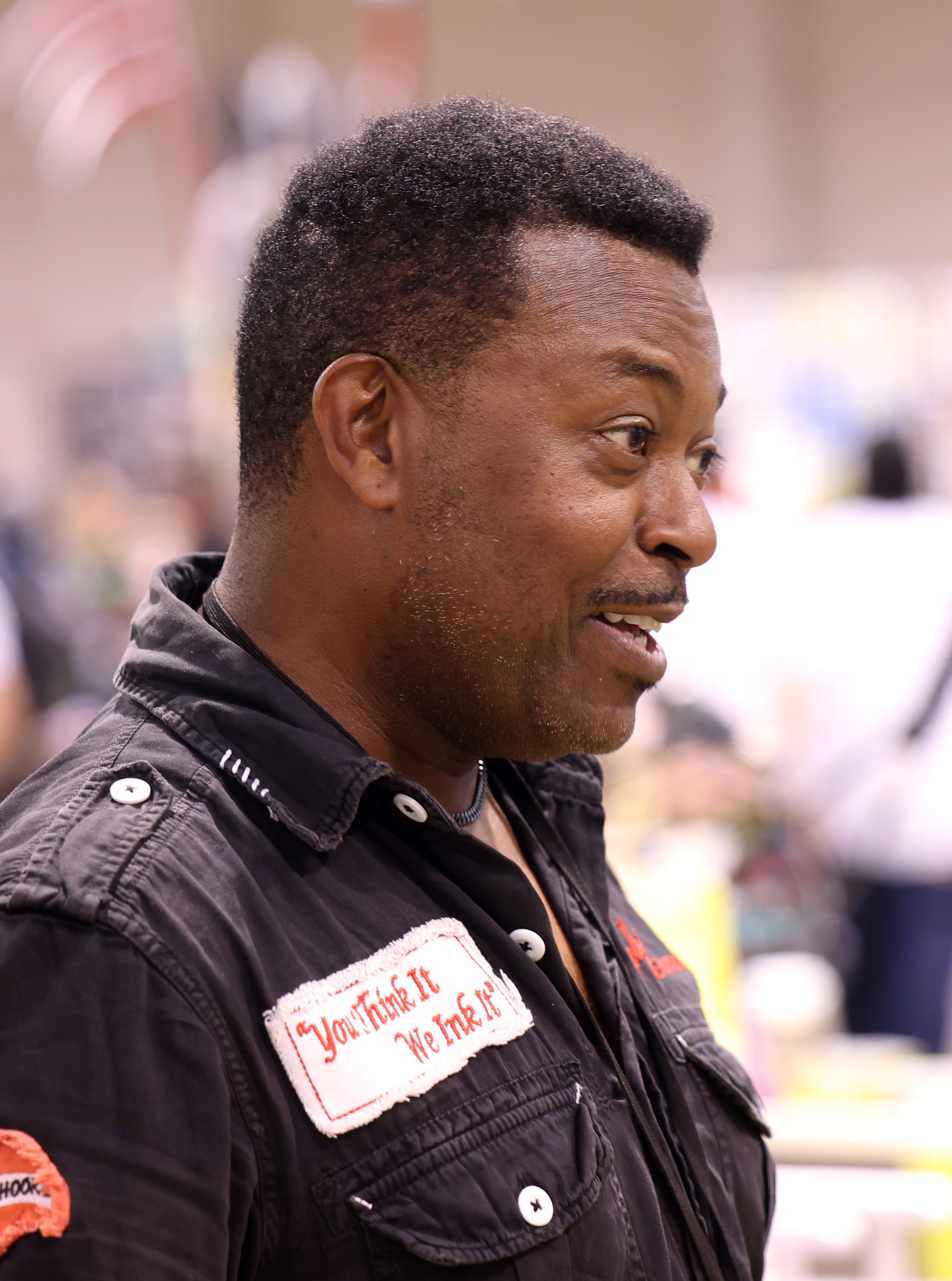
- Banks in 2026
- Born: Ogie Henry Banks III; June 13, 1973 (age 53); Los Angeles, California, U.S.
- Other names: Ogie Banks III, O.G. Banks, Hank Banks, Henry Banks, Marcus Griffin
- Occupation: Voice actor
- Years active: 1990–present

Ogie Henry Banks III (born June 13, 1973) is an American voice actor, best known for his roles as Clawd Wolf in Monster High and Luke Cage and Miles Morales in Ultimate Spider-Man. He also voices Dylan in the Bratz franchise and Darui in Naruto.

== Filmography ==
=== Anime ===
| Year | Title | Role | Notes |
|---|---|---|---|
| 1994 | Marmalade Boy | Kei Tsuchiya | 2 episodes |
| 2005 | Naruto | Karashi | 5 episodes |
| 2007 | Highlander: The Search for Vengeance | Joe | Credited as Hank Banks |
| 2008 | Stitch! | Bojo (Masterful One) | Two episodes: "Bojo" and "Stitch vs. Hämsterviel Pt. I" |
| 2009 | Huntik: Secrets and Seekers | Additional Voices | Episode: "The Golden Asp" |
| 2010 | Mobile Suit Gundam Unicorn | Marco, additional voices | Episode: "Day of the Unicorn" |
| 2010–2017 | Naruto: Shippuden | Omoi, Darui, Allied Shinobi, Nokizaru Troops | 28 episodes |
| 2011 | Naruto the Movie: Blood Prison | Omoi, Tora | |
| 2014 | Mobile Suit Gundam Unicorn 7 | Additional voices | |
| 2015 | Boruto: Naruto the Movie | Darui | |
| 2017 | MFKZ | Additional voices | |
| 2018–2020 | Baki | Mohamed Ali Jr., additional voices | 17 episodes |
| 2019 | Cannon Busters | Fake Philly, additional voices | 2 episodes |

=== Television ===
| Year | Title | Role | Notes |
|---|---|---|---|
| 1990 | America's Most Wanted: America Fights Back | Skateboard Punk | Episode: "Tony Playboy, Lance Bedgood" |
| 1994 | Mighty Morphin Power Rangers | Zane / Black Dark Ranger | 2 episodes; uncredited |
| 1999 | Any Day Now | | Episode: "You Promise? I Promise"; credited as Ogie Banks III |
| 2002 | ChalkZone | Cruncho, Rickhala | Voice, 2 episodes |
| 2002 | Fillmore! | Carter | Voice, episode: "A Cold Day at X" |
| 2002 | Homeward Bound | | Television film |
| 2003 | My Life as a Teenage Robot | George, Carver, Man | Voice, episode: "The Boy Who Cried Robot"; credited as Ogie Banks III |
| 2003 | Rugrats | Token Seller | Voice, episode: "Diapies and Dragons" |
| 2003–2005 | Clifford's Puppy Days | Zo | Voice, 6 episodes |
| 2004 | Phil of the Future | Frog | Voice, episode: "Doggie Day-Care" |
| 2004–2005 | Fatherhood | Justin | Voice, 23 episodes |
| 2004–2007 | All Grown Up! | Edwin, Bus Driver, Efram, Max, Troy | Voice, 5 episodes |
| 2005–2006, 2021 | Bratz | Dylan | Voice, 8 episodes; credited as Ogie Banks III |
| 2006 | W.I.T.C.H. | Peter Cook | Voice, 2 episodes |
| 2006 | Codename: Kids Next Door - Operation Z.E.R.O. | Sector Z Numuh 1.0 - Bruce | Voice, television film |
| 2006 | Codename: Kids Next Door | Numbuh 5000 / Leopold Lincoln | Voice, episode: "Operation W.H.I.T.E.H.O.U.S.E." |
| 2006 | Class of 3000 | Sloppy Jack, various voices | Voice, 4 episodes |
| 2006–2008 | The Replacements | Skater, Rollerskater | Voice, 2 episodes |
| 2008 | Psi-Kix | Hammer | Voice |
| 2008 | Studio DC: Almost Live | The Announcer | Voice |
| 2009–2010 | Gormiti: The Lords of Nature Return! | Lucas | Voice, 17 episodes |
| 2011 | Monster High | Clawd Wolf | Voice, episode: "Scream Building" |
| 2011 | Meter Men | Washington Beans | Television film |
| 2011 | Monster High: Fright On! | Clawd Wolf | Voice, television film |
| 2011–2013 | Secret Millionaires Club | Radley | Voice, 14 episodes; credited as Hank Banks |
| 2012 | Monster High: Why Do Ghouls Fall in Love? | Clawd Wolf | Voice, television film; credited as Ogie Banks III |
| 2012 | Monster High: Escape from Skull Shores | Clawd Wolf | Voice, television film; credited as Ogie Banks III |
| 2012 | Monster High: Ghouls Rule | Clawd Wolf | Voice, television film; credited as Hank Banks |
| 2012–2014 | NFL Rush Zone | Tua, Funky DJ, Ravens Rusher | Voice, 29 episodes |
| 2012–2017 | Ultimate Spider-Man | Power Man / Luke Cage, Miles Morales / Kid Arachnid, additional voices | Voice, Main role |
| 2013 | Monster High: Scaris, City of Frights | Clawd Wolf | Voice, television film; credited as Hank Banks |
| 2013 | Monster High: From Fear to Eternity | Clawd Wolf | Voice, television film |
| 2013 | Ben 10: Omniverse | Zak Saturday | Voice, episode: "T.G.I.S." |
| 2015 | Be Cool, Scooby-Doo! | Tyson, Soldier #1, Guard | Voice, episode: "Area 51 Adjacent" |
| 2016 | Fresh Beat Band of Spies | Alley | Voice, episode: "Sneaky Sneakers" |
| 2016 | Marseille | Fred | Voice, 7 episodes; English dub |
| 2016 | Barbie: Dreamtopia | Jonah Rabbit, Strawberry Bear #2 | Voice, television film |
| 2016 | The Lion Guard | Haya | Voice, episode: "Too Many Termites" |
| 2016 | Lastman | Additional voices | Episode: "Encaisser et pas mourir" |
| 2017 | Ben 10 | Ryan Sez, Simon Sez | Voice, episode: "Battle at Biggie Box" |
| 2017 | Barbie Dreamtopia | Strawberry Bear #2, Jonah, Locksley | Voice, 6 episodes |
| 2017 | Valt the Wonder Deer | Valt | Voice, main role (52 episodes) |
| 2017–2018 | Stretch Armstrong and the Flex Fighters | Ricardo Perez / Omni-Mass, King Nerd, additional voices | Voice, 24 episodes |
| 2018 | Subway Surfers: The Animated Series | Fresh | Voice |
| 2018 | Mecard | Kangshi, Wingtok | Voice |
| 2018–2019 | Spider-Man | Barkley Blitz, Abraham Brown, Passenger #1 | Voice, 4 episodes |
| 2018–2019 | Barbie Dreamhouse Adventures | Various voices | Voice, 20 episodes |
| 2019–2020 | The Loud House | Spencer, Swim Team Boy #1, Leo | Voice, 3 episodes |
| 2020 | Droners | Enki | Voice |
| 2020–2022 | Muppet Babies | Scooter | Voice, Recurring role |
| 2021–2024 | Ghostforce | Mike Collins/Krush | Voice: English version; Main role |
| 2022 | Spirit Rangers | Brad | Voice, episode: "Not Your Opossum Mascot" |
| 2024 | Lego Marvel Avengers: Mission Demolition | Captain America / Sam Wilson, Coffee Vendor, Soda Suit Vendor | Voice, Disney+ Television special |
| 2025 | Your Friendly Neighborhood Spider-Man | Pizza Shop Owner | Voice, episode: "Amazing Fantasy" |
| 2025 | Lego Marvel Avengers: Strange Tails | Captain America / Sam Wilson | Voice, Disney+ Television special |
| 2026 | Armorsaurs | Dwayne Roberts | 2 episodes |

=== Film ===
| Year | Title | Role | Notes |
|---|---|---|---|
| 1992 | Newsies | Newsies Dancer | Credited as Ogie Banks III |
| 2003 | LeapFrog: The Letter Factory | Letters | Voice, direct-to-video; credited as Ogie Banks III |
| 2004 | Bratz: Starrin' & Stylin' | Dylan | Voice, direct-to-video |
| 2004 | B-Girl | Carlos | Short film |
| 2006 | Bratz: Genie Magic | Dylan | Voice, direct-to-video |
| 2006 | Bratz Babyz | Cameron | Voice, direct-to-video; uncredited |
| 2006 | Bratz: Passion 4 Fashion - Diamondz | Dylan | Voice, direct-to-video; uncredited |
| 2012 | Animen: The Galactic Battle | Sergeant Gator | Voice |
| 2012 | Back to the Sea | Richard | Voice |
| 2012 | Superman vs. The Elite | Terrence Baxter | Voice, direct-to-video |
| 2012 | Monster High: Friday Night Frights | Clawd Wolf | Voice, short film; credited as Hank Banks |
| 2013 | Bratz: Go to Paris the Movie | Dylan | Voice, direct-to-video; credited as Ogie Banks III |
| 2014 | SpaceBear | Mark 16 | Voice, short film |
| 2018 | To Each, Her Own | Additional voices | English dub |
| 2018 | Wheely | Wheely | Voice |
| 2020 | Barbie Princess Adventure | Ned, Ted | Voice |
| 2022 | The Great Wolf Pack: A Call to Adventure | Oliver Raccoon | Voice |

=== Video games ===
| Year | Title | Role | Notes | Source |
|---|---|---|---|---|
| 2001 | Zoog Genius: Math, Science & Technology | Gatherer | | |
| 2003 | Final Fantasy X-2 | Buddy | English version; credited as Ogie Banks III | |
| 2003 | Clifford the Big Red Dog: Phonics | Charley | | |
| 2004 | Men of Valor | Jamie Shephard, Green Beret 2 | Credited as Ogie Banks III | |
| 2005 | Psychonauts | Chops Sweetwind | | |
| 2005 | Bratz: Rock Angelz | Dylan | | |
| 2006 | Saints Row | Warren Williams | Credited as Ogie Banks III | |
| 2006 | Bratz: Forever Diamondz | Dylan | | |
| 2006 | Superman Returns | The Citizens of Metropolis | | |
| 2007 | Bratz: The Movie | Dylan | | |
| 2008 | Lego Batman: The Videogame | Clayface, Mr. Freeze | | |
| 2008 | Saints Row 2 | Additional Characters | | |
| 2009 | Marvel: Ultimate Alliance 2 | Patriot | | |
| 2009 | Operation Flashpoint: Dragon Rising | Delray | Credited as Henry Banks | |
| 2011 | Operation Flashpoint: Red River | Delray | | |
| 2011 | Saints Row: The Third | Pedestrian and Character Voices | | |
| 2012 | Naruto Shippuden: Ultimate Ninja Storm Generations | Darui | English version | |
| 2012 | Starhawk | Rifters | | |
| 2012 | Monster High: Skultimate Roller Maze | Clawd Wolf | | |
| 2013 | Naruto Shippuden: Ultimate Ninja Storm 3 | Darui | English version | |
| 2013 | Marvel Heroes | Miles Morales | | |
| 2013 | Saints Row IV | Warren Williams | | |
| 2014 | Naruto Shippuden: Ultimate Ninja Storm Revolution | Darui | English version | |
| 2014 | Disney Infinity: Marvel Super Heroes | Power Man | | |
| 2014 | Skylanders: Trap Team | Blackout | | |
| 2014 | Guilty Gear Xrd | Venom | | |
| 2015 | Disney Infinity 3.0 | Power Man | | |
| 2015 | Fallout 4 | Holt Combes, Nelson Latimer, Preston Garvey Impersonator | | |
| 2016 | Lego Marvel's Avengers | Luke Cage / Power Man | | |
| 2016 | Final Fantasy XV | Additional Voices | English version | |
| 2017 | Injustice 2 | Firestorm | | |
| 2018 | Naruto to Boruto: Shinobi Striker | Male Voice 7 | English version | |
| 2018 | Red Dead Redemption 2 | The Local Pedestrian Population | Credited as Ogie Banks III | |
| 2019 | Tom Clancy's The Division 2 | Voice | | |
| 2019 | Arcade Spirits | Gavin | | |
| 2019 | Rage 2 | Wellspring Guards, Dreadwood Civilians | | |
| 2020 | Final Fantasy VII Remake | Additional voices | English version | |
| 2020 | The Last of Us: Part II | Additional voices | | |
| 2020 | Deadly Premonition 2: A Blessing in Disguise | Melvin Woods | | |
| 2020 | Möbius Front '83 | Cliff Wells | | |
| 2020 | Spider-Man: Miles Morales | Additional voices | | |
| 2020 | Sam & Max Save the World Remastered | Bosco | | |
| 2021 | Sam & Max Beyond Time and Space Remastered | Bosco | | |
| 2022 | Bratz: Flaunt Your Fashion | Dylan | | |
