= Monster High (web series) =

Web series version of Monster High

- Created by: Garrett Sander
- Voices of: Kate Higgins; Debi Derryberry; Salli Saffioti; Laura Bailey; Yuri Lowenthal
- Country of origin: United States
- Original language: English
- No. of seasons: 6
- No. of episodes: 175

Production
- Executive producer: Audu Paden
- Animators: Wildbrain Entertainment (2010–2013); 6 Point Harness (2013–2015)
- Running time: 2 minutes
- Production companies: Mattel Studios (2010–2013); Mattel Playground Productions (2013–2015)

Original release
- Network: YouTube
- Release: May 5, 2010 – October 30, 2015

Monster High is an American animated web series based on the fashion doll line of the same name created by Mattel, the first adaptation since its launch, which originally aired on YouTube from May 5, 2010, to February 9, 2018.

The series follows a group of teenage children of famous monsters in media and film who attend high school. Along with its feature-length direct-to-video films, this series serves as a platform to launch new doll characters. The web series finished its first run in 2015 with Volume 6, and got rebooted with a long-form 11-minute, 12-episode series order titled the Adventures of the Ghoul Squad. As of July 12, 2018, 189 web series episodes were produced and released – including the reboot series.

== Development ==
The original Monster High dolls were created by Garrett Sander, with illustrations by Kellee Riley and illustrator Glen Hanson. The characters are inspired by monster movies, sci-fi horror, thriller fiction and various other creatures.

The 2D animation was produced by Wildbrain Entertainment during since the mini-series launch until 2013 and 6 Point Harness thereafter, though Top Drawn Animation has been continuously hired by both companies for supportive work after it took over from Caboom. Audio dialogue recordings and music for the web series was done by Salami Studios.

== Release ==
The mini-series premiered on YouTube on 5 May 2010 and ended in 2015 to make way for the release of the origin story film special, "Welcome to Monster High". The mini-series got rebooted in 2016 with a 12-episode order called the Adventures of the Ghoul Squad and aired on YouTube and its sibling outlet, YouTube Kids between 11 August 2017 and 9 February 2018. Episodes were added weekly on Fridays.

== Series overview ==
| Volume | Episodes | Originally released | |
| Volume | Episodes | First released | Last released |
|---|---|---|---|
| 1 | 27 | May 5, 2010 | January 20, 2011 |
| 2 | 36 | February 8, 2011 | November 17, 2011 |
| 3 | 55 | December 8, 2011 | December 26, 2013 |
| 4 | 30 | November 21, 2013 | March 31, 2015 |
| 5 | 10 | October 2, 2014 | April 10, 2015 |
| 6 | 6 | June 19, 2015 | October 30, 2015 |
| Bonus/Promo | 11 | October 3, 2011 | July 19, 2012 |
| Adventures of the Ghoul Squad | 14 | August 19, 2017 | February 9, 2018 |

== Episodes ==
=== Volume 1 (2010–11) ===
| No. overall | No. in volume | Title | Original release date | Ref |
|---|---|---|---|---|
| 1 | 1 | "Jaundice Brothers" | May 5, 2010 | |
The ghouls make a video to persuade the Jaundice Brothers to play at Monster High's homecoming.
| 2 | 2 | "Talon Show" | May 5, 2010 | |
Cleo pulls a nasty spotlight stunt to make herself look better than Clawdeen.
| 3 | 3 | "Fear Squad" | May 5, 2010 | |
Fearleading squad captain, Cleo, gets annoyed when Frankie shows her dance moves.
| 4 | 4 | "Substitute Creature" | May 10, 2010 | |
A new sub at Monster High tries to take Deuce's sunglasses off, claiming that they are a distraction, but end up dismissing everyone from class.
| 5 | 5 | "Party Planners" | May 14, 2010 | |
Frankie tries to plan a sweet 1600 for Draculaura, while Draculaura is planning a sweet 16 days for Frankie but no one wants to come and end up throwing a party for both of them.
| 6 | 6 | "Blue Lagoona" | May 21, 2010 | |
Lagoona draws a dreamy picture of her underwater crush, then loses her Clawculus book.
| 7 | 7 | "Copy Canine" | May 28, 2010 | |
When Clawdeen forgets to study for the Scary Aptitude Test, she sits next to Ghoulia, ready to cheat.
| 8 | 8 | "The Hot Boy" | June 4, 2010 | |
Draculaura is crushing on the hottest guy in school, so Cleo gives her a scary makeover. Will it work?
| 9 | 9 | "Bad Scare Day" | June 11, 2010 | |
When Frankie accidentally puts her bolts on backwards, she causes havoc.
| 10 | 10 | "Photo Finish" | June 18, 2010 | |
The ghouls try to look their best on picture day.
| 11 | 11 | "Cyrano De Ghoulia" | June 25, 2010 | |
Ghoulia has a crush on a zombie named Slo-Mo, so the ghouls try to help her win his heart with their own advice.
| 12 | 12 | "Bad Zituation" | July 9, 2010 | |
The new sugar eyeball gives Frankie a zit.
| 13 | 13 | "Clawditions" | July 16, 2010 | |
Clawdeen and Cleo get in a tussle over the lead for the school play, but an unexpected ghoul takes the part.
| 14 | 14 | "Freedom Fight" | July 23, 2010 | |
Lagoona fights to free the science lab frogs and finds them a surprising new home.
| 15 | 15 | "Totally Busted" | July 30, 2010 | |
Frankie and Cleo are sent to the office after breaking a statue and then try to explain whose fault it really is.
| 16 | 16 | "Freakout Friday" | October 29, 2010 | |
Somehow it is both Friday the 13th and Halloween, causing the most unlucky day possible for the boys and ghouls at Monster High.
| 17 | 17 | "Mad Science Fair" | November 4, 2010 | |
Cleo steals Ghoulia's science project so she can win, but, in the end, Ghoulia gets her revenge.
| 18 | 18 | "Shock and Awesome" | November 11, 2010 | |
After learning that Frankie has never been to the movies, the ghouls are ready to give her the best experience possible. That is until the auditorium system goes down, causing Frankie to help out more than she expected.
| 19 | 19 | "The Good, the Bat, and the Fabulous" | November 22, 2010 | |
Draculaura has not learned the oldest vampire trick, turning into a bat.
| 20 | 20 | "Rumor Run Wild" | November 24, 2010 | |
Cleo wants Clawdeen out of the campaign for Scream Queen, so she spreads unsavory rumors about her which turns into a game of "Pass on the Secret".
| 21 | 21 | "Fur Will Fly" | December 2, 2010 | |
Heath challenges Clawdeen to a race on the wrong day.
| 22 | 22 | "Horrorscope" | December 9, 2010 | |
Draculaura's horrorscope predicts that she will meet the boy of her dreams. So the ghouls try to make it come true.
| 23 | 23 | "Idol Threat" | December 16, 2010 | |
Cleo steals one of her father's idols to persuade people to give her what she wants.
| 24 | 24 | "Hatch Me If You Can" | December 20, 2010 | |
Mr. Hack gives an assignment to the students to take care of a gargoyle egg.
| 25 | 25 | "Date of the Dead" | January 6, 2011 | |
Frankie plays "wing-ghoul" for Ghoulia, but she does not expect Heath to be there.
| 26 | 26 | "A Scare of a Dare" | January 13, 2011 | |
The ghouls go to a sleepover at Clawdeen's house and Cleo's tries a mean-spirited prank on Frankie during Truth or Scare.
| 27 | 27 | "Parent-Creature Conference" | January 20, 2011 | |
Lagoona's teacher calls a parent-creature conference meaning that Lagoona has to call on her lovely "Aunt Lantic".

=== Volume 2 (2011) ===
| No. overall | No. in volume | Title | Original release date |
|---|---|---|---|
| 28 | 1 | "Scream Building" | February 8, 2011 |
After her entire fearleading team quits, Cleo and Frankie try to find members.
| 29 | 2 | "Why We Fright" | February 8, 2011 |
When no one shows up for fearleading try-outs, Frankie gets her ghoul friends to help Cleo.
| 30 | 3 | "Fear-a-Mid Power" | February 24, 2011 |
Cleo orders the ghouls to cheer at every event in school.
| 31 | 4 | "Beast Friends" | March 3, 2011 |
Draculaura's crush on Clawd leads to monstrous drama with Clawdeen.
| 32 | 5 | "Varsity Boos" | March 10, 2011 |
The Fearleading squad is determined to impress Cleo at the big spirit rally.
| 33 | 6 | "Gloomsday" | March 17, 2011 |
With their invitation to Gloom Beach denied and Cleo in a royal funk, the ghouls have one last chance to prove they've got spirits.
| 34 | 7 | "Falling Spirits" | March 24, 2011 |
The ghouls are horribly disappointed when they only get six hits on FrightTube (which is a parody of YouTube). So what they will do is to try to get more hits.
| 35 | 8 | "Fatal Error" | March 31, 2011 |
The ghoul's Gloom Beach dreams appear to be doomed. Is it time to move on, until they get the shock of their lives!
| 36 | 9 | "Screech to the Beach" | April 7, 2011 |
Their bags are packed and their spirits are high! When the Gloom Beach bus arrives, the ghouls embark on the scary-cool trip of a lifetime.
| 37 | 10 | "Witch Trials" | April 14, 2011 |
Scary Murphy issues some strenuous chores to the Monster High Fear Squad. Cleo insists Scary Murphy has her reasons, but the ghouls aren't so sure.
| 38 | 11 | "Don't Cheer the Reaper" | April 21, 2011 |
Ghoulia creates a routine for the team that's scientifically unbeatable, but Toralei steals her plans and sells it to the other team.
| 39 | 12 | "Road to Monster Mashionals" | April 21, 2011 |
The ghouls find out their routine has been stolen but together they find another way to win.
| 40 | 13 | "Queen of the Scammed" | May 5, 2011 |
Fearing her reign as queen of the social scene is coming to an end, Cleo comes up with a royal plan to be the talk of the school.
| 41 | 14 | "Frightday the 13th" | May 5, 2011 |
Cleo and the ghouls are in for a surprise when they brave the halls of Monster High for a sleepover on Friday the 13th.
| 42 | 15 | "HooDoo You Like?" | May 19, 2011 |
Frankie turns to Teen Scream magazine to solve her boyfriend dilemmas and ends up creating a monsterific mess.
| 43 | 16 | "Fear Pressure" | May 26, 2011 |
Draculaura and Clawd's differences aren't keeping them apart—until Clawdeen decides to throw a steak into their romance.
| 44 | 17 | "Fear The Book" | June 2, 2011 |
Toralei plots to scratch up trouble at Monster High, beginning with exposing Gil and Lagoona's relationship in the new Fearbook.
| 45 | 18 | "Desperate Hours" | June 9, 2011 |
Toralei reveals her ghastly plot to set up the ghouls, together they find a way to stop her plans.
| 46 | 19 | "Miss Infearmation" | June 16, 2011 |
Rumors swirl at Monster High when the Ghostly Gossip posts a spirited invite to an epic summer bash at Cleo's house, unbeknownst to the royal hostess.
| 47 | 20 | "Hyde and Shriek" | June 23, 2011 |
Cleo's party continues to go on when an uninvited guest catches her.
| 48 | 21 | "Daydream of the Dead" | July 14, 2011 |
Ghoulia's dreams of winning a first edition Deadfast comic book at Nekrocon are all but dead but an unexpected ghoul saves the day.
| 49 | 22 | "Nefera Again" | August 8, 2011 |
While back to school shopping the ghouls devise a plan to overthrow Nefera's summer dynasty.
| 50 | 23 | "Back-to-Ghoul" | August 11, 2011 |
The first day of school is a hair-raising experience, especially for Frankie who finds herself on thin ice with the new ghoul in school.
| 51 | 24 | "Abominable Impression" | August 11, 2011 |
Frankie and Abbey can't seem to catch a break when their chilling misunderstanding takes a wild turn.
| 52 | 25 | "Frost Friends" | August 25, 2011 |
Still trapped together, Frankie and Abbey try to teach three conniving kitties a lesson.
| 53 | 26 | "Hyde Your Heart" | August 25, 2011 |
Frankie forgives Jackson for standing her up at Cleo's party, so they go to a movie together.
| 54 | 27 | "Ghostly Gossip" | September 1, 2011 |
Tired of all the rumors being spread about them, the ghouls try to figure out who is the ghostly gossip.
| 55 | 28 | "Hiss-teria" | September 1, 2011 |
Cleo forms a mob of ghouls to back her up when she catches Deuce acting shady in the school's catacombs.
| 56 | 29 | "Phantom of the Opry" | September 26, 2011 |
After Cleo accuses her of stealing Deuce, Operetta tries to get revenge. Note: the title of this webisode is a play on the 1925 silent film, The Phantom of the Opera, starring Lon Chaney
| 57 | 30 | "The Bermuda Love Triangle" | September 26, 2011 |
Frankie seeks her ghoulfriends' advice about a monster dilemma and Cleo catches Deuce rocking out with Operetta.
| 58 | 31 | "Here Comes Treble" | September 26, 2011 |
Deuce rocks his musical tribute to Cleo, meanwhile, Frankie's in for an electrifying surprise.
| 59 | 32 | "Dueling Personality" | September 26, 2011 |
Frankie works to piece together a friendship between two total opposites.
| 60 | 33 | "Neferamore" | October 21, 2011 |
Nefera's dreadful attitude threatens to destroy the Fear Squad just as they're preparing for Monster Mashionals.
| 61 | 34 | "Rising From the Dead" | October 21, 2011 |
Nefera replaces the fearleading team, leaving the ghouls to compete against her at the Monster Mashionals.
| 62 | 35 | "Monster Mashionals Part 1" | November 17, 2011 |
Cleo and the ghouls fright for their chance to claim their spot as the victors of Monster Mashionals!
| 63 | 36 | "Monster Mashionals Part 2" | November 17, 2011 |
Nefera brings every idol to prevent the ghouls from winning, but with help from their friends, the ghouls stop her plans.

=== Volume 3 (2011–13) ===
| No. overall | No. in volume | Title | Original release date |
|---|---|---|---|
| 64 | 1 | "Dodgeskull" | December 8, 2011 |
Ghoulia, Frankie, and Lagoona devise a creeperific plan to prove to the school that zombies know how to take on even the most fearsome competitors.
| 65 | 2 | "Game of DeNile" | December 14, 2011 |
The ghouls lose on purpose at Cleo's favourite sleepover game so as not to trigger Cleo's competitiveness, until Abbey conjures up her ambitious spirit to win.
| 66 | 3 | "Uncommon Cold" | January 4, 2012 |
A germ-filled attack on Monster High threatens to ruin the ghouls' class trip to Monte Scarlo.
| 67 | 4 | "Ghosts with Dirty Faces" | January 4, 2012 |
Spectra tries to prove Heath's innocence in the disappearance of a statue.
| 68 | 5 | "Hickmayleeun" | January 4, 2012 |
Cleo teaches Operetta to act proper after she gets tickets to meet her favorite singer.
| 69 | 6 | "No Place Like Nome" | February 15, 2012 |
The ghouls try to cheer up a homesick Abbey by making Monster High feel more like home.
| 70 | 7 | "Sibling Rivalry" | March 1, 2012 |
Clawd devises a plan to get his feuding sisters, Clawdeen and Howleen Wolf into doing his chores.
| 71 | 8 | "The Nine Lives of Toralei" | March 15, 2012 |
Spectra uses her beast reporting skills to uncover personal secrets about Toralei!
| 72 | 9 | "Unlife to Live" | March 29, 2012 |
Ghoulia reveals her heroic side at Monster High.
| 73 | 10 | "Abyss Adventure" | April 12, 2012 |
Lagoona and Frankie venture into the deep end of the Monster High pool to retrieve Draculaura's necklace.
| 74 | 11 | "Unearthed Day" | April 20, 2012 |
Frankie helps Venus devise a freaky-fab plan to get the student bodies charged up about recycling.
| 75 | 12 | "Creepfast Club" | April 26, 2012 |
Mr. Rotter sentences the ghouls to detention, but for the unlife of them, they can't figure out what sinister acts they've done to wind up there.
| 76 | 13 | "Home Ick" | May 10, 2012 |
Frankie uses her mad scientist skills to impress Mrs. Kindergrübber on her Home Ick project.
| 77 | 14 | "HooDoo That VooDoo That You Do" | May 24, 2012 |
Toralei uses Hoodude's voodoo powers to torture the student bodies, until the ghouls figure out how to beat this conniving kitty at her own game.
| 78 | 15 | "I Know What You Did Last Fright" | June 7, 2012 |
Jackson tries to resurrect his unmemorable evening after waking up with red paint on his hands.
| 79 | 16 | "Honey, I Shrunk the Ghouls" | June 7, 2012 |
After Heath shrinks the ghouls with Mr. Hack's latest device, they have to get back to their normal size before Mr. Hack returns to the classroom.
| 80 | 17 | "HooDude VooDoo" | July 5, 2012 |
Hoodude tags along with the ghouls to see Frankenstein's Laboratory.
| 81 | 18 | "Undo the Voodoo" | July 12, 2012 |
Scarah helps the ghouls rewire the buttons and yarn inside Hoodude's brain to make him feel freaky fabulous about himself.
| 82 | 19 | "Night of a Thousand Dots (Dot Dead Gorgeous)" | August 23, 2012 |
Draculaura is so spooked by an untimely breakout, she's considering missing Cleo's big party, but not if the ghouls can help it.
| 83 | 20 | "Beast Ghoulfriend" | September 6, 2012 |
Spectra spreads a rumor about Frankie having scored tickets to a haunt concert for her and her GFF, but who will she invite to come along?
| 84 | 21 | "Aba-Kiss Me Deadly" | September 20, 2012 |
When technology goes dead at Monster High, Robecca's seemingly old fashioned methods send spirits soaring.
| 85 | 22 | "Bean Scare, Done That" | October 4, 2012 |
Nefera tries to foil the Fear Squad's fundraiser, but little does she know, the ghouls have a few tricks up their sleeves to fix the epic fail.
| 86 | 23 | "A Perfect Match" | October 18, 2012 |
The ghouls hope to find Abbey a scorchin' date to the Dance of the Dead by piecing together a voltage speed-dating plan. But whenever Heath shows up and starts to goof around, the ghouls might think he'll wreck everything, while Abbey started laughing at his goof-ups and chose him to the Dance.
| 87 | 24 | "Hiss-toria" | November 1, 2012 |
Take a haunting lurk back at Monster High throughout the years and how the school's student bodies have come to celebrate their differences.
| 88 | 25 | "The Need for Speed" | November 15, 2012 |
Ghoulia works her fingers to the bone to pay for a scooter that's quicker than DeadFast, but her speedy dreams are dashed when the bike is mysteriously stolen by Toralei.
| 89 | 26 | "The Halls Have Eyes" | November 29, 2012 |
Stone cold serious about her new role as Safety Monitor, Rochelle fears she may have to choose between her honored title and her beasties.
| 90 | 27 | "Mauled" | December 13, 2012 |
Zombies have been camping out all day in the hopes of being first in line for tomorrow morning's sale of the century at the local maul, much to Cleo's dismay.
| 91 | 28 | "Scare-born Infection" | December 27, 2012 |
A cootie breakout at Monster High has the student bodies creeped out, until Frankie puts a stop to the fearsome spread.
| 92 | 29 | "Boo Year's Eve" | January 1, 2013 |
2013 Promises to be an UHHH-mazing year full of friends, fun and some sinister screams come true in Monster High. Happy Boo Year!
| 93 | 30 | "Franken-Styled" | January 10, 2013 |
The ghouls become utterly possessed when faced with haunting task of picking the most freaky-fab picture day outfits.
| 94 | 31 | "Defending Your Lagoona" | January 24, 2013 |
Gil dives in head first and tries to teach his parents how to let go of ancient prejudices.
| 95 | 32 | "Freaky Fridate" | February 7, 2013 |
An ancient curse wreaks havoc on Ghoulia and Cleo's double date and threatens to ruin Ghoulia and Cleo's chance at finally capturing her first kiss.
| 96 | 33 | "The Ghoulest Season" | February 21, 2013 |
Frankie fights to keep her group stitched together as Abbey and C.A. Cupid argue over the nature of their latest class project.
| 97 | 34 | "Fright Dance" | March 7, 2013 |
Rochelle, Operetta, Lagoona, Howleen and Robecca are ready to do some dancing.
| 98 | 35 | "Scare-itage" | March 21, 2013 |
Skelita shares her family creeperific history and teaches her classmates that you can overcome any problem if you just find the good in it.
| 99 | 36 | "Tough As Scales" | April 4, 2013 |
Jinafire shows the boys that a strong will and sharp mind will help defeat even the freaky-fiercest of problems.
| 100 | 37 | "Tree of Unlife" | April 18, 2013 |
Venus rallies the student bodies to help save a beloved living tree at Monster High.
| 101 | 38 | "No Ghouls Allowed" | May 2, 2013 |
When all the guys say they can't make it for their dates because it's "Guys Night Out", the ghouls go digging for answers.
| 102 | 39 | "I Scream, You Scream" | May 16, 2013 |
When Cleo forgets to study, she goes to Scarah Screams for help.
| 103 | 40 | "Frankie's Joltin' Juice" | May 30, 2013 |
Deciding to serve refreshments at a dance, Frankie gets into a hilarious encounter when she states that she'll give free refunds to unsatisfied customers.
| 104 | 41 | "Tortoise and The Scare" | June 20, 2013 |
Ghoulia shows Toralei it's better to be scary smart than freaky fast.
| 105 | 42 | "Fierce Crush" | June 27, 2013 |
Howleen frights to get Romulus to notice her, but fails to see that someone already finds her fang-tastic.
| 106 | 43 | "Invasion of the Ghoul Snatchers" | July 11, 2013 |
Frankie and Draculaura go on the haunt for proof that aliens have invaded Monster High.
| 107 | 44 | "Flowers for Slo Mo" | July 11, 2013 |
Sloman "Slo Mo" Mortavitch conjures up a new personality to try and impress Ghoulia, but realizes too late that he already holds the key to her un-dead heart.
| 108 | 45 | "Ready, Wheeling and Able" | August 8, 2013 |
Frankie and the ghouls welcome a new student, Finnegan "Rider" Wake to Monster High, but they underestimate his skultimate need for speed.
| 109 | 46 | "Creature of the Year" | August 22, 2013 |
Headless Headmistress Bloodgood charges the ghouls with picking the next Monster High Creature of the Year.
| 110 | 47 | "Party Undead" | September 5, 2013 |
Heath is convinced that the fearsome creatures in his video game are coming to take over the freaktacular Friday the 13th dance.
| 111 | 48 | "Student Disembodied President" | September 19, 2013 |
Frankie decides to run for office so she can stand up for Slo-Mo and the zombies but soon discovers she might not be the beast candidate for the job.
| 112 | 49 | "Clawbacks" | October 8, 2013 |
Auditions for the school play take an unlikely turn when a spellbinding mishap leads Cleo and Toralei to win unexpected roles.
| 113 | 50 | "Field of Screams" | October 17, 2013 |
Toralei and the Werecat sisters think they have perfect plan to stop the Monster High guys and ghouls from beating them in corn maze race, but will an unexpected path lead to victory?
| 114 | 51 | "Angry Ghouls" | October 31, 2013 |
A new game app has Monster High in a trance until Robecca and Ghoulia join forces to get the student bodies to put their iCoffins down.
| 115 | 52 | "The Stich-uation" | November 14, 2013 |
Operetta and Toralei vie for the attention of Archer, the centaur, the new monster in school. But are they his type?
| 116 | 53 | "Scarah-Voyant" | November 28, 2013 |
It takes more than a little mind-reading to unite Scarah Screams and Invisi Billy, but lucky for them, the ghouls are freaktacular monster matchmakers.
| 117 | 54 | "Inscare-itance" | December 12, 2013 |
Cleo and Nefera de Nile go to dynastic lengths to prove their love to their grandmummy and win her most prized possession.
| 118 | 55 | "Playing the Boos" | December 26, 2013 |
When Johnny Spirit, Monster High's resident bad boy, emerges from centuries of detention, his arrival proves to be music to Operetta's ears.

==== DVD Bonus Episodes ====
| No. overall | No. in volume | Title | Original release date |
|---|---|---|---|
| 119 | 56 | "Department of Monster Vehicles" | October 8, 2013 |
The ghouls try to help Frankie pass her driving test. This is one of the three webisodes first released as an extra on the "13 Wishes" DVD on October 8, 2013
| 120 | 57 | "Royal Pest Sitter" | October 8, 2013 |
Cleo accidentally offers to look after the class pet while Rochelle is at a concert. This is one of the three webisodes first released as an extra on the "13 Wishes" DVD on October 8, 2013
| 121 | 58 | "Cookie Creeper" | October 8, 2013 |
Cleo's nail polish turns the ghouls' bake sale cookies into a cookie-dough monster. This is one of the three webisodes first released as an extra on the "13 Wishes" DVD on October 8, 2013
| 122 | 59 | "Crime Scream Investigation" | March 17, 2014 |
Cleo finds a rose in her locker causing Deuce to become jealous. This is one of the three webisodes first released as an extra on the "Frights, Camera, Action!" UK DVD on March 17, 2014 (March 25 in the US).
| 123 | 60 | "Games Ghouls Play" | March 17, 2014 |
The Werecat Twins, Meowlody and Purrsephone, chase two new mouse students. This is one of the three webisodes first released as an extra on the "Frights, Camera, Action!" UK DVD on March 17, 2014 (March 25 in the US).
| 124 | 61 | "Monster-morphoseas" | March 17, 2014 |
Lagoona is having a rough bad day. This is one of the three webisodes first released as an extra on the "Frights, Camera, Action!" UK DVD on March 17, 2014 (March 25 in the US).

=== Volume 4 (2013–15) ===
Volume 4 went on hiatus after the fifth episode, "Scream Spirit", due to episodes of Volume 3 & 4 airing in the wrong order. The series restarted on February 20, 2014, with new episodes, closer the release of the movie Frights, Camera, Action.

| No. overall | No. in volume | Title | Original release date |
|---|---|---|---|
| 125 | 1 | "Eye of the Boo-holder" | November 21, 2013 |
The ghouls use their mad art skills to create monsterpieces for the scaritage art show. This webisode was uploaded on November 21st, but was only accessible through a direct link until the intended release date of November 27th.
| 126 | 2 | "Who's the Boo Girl?" | November 21, 2013 |
After years in the jungle, new ghoul Jane Boolittle experiences culture shock when she arrives at Monster High. This webisode was uploaded on November 21st, but was only accessible through a direct link until the intended release date of November 27th.
| 127 | 3 | "Boo Ghoul at School" | November 21, 2013 |
The pets of the Monster High ghouls befriend Jane Boolittle and help her to overcome her shyness. This webisode was uploaded on November 21st, but was only accessible through a direct link until the intended release date of November 27th.
| 128 | 4 | "Creature Creepers Adventures, Part 1: Bat Dialing Disaster" | November 21, 2013 |
The Secret Creepers pets of the Monster High ghouls work together to help Draculaura avoid a batdialing disaster. This webisode was uploaded on November 21st, but was only accessible through a direct link until the intended release date of November 27th.
| 129 | 5 | "Scream Spirit" | November 21, 2013 |
When the Fear Squad can't perform, Frankie Stein recruits Venus McFlytrap, Slo Mo and Spectra Vondergeist. This webisode was uploaded on November 21st, but was only accessible through a direct link until the intended release date of November 27th.
| 130 | 6 | "Scareful What You Wish For" | February 20, 2014 |
Toralei discovers wishes can have scary consequences when she asks Gigi Grant for one wish too many.
| 131 | 7 | "Boogey Mansion" | February 20, 2014 |
When Cleo accidentally releases the Boogey Man's shadow nightmares from a mysterious box at Twyla's house, the ghouls must figure out howl to get these chilling escapes to go back in.
| 132 | 8 | "Monsters of Music" | February 20, 2014 |
Go behind the screams for an in-the-coffin lurk at the life and career of monster pop star, Catty Noir.
| 133 | 9 | "Tales from the Script" | February 20, 2014 |
Howleen Wolf thinks her sister Clawdia Wolf's adventurous stories are fangtastic—whether they're fact or over-the-top monster fiction.
| 134 | 10 | "Boolittle Too Late" | April 25, 2014 |
Jane Boolittle finally works up the courage to attend school with the other ghouls.
| 135 | 11 | "Jungle Boo-gie" | April 25, 2014 |
Jane Boolittle uses her jungle survival skills to survive her first dance.
| 136 | 12 | "Just Ghost to Show Ya" | April 25, 2014 |
Honey Swamp and the ghouls head to a party in the bayou to film a documentary.
| 137 | 13 | "Master of Hiss-guise" | April 25, 2014 |
Elissabat goes undercover with Draculaura and Viperine Gorgon at Monster High to prepare for a boovie role.
| 138 | 14 | "Zombie Shake" | May 28, 2014 |
Ghoulia made a potion that cause her to dance funky and spreads to everyone of Monster High in this music video. This webisode was first uploaded on May 28th, for the "A Night in Scare-adise: Prom 2014" event. It was later taken down, and re-uploaded on June 13th.
| 139 | 15 | "Just One of the Ghouls" | May 29, 2014 |
Catty Noir takes a break from her music career and goes to Monster High. But, her fans at school are giving her a tough time for her to be a regular student.
| 140 | 16 | "Join the Scream" | May 29, 2014 |
When vampire girls insult Toralei, she decided to help the ghouls in sport activities to win against the vampires.
| 141 | 17 | "In Plain Fright" | May 29, 2014 |
Catty attends Twyla and Invisi Billy's Disappearing Club meeting, just to get away from her fans. Twyla and Invisi Billy decided to help her by teaching her how to disappear.
| 142 | 18 | "Creature Creepers Adventures, Part 2: The Coin Calamity" | June 26, 2014 |
The Monster High Secret Creepers pets work together to recover Ghoulia's prized DeadFast coin before she even discovers it's missing.
| 143 | 19 | "We Are Monster High" | June 26, 2014 |
Join Catrine DeMew for your orientation at Monster High.
| 144 | 20 | "Creepateria" | June 26, 2014 |
The ghouls campaign for a fresher menu in the Creepateria and wind up getting a spooktacular new outdoor dining area, too.
| 145 | 21 | "I Only Have Eye for You" | July 23, 2014 |
When Draculaura tries to set up Iris and Manny Taur, she figures out a fangtastic plan to get these opposites to attract.
| 146 | 22 | "So You Think You Can Date" | July 23, 2014 |
The ghouls help Manny Taur impress Iris with a scary-sweet date in the Catacombs.
| 147 | 23 | "Inner Monster 1.0" | August 28, 2014 |
Ghoulia creates a freaky-fab app that understands the student bodies' inner thoughts and emotions.
| 148 | 24 | "Inner Monster 2.0" | August 28, 2014 |
Iris turns to the Inner Monster app to try to better understand Manny Taur.
| 149 | 25 | "Graveball Grates" | September 25, 2014 |
Eternal benchwarmer Neighthan Rot stumbles across the ghoul line to help Monster High win the big game.
| 150 | 26 | "Happy Howlidays" | September 25, 2014 |
Lagoona and Spectra introduce Sirena Von Boo to two new howlidays—New Tide's Eve and Chainsgiving--celebrating her fusion scaritage.
| 151 | 27 | "Boys Fright Out" | October 23, 2014 |
The mansters geek out when Deuce and Gil go head-to-head in an epic board game battle.
| 152 | 28 | "Creature Cribs" | October 23, 2014 |
The Monster High Secret Creepers pets share their haunting cribs with their new pet friends: Dustin, Chewlian, Cushion and Sweet Fangs.
| 153 | 29 | "Draculocker" | November 20, 2014 |
Draculaura will go batty if she has to fit one more thing in her school locker, so the ghouls make a scary-cool plan to shock her with a new locker.
| 154 | 30 | "Stage Frightened" | March 31, 2015 |
A long line of ghouls wait outside the Clawditorium for their chance to audition for the school's spring musical, Screaming in the Drain.

=== Volume 5 (2014–15) ===
On October 2, a Volume 5 webisode was uploaded onto YouTube. Much like Volume 4, Volume 5 seems to have started before the previous volume has come to its end. Notable changes in Volume 5 so far are an increased running time, and a slight improvement in the animation itself, such as more varied facial expressions, and the exterior of Monster High's main building changing to look more like the school as seen in the movie specials.

| No. overall | No. in volume | Title | Original release date |
|---|---|---|---|
| 155 | 1 | "Casta Vote" | October 2, 2014 |
The Monster High student bodies cast their votes to win a Halloween concert by pop sensation Casta and the Spells.
| 156 | 2 | "I Casta Spell On You" | October 9, 2014 |
Toralei provides the purrfect distraction to help Casta and the Spells overcome her stage jitters during her Halloween concert at Monster High.
| 157 | 3 | "Sayonara Draculaura" | January 8, 2015 |
Lured by its ultra-modern cities, freaky-fab fashions and scary-serene gardens, Draculaura decides to spend a scaremester in Shibooya, Japan.
| 158 | 4 | "Lochness Lorna" | January 15, 2015 |
Monster Exchange student Lorna McNessie, daughter of the Loch Ness monster from the Frightlands of Rotland can't resist a scary-fun photobomb op.
| 159 | 5 | "Meet You in Monster Picchu" | January 22, 2015 |
Before leaving for her scaremester at Monster High, Marisol Coxi, daughter of the South American Bigfoot, shares the furrrocious highlights of her village with her cousin Abbey Bominable.
| 160 | 6 | "Looks Gil-ty" | January 29, 2015 |
As Lagoona prepares for her scaremester in Madread, she worries that Gil might have already found a new fresh-water ghoulfriend.
| 161 | 7 | "The Agony of D'Feet" | February 5, 2015 |
After almost getting tripped up worrying about the size of her feet, Marisol Coxi encourages the ghouls to embrace their freaky flaws.
| 162 | 8 | "Gloom and Bloom, Part 1" | March 23, 2015 |
Lorna McNessie just got dumped by her boyfriend - via iCoffin! Luckily her ghoulfriends and Gil are there to frighten up her day! This webisode was uploaded on March 23rd, but was only accessible through a direct link until the intended release date of March 27th.
| 163 | 9 | "Gloom and Bloom, Part 2" | March 31, 2015 |
At the Gloom and Bloom dance, The corpse flower blossoms and reveals not just a bloom, but a ghoul, Amanita Nightshade, a long-lost frenemy from Cleo de Nile's past. This webisode was released March 31st, on BatteryPOP.com, prior to its release on YouTube and monsterhigh.com on April 3rd.
| 164 | 10 | "Bad Tomb-mates" | April 10, 2015 |
Ever since Amanita Nightshade emerged from the Corpse Flower blossom, she and Cleo have been fighting like bats and dogs. A game of truth or scare compels Cleo and Amanita to reveal that their ancient, bitter rivalry was years in the making, dating back to a time when the two lived together as tomb-mates.

=== Volume 6 (2015) ===
On June 19, 2015, Volume 6 webisodes started to be uploaded onto YouTube. Volume 6 seems to carry on the new changes made in Volume 5, including multiple-part webisodes. Volume 6 is also the final season volume for the Monster High web series.

| No. overall | No. in volume | Title | Original release date |
|---|---|---|---|
| 165 | 1 | "Freak Du Chic, Act 1" | June 19, 2015 |
With the help of their new friend Gooliope Jellington, Frankie and the ghouls set out to perform a big circus show to save the canceled art programs at Monster High.
| 166 | 2 | "Freak Du Chic, Act 2" | June 26, 2015 |
Gooliope gives the ghouls a crash course in circus performing as they work to put together the greatest show unearthed!
| 167 | 3 | "Freak Du Chic, Act 3" | July 3, 2015 |
It's the night of the big circus performance! Will the ghouls be able to raise enough money in time to save the art programs at Monster High?
| 168 | 4 | "From Fear to There, Part 1" | October 16, 2015 |
Meet three new creepy cool Monster Exchange ghouls, Batsy Claro, Kjersti Trollson and Isi Dawndancer as they begin their fateful journeys towards Monster High.
| 169 | 5 | "From Fear to There, Part 2" | October 23, 2015 |
New ghouls Batsy Claro, Kjersti Trollson and Isi Dawndancer learn that the interests that originally brought them to Monster High may not be what ultimately keeps them there.
| 170 | 6 | "Decomposition Class" | October 30, 2015 |
Frankie rallies her decomposition classmates together after Mr. Rotter asks each of them to describe why they belong at Monster High.

=== Promotional webisodes ===
| No. overall | No. in volume | Title | Original release date |
|---|---|---|---|
| 171 | P1 | "Kind: The Shockumentary" | October 3, 2011 |
The ghouls lose sight of their good spirits, so Ghoulia calls help from Lauren and Molly from the Kind Campaign. This special webisode was released in honor of Monster High's partnership with the Kind Campaign in 2011. It's considered a bonus episode as part of Volume 2.
| 172 | P2 | "Fashion Emergency" | October 21, 2011 |
Frankie and Clawdeen help Draculaura find a dress she has never worn for a dance. This webisode was made to advertise the "Dawn of the Dance" Draculaura, Frankie Stein and Clawdeen Wolf 3-pack exclusive to Walmart. It was released on the Walmart website and was uploaded on Argos.co.uk's YouTube channel. It's considered a bonus episode as part of Volume 3.
| 173 | P3 | "Super Fan" | October 29, 2011 |
Ghoulia and the other ghouls try to stop the other Casketball team from cheating. This webisode was made to advertise the "Go Monster High Team!!!" Fearleading Cleo de Nile, Draculaura and Ghoulia Yelps 3-pack exclusive to Toys "R" Us. It was uploaded by the Toys "R" Us YouTube account. It's considered a bonus episode as part of Volume 3.
| 174 | P4 | "Zom-Beach Party" | November 19, 2011 |
The ghouls try to teach Ghoulia to have fun at the beach. This webisode was made to advertise the "Gloom Beach" Cleo de Nile, Draculaura, Frankie Stein, Clawdeen Wolf and Ghoulia Yelps 5-pack exclusive to Target. It's considered a bonus episode as part of Volume 3.
| 175 | P5 | "We Stop Hate" | July 19, 2012 |
Draculaura doesn't know who she is anymore, and she gets help from Emily-Anne Rigal from We Stop Hate. This special webisode was released in honor of Monster High's partnership with the WeStopHate campaign in 2012. It's considered a bonus episode as part of Volume 3.

=== Adventures of the Ghoul Squad (2017–2018) ===
On August 11, 2017, Mattel Creations released an 11-minute 12-episode series on YouTube and YouTube Kids titled Monster High: Adventures of the Ghoul Squad which followed the second-generation reboot films. The series also debuted on KidsClick in the United States along with Barbie: Dreamtopia, on September 24, 2018.

| No. | Title | Original release date |
|---|---|---|
| 1 | "Calling All Ghouls" | August 11, 2017 |
Hearing the legend of a missing vampire princess, Draculaura, Frankie Stein, Clawdeen Wolf, Cleo de Nile and Lagoona Blue decide to look for her in the hopes of inviting her to Monster High.
| 2 | "Island Ghouls" | August 18, 2017 |
The Ghoul Squad heads to a tropical island to rescue a monster, except for Cleo who must stay behind and finish her schoolwork. This episode reintroduces the character of Gillington "Gil" Webber.
| 3 | "A Tale of Two Mountains" | August 25, 2017 |
The Ghoul Squad want to save Gil's island, and decide to search for a monster with ice powers to help them. This episode reintroduces the character of Abbey Bominable.
| 4 | "Gobsmacked" | September 1, 2017 |
Draculaura tries to hold a secret girl's night with Fangelica the night before a big test, while the rest of the Ghoul Squad chase after Gob who is trying to run away rather than take the test.
| 5 | "Boo-tiful Music" | September 8, 2017 |
The Ghouls investigate the legend of the Phantom of the Caverns, with Toralei Stripe inviting herself along. This episode reintroduces the characters of Toralei Stripe and Operetta.
| 6 | "Gargoyle and Water" | September 15, 2017 |
With a storm causing the roof of Monster High to leak, the Ghoul Squad heads to Paris to find a gargoyle. The episode reintroduces the character of Rochelle Goyle.
| 7 | "Too Much Scream Time" | September 22, 2017 |
With everyone immersed in the latest gaming app, Dracula takes Draculaura and Fangelica camping.
| 8 | "Monster High's Got Talent... Shows" | September 29, 2017 |
Famous monster pop star Catty Noir has gone into hiding after a disastrous stage show. This episode reintroduces the Catty Noir character from Boo York, Boo York.
| 9 | "The Sands of Toralei" | October 4, 2017 |
A bored Toralei steals the monster mapalogue. Unfortunately she breaks it, leaving her, Cleo and Lagoona stuck in the desert with no way home.
| 10 | "Garden Ghouls" | October 13, 2017 |
The Ghoul Squad helps Venus McFlytrap by traveling to her forest to confront a monster trying to destroy it. Meanwhile, Gil's Zen garden is overrun by monsters who don't understand the concept of meditation.
| 11 | "Howliday Edition - Part 1: The First Howliday" | January 19, 2018 |
Inspired by the concept of human holidays, the Ghoul Squad attempts to create a holiday for monsters.
| 12 | "Howliday Edition - Part 2: Sister Shock" | January 26, 2018 |
Wanting a family to spend the Howliday with, Frankie creates her own little sister, Alivia Stein.
| 13 | "Howliday Edition - Part 3: All Howl-ow's Eve" | February 2, 2018 |
It's the night before the first howliday and it's Clawdeen's job to get her little werepup brothers to go to sleep. But they would rather play in the snow Abbey has created. So, with the help of The Ghoul Squad, Clawdeen makes a high-stakes wager with the werepups – involving snowballs!
| 14 | "Howliday Edition - Part 4: Home for the Howlidays" | February 9, 2018 |
It's finally here! The very first howliday! Fangelica wants to show Draculaura how special she is to her, so she ventures out into the human world in search of the perfect howliday present. But she gets captured by a little human girl that loves monsters.
