= Salli Saffioti =

American actress

- Born: June 11; Oceanside, New York, U.S.
- Other name: Celeste Henderson
- Occupation: Actress
- Years active: 1996–present
- Agent: Atlas Talent Agency
- Spouse: Colin Mitchell (m. 2002; div. 2010)
- Children: 1

Salli Saffioti (born June 11) is an American actress. She is known for voicing roles in video games including Ingrid Hunnigan in Resident Evil 4, Resident Evil: Degeneration, Resident Evil: Damnation, Resident Evil 6, and Resident Evil: Death Island, Ming in Lost Odyssey, the Sea Captain's daughter in Tales of the Black Freighter, Razia in Prince of Persia: The Forgotten Sands and the Black Widow in Spider-Man: Web of Shadows. She also voices First Arcanist Thalyssra in World of Warcraft: Legion and the Female Hero in Fable II and III. In the Monster High franchise, she voices main characters Clawdeen Wolf and Cleo de Nile, which in later video installments, she goes under the stage name Celeste Henderson. She also goes under this name for non-union productions.

Saffioti was born in Oceanside, New York.

== Filmography ==
=== Film ===
Year	Title	Role	Notes
1998	The Week That Girl Died	Vinnie's Little Sister	
2004	A Day Without a Mexican	Mary Jo's Neighbour	
2005	Welcome to September	Lacy Hamilton	
2007	Hard Four	Julie Krieger Goldstein	
2008	Resident Evil: Degeneration	Ingrid Hunnigan (voice)	
2009	Watchmen	Annie Leibovitz	
2009	Tales of the Black Freighter	Sea Captain's Daughter (voice)	Direct-to-video film
2009	Memphis Calling	Donna	Short film
2009	Labor Intensive	Woman	Short film
2010	The Space Between	Trashy Lady	
2010	Rabbit Hole	Lori	
2010	Superman/Batman: Apocalypse	Gilotina (voice)	Direct-to-video film
2010	Superman/Batman: Apocalypse	Mad Harriet (voice)	Direct-to-video film
2010	Santa's Apprentice	Felix's Mom (voice)	
2012	High Threat Scenario	British News Anchor #1	Short film
2012	Monster High: Friday Night Frights	Clawdeen Wolf (voice)	Short film
2012	Monster High: Friday Night Frights	Cleo de Nile (voice)	Short film
2012	Resident Evil: Damnation	Ingrid Hunnigan (voice)	
2015	Monster High: Boo York, Boo York	Cleo de Nile (voice)	Direct-to-video film
2015	Monster High: Boo York, Boo York	Clawdeen Wolf (voice)	Direct-to-video film
2015	Back to the Future: Doc Brown Saves the World	Quantum Mind Jar (voice)	Direct-to-video film
2015	Dole Dippers: Monkeys	Monkey 2 (voice)	Direct-to-video film
2016	Monster High: Great Scarrier Reef	Clawdeen Wolf / Cleo de Nile (voices)	Direct-to-video film
2016	Welcome to Monster High	Clawdeen Wolf / Cleo de Nile (voices)	
2017	Gnome Alone	Chloe's Virtual Assistant (voice)	
2018	Scooby-Doo! and the Gourmet Ghost	Reporter (voice)	Direct-to-video film
2018	Scooby-Doo! and the Gourmet Ghost	Nancy Metcalf (voice)	Direct-to-video film
2020	Spycies	Mia (voice)	
2020	Enchantimals: Spring Into Harvest Hills	Cambrie Cow (voice)	
2022	Ghislaine Maxwell: Filthy Rich	Carolyn	
2022	World of Warcraft: Dragonflight	First Arcanist Thalyssra (voice)	
2022	Reimanged Volume 1: Nyssa	Marmee	Short film
2023	Resident Evil: Death Island	Ingrid Hunnigan (voice)	
2024	Delta Force	Haavk Commander (voice)	Direct-to-video film

=== Television ===
Year	Title	Role	Notes
1996	In the House	Candidate #4	
1997	In the House	Lucy	
1997	Crisis Center	Sandra	
1997	The Good News	Mrs. Marciano	
1998	Chicago Hope	Dee Kaysen	
1998–1999	Tracey Takes On...		
2001	ER	Carmen Turino	2 episodes
2002	For Your Love	Rachel	
2003	8 Simple Rules	French Woman	
2003	The Handler	Louise	
2003	Miss Match	Debra Maynor	
2004	The District	Ellen Gunner	
2004	NYPD Blue	Maxine Serasulo	
2006	In Justice	Marie	
2006	Crossing Jordan	Charlene Davis	
2010	In Plain Sight	Naomi	
2010	Monster High: New Ghoul at School	Clawdeen Wolf / Cleo de Nile (voices)	Television film
2010–2015	Monster High	Clawdeen Wolf / Cleo de Nile (voices)	Main role
2011	Monster High: Fright On!	Clawdeen Wolf / Cleo de Nile (voices)	Television film
2011	Mad	Mrs. Potato Head / Savannah Potato Head / Woman (voices)	
2012	Polly Pocket	Cassandra Alexandra (voice)	
2012	Monster High: Why Do Ghouls Fall in Love?	Clawdeen Wolf / Cleo de Nile (voices)	Television film
2012	Monster High: Escape from Skull Shores	Clawdeen Wolf / Cleo de Nile (voices)	Television film
2012	Monster High: Ghouls Rule!	Clawdeen Wolf / Cleo de Nile (voices)	Television film
2013	Monster High: Scaris, City of Frights	Clawdeen Wolf / Cleo de Nile (voices)	Television film
2013	Monster High: From Fear to Eternity	Clawdeen Wolf / Cleo de Nile (voices)	Television special
2013	Monster High: 13 Wishes	Clawdeen Wolf / Cleo de Nile (voices)	Television film
2014	Monster High: Frights, Camera, Action!	Clawdeen Wolf / Cleo de Nile (voices)	Television film
2014	Monster High: Freaky Fusion	Clawdeen Wolf / Cleo de Nile (voices)	Television film
2015	Ever After High: Spring Unsprung	Ginger Breadhouse (voice)	Television film
2015	Monster High: Haunted	Clawdeen Wolf (voice)	Television film
2015	Monster High: Haunted	Cleo de Nile (voice)	Television film
2015	Last Week Tonight with John Oliver	Voice Over	
2015–2016	Ever After High	Ginger Breadhouse (voice)	
2017	Major Crimes	Pediatrician	
2017	Monster High: Electrified	Clawdeen Wolf / Cleo de Nile (voices)	Television film
2017	Monster High: Adventures of the Ghoul Squad	Clawdeen Wolf / Cleo de Nile (voices)	Main role
2018–2019	Enchantimals: Tales from Everwilde	Merit Monkey (voice)	
2018–2019	Shameless	Libby	2 episodes
2019	We Bare Bears	Additional Voices	
2019	Dreamland	Hollis	
2020	Curious George	Harried Mom (voice)	
2020–2021	Animaniacs		
2021	Calls	911 Operator (voice)	2 episodes
2021	Amphibia	Jacinda (voice)	
2021	American Dad!	Isabella (voice)	
2021	Barbie: Big City, Big Dreams	Female Customer (voice)	Television film
2021	High Guardian Spice	The Triad (voice)	
2021	Scarlet Nexus	Haruka Frazer (voice)	
2021, 2024	Arcane	Amara (voice)	2 episodes
2021–2023	Stillwater		
2022–2024	Monster High	Mrs. O'Shriek / Skullette / Pawla (voices)	
2023	We Baby Bears		
2023	Bugs Bunny Builders	Penelope Pussycat (voice)	
2023	Adventures of the Great Wolf Pack	Snow Bunnies (voices)	
2023	What If...?	Additional Voices	
2024	Good Times		
2025	Creature Commandos	French Sex Worker (voice)	

=== Video games ===
List of voice performances in video games
Year	Title	Role	Notes	Source
2004	EverQuest II	Jodi, Bupipa Guryup, Innkeeper Yeonie		
2005	Resident Evil 4	Ingrid Hunnigan		
2005	Destroy All Humans!	Urban Female		
2006	The Sopranos: Road to Respect	Additional voices		
2006	Agatha Christie: Murder on the Orient Express	Greta Ohlsson, Hildegarde Schmidt		
2007	Lost Odyssey	Ming Numara		
2008	Fable II	Hero of Bowerstone (Female)		
2008	Spider-Man: Web of Shadows	Black Widow		
2008	Destroy All Humans! Path of the Furon	Veronica Stone		
2009	Eat Lead: The Return of Matt Hazard	Dexter's Darling (British Babe), Dexter's Darling (Southern Belle), Employee Artist		
2009	Resistance: Retribution	Lieutenant Raine Bouchard		
2009	Dragon Age: Origins	Various characters		
2010	White Knight Chronicles	Additional voices		
2010	Prince of Persia: The Forgotten Sands	Razia		
2011	Gears of War 3	Stranded Female		
2011	Skylanders: Spyro's Adventure	Whirlwind		
2011	Star Wars: The Old Republic	Additional voices		
2012	Kingdoms of Amalur: Reckoning	Additional voices		
2012	Resident Evil 6	Ingrid Hunnigan		
2012	Skylanders: Giants	Whirlwind		
2013	Metal Gear Rising: Revengeance	Mistral		
2013	Skylanders: Swap Force	Whirlwind		
2013	Batman: Arkham Origins	Bank Manager		
2014	Final Fantasy XIII: Lightning Returns	Additional voices		
2014	Infamous Second Son	Additional voices		
2014	Skylanders: Trap Team	Torch, Whirlwind		
2014–15	Final Fantasy XIV: A Realm Reborn	Iceheart, Shiva		
2015	Batman: Arkham Knight	Additional voices		
2015	Skylanders: SuperChargers	Torch, Whirlwind		
2015	Fallout 4	Female Raiders, Alyssa Park, Female Synths		
2016	Hitman	Francesca De Santis		
2016	World of Warcraft: Legion	First Arcanist Thalyssra		
2018	Paladins: Champions of the Realm	Furia, Jade Priestess (Seris), Dark Monarch (Lian)		
2018	Epic Seven	Sigret, Celeste, Carmainerose		
2018	Hitman 2	Francesca De Santis		
2019	Fire Emblem: Three Houses	Hilda Valentine Goneril	Credited as Celeste Henderson	
2020	Guardian Tales	Rue		
2020	Destiny 2: Beyond Light	Eramis, Kell of Darkness		
2021	Scarlet Nexus	Haruka Frazer	Credited as Celeste Henderson	
2022	Chocobo GP	Sylph		
2022	Neon White	Gabby		
2022	Fire Emblem Warriors: Three Hopes	Hilda Valentine Goneril		
2022	Saints Row	Sylvia		
2022	Star Ocean: The Divine Force	Melthia Zieler		
2023	Everspace 2	Dr. Delia Wendo		
2024	Batman: Arkham Shadow	Martha Wayne		
2025	Octopath Traveler 0	Alexia		
2025	Dune Awakening	Landsraad Tools Vendor, Landsraad Armor Vendor #2		
2026	Yakuza Kiwami 3 & Dark Ties	Additional voices		

=== Audio books ===
Year	Title	Role	Notes
2025	All Star Superman	Martha Kent	
