= Monster High: Fright On! =

- Promotional artwork
- Genre: Fantasy; Comedy; Children
- Based on: The Monster High fashion doll franchise by Mattel
- Screenplay by: Mike Montesano; Ted Zizik
- Story by: Mike Montesano; Audu Paden; Lauren Rose; Ira Singerman; Ted Zizik
- Directed by: Audu Paden; Alfred Gimeno; Vic Dal Chele
- Voices of: Debi Derryberry; Salli Saffioti; Kate Higgins; Laura Bailey; Audu Paden; Ogie Banks; Cindy Robinson; Yuri Lowenthal
- Music by: Steven Argila
- Countries of origin: United States; Canada
- Original language: English

Production
- Executive producers: Margaret M. Dean; Audu Paden
- Producers: Becky Bristow; Ira Singerman; Shannon Nettleton; Howard Schwartz
- Running time: 46 minutes
- Production companies: Mattel Entertainment; Wildbrain Entertainment

Original release
- Network: Nickelodeon
- Release: October 30, 2011

Related
- Monster High: New Ghoul @ School; Monster High: Why Do Ghouls Fall in Love?

Monster High: Fright On! is a 2011 2D-animated fantasy comedy children's television film special that aired on Nickelodeon in the United States on October 30, 2011.

It is the second film/TV special based on the Monster High fashion doll franchise by Mattel after New Ghoul @ School and it ties into the "School's Out" and "Dead Tired" branded doll lines which was released separately from the production.

== Continuity ==
Although a sequel to New Ghoul @ School, Fright On! is more in line with the regular webisodes. It takes place supposedly in Volume 2, while New Ghoul @ School is in Volume 1.

== Plot ==
At the Maul, Frankie Stein, Lagoona Blue, Draculaura Clawdeen and Clawd Wolf go to see the new film Twiheart and learn about the feud between vampires and werewolves upon arriving. At school, Headmistress Bloodgood announces that she is merging Monster High with two other schools: Belfry Prep, an all-vampire school, and Crescent Moon High, which is exclusively for werewolves. She hopes to unite all monsters and then eventually even the human community. While this unnerves Draculaura and Clawdeen, Frankie sees this as a good thing, especially after the Fear Squad is placed as welcoming committee. With help from Abbey Bominable, the ghouls make a set-up, only to have it sabotaged after the two schools arrive, lead respectively by two vampires named Bram Devein and Gory Fangtell and a werewolf named Dougey. Romulus, another werewolf who is Clawd's childhood friend, tells them to not cause trouble on their first day at their new school.

However, the first day ends in disaster as the vampires and werewolves claim species-only territory within the school and Cleo clashes with Gory, and Romulus becomes upset after finding out about Clawd's romance with Draculaura. Frankie gets an idea for a dance to bring the vampires and werewolves together with the help of her friends, which becomes successful. However, the next day, Administrator Van Hellscream, the human head of Monster and Normie relations, arrives and, accompanied by Miss Crabgrass, his monster assistant, takes over Monster High to continue the feud under the guise of peacekeepers, and Clawdeen and Clawd's younger sister Howleen gets caught up in the fight, prompting her siblings to start support groups called "Vampowerment" and "Were Pride". A disapproving Romulus begins to discreetly drive Draculaura and Clawd apart, and the two split after Draculaura questions why Clawd is listening to Romulus.

Suspicious, Frankie discovers that Crabgrass has petrified Bloodgood using "Gorgon Dust" and has disguised herself as her, while the real Bloodgood is put on display in the courtyard. After learning from Deuce Gorgon that the powder can also return a petrified person to normal, Frankie recovers it with Spectra and Lagoona's help, and Howleen and Draculaura join her. However, after restoring Bloodgood to normal, Van Hellscream captures and imprisons them in the Catacombs, saying that he has devoted his life to stopping the schools from uniting. Meanwhile, the vampires and werewolves blame each other and decide to end the feud with a fight in the gym at midnight, which Van Hellscream hopes will make everyone see that they are meant to be separated. Meanwhile, Abbey frees the girls, and they escape the Catacombswith help from Operetta, Clawdeen, and Clawd, with Howleen realizing that she was wrong about vampires.

Cleo apologizes upon realizing that she is treating Ghoulia the same way the vampires are the zombies. Before the fight starts, Howleen and Draculaura intervene, revealing that neither group kidnapped them, and Frankie delivers a speech that unites them, bringing peace. As the attendants come through the doors, they see how everyone is getting along. Van Hellscream and Crabgrass try to escape, only for Deuce to petrify them. Afterwards, Romulus reconciles with Clawd and becomes friends with Draculaura, Clawdeen starts to respect Howleen, and Cleo becomes friends with Gory.

== Cast ==
- Kate Higgins as Frankie Stein
- Debi Derryberry as Draculaura
- Salli Saffioti as Cleo de Nile and Clawdeen Wolf
- Laura Bailey as Lagoona Blue and Headless Headmistress Bloodgood
- Yuri Lowenthal as Deuce Gorgon, Gillington "Gil" Webber and Bram Devein
- Audu Paden as Ghoulia Yelps, Mr. Hackington, Manny Taur, Sloman "Slo-Mo" Mortavitch and Nightmare
- Cindy Robinson as Jackson Jekyll/Holt Hyde and Gory Fangtell
- Erin Fitzgerald as Abbey Bominable and Spectra Vondergeist
- America Young as Toralei Stripe and Howleen Wolf
- Ogie Banks as Clawd Wolf
- Gigi Sarroino as Operetta
- Cam Clarke as Heath Burns, Hoodude Voodoo, Van Hellscream, Romulus and Mr. Rotter
- Wendee Lee as Nefera de Nile and Mrs. Crabgrass

== Reception ==
CineMagazine rated it 2.5 stars.
