= Monster High: Friday Night Frights =

2013 Monster High TV/film special

- Based on: The Monster High fashion doll line by Mattel
- Written by: Mike Montesano; Ted Zizik
- Story by: Mike Montesano; Ted Zizik; Audu Paden; Lauren Rose; Ira Singerman
- Directed by: Dustin McKenzie
- Starring: Kate Higgins; Debi Derryberry; Salli Saffioti; Laura Bailey; Erin Fitzgerald; Andrew Duncan; Audu Paden; Ogie Banks; Cam Clarke; Evan Smith; Julie Maddalena Kliewer
- Music by: Steven Argila
- Countries of origin: United States; Canada
- Original language: English

Production
- Executive producers: For Mattel: Audu Paden; For Nerd Corps Entertainment: Asaph Fipke; Chuck Johnson; Ken Faier
- Producers: Tina Chow; Ira Singerman; Maria Elena Rodriguez (credited as Maria Rodriguez); Ira Singerman
- Running time: 44 minutes
- Production companies: Mattel Entertainment; Nerd Corps Entertainment

Original release
- Network: Nickelodeon
- Release: February 5, 2013

Related
- Monster High: Why Do Ghouls Fall in Love?; Monster High: Ghouls Rule

Monster High: Friday Night Frights is a 2012 animated adventure fantasy television film special produced by Nerd Corps Entertainment and released on 5 February 2013 on Nickelodeon in the United States.

It is the 5th television/film special based on the Monster High doll line by Mattel. Universal Pictures released it alongside Monster High: Why Do Ghouls Fall in Love? on 1 July 2014 as part of a Blu-ray release.

== Plot ==
Monster High has had a centuries-old tradition surrounding the roller-skating competition "Skultimate Roller Maze" (SKRM). When they are opposing the Gargoyles, whichever team loses will get the other team's crest. In the latest game Monster High had their crest taken away after losing to the Granite High Gargoyles, as the opposing team had cheated. Without the crest the school is deteriorating at a rapid pace, making it a necessity to win back the crest as soon as possible, however the last game left many players too injured to play. Several of the girls decide to take on the Gargoyles themselves, much to the consternation of the boys, who claim that only boys can properly participate in SKRM. They also remind them of Robecca Steam, who tried playing but was allegedly murdered and never heard from again.

The all-girls team begins practicing and slowly improves, but is disqualified at their first match due to Frankie's nervousness. They don't allow this to dissuade them from playing and also find various missing parts that allow them to rebuild Robecca Steam, who encourages them to be themselves and continue playing. This gives them the drive to keep playing, especially after a female student transfers over from Granite High and joins their team. The team then manages to progress to the point where they are able to play against the Gargoyles once more during the finals. Despite some injuries, the Monster High team wins but choose not to take Granite High's crest as they know that this will cause the same decay in their school. Like the "tradition" of male-only teams, they see this as a harmful tradition that needs to be stopped.

The episode ends with a roll call of the new co-ed team: Clawd, Operetta, Manny Taur, Gil Webber, Lagoona Blue, Heath Burns, Rochelle Goyle, and Robecca Steam.

== Cast ==
- Laura Bailey as Lagoona Blue, Headless Headmistress Bloodgood
- Ogie Banks as Clawd Wolf
- Cam Clarke as Heath Burns, Romulus
- Debi Derryberry as Draculaura
- Andrew Duncan as Gary
- Erin Fitzgerald as Abbey Bominable, C.A. Cupid, Rochelle Goyle, Spectra Vondergeist
- Kate Higgins as Frankie Stein
- Julie Maddalena as Robecca Steam & Venus McFlytrap
- Audu Paden as Announcer, Ghoulia Yelps, Manny Taur, Nightmare
- Cindy Robinson as Jackson Jekyll, Operetta
- Salli Saffioti as Clawdeen Wolf & Cleo de Nile
- Ira Singerman as Eye-ra
- Evan Smith as Deuce Gorgon, Bram, Gil Webber & Rocco
- America Young as Toralei Stripe & Howleen Wolf

== Production ==
To create the roller skater movements of Monster High characters, the Nerd Corps Entertainment animators bought and hired some roller skater boys and girls to use the motion capture suits as the reference model for the roller skater movements for the Skultimate Roller Maze competition and some roller skater scenes from the Monster High characters in this TV special.

== Reception ==
Dutch film critics magazine Cinemagazine gave a review for the TV special. Renee Longstreet from Common Sense Media reviewed the latter of which praised it for its "positive messages about diversity" while criticizing it for "iffy body images." DVD Talk reviewed it as part of the bi-film DVD/Blu-ray release with Why Do Ghouls Fall in Love?, noting that they found the features entertaining.

== Release titles by language ==
- Monster High: Os Pesadelos de Monster High (Brazilian Portuguese)
- Monster High: Fredagsfrygtløb (Danish)
- Monster High : Les frayeurs du Vendredi Soir (French)
- Monster High: Wettrennen um das Schulwappen (German)
- Monster High: Tromo-apolyto Protathlima Patinaz (Greek)
- Monster High: Péntek Esti Frász (Hungarian)
- Monster High: Fryktelig Forskrekket Fredag (Norwegian)
- Monster High: Viernes de Patinaje Terrorífico (Spanish)
