= Monster High: Boo York, Boo York =

2015 animated musical film

- DVD cover
- Directed by: William Lau
- Written by: Keith Wagner
- Based on: The Monster High fashion doll line by Mattel
- Produced by: Kyrsti R. Schwartz; Margaret M. Dean; Tina Chow
- Starring: Celeste Henderson; Karen Strassman; Wendee Lee; Evan Smith; Audu Paden; T. J. Smith; America Young; Kate Higgins; Sue Swan; Cindy Robinson; Rachel Staman; Lauren Weisman; Erin Fitzgerald
- Edited by: M.J. Offen
- Music by: Steven Argila
- Production companies: Mattel Playground Productions; Nerd Corps Entertainment; (credited as DHX Studios Vancouver)
- Distributed by: Universal Pictures Home Entertainment
- Release date: September 29, 2015
- Running time: 72 minutes
- Countries: United States; Canada
- Language: English

Monster High: Boo York, Boo York is a 2015 CGI-animated musical adventure fantasy children's film released on home video on September 29 and broadcast on Nickelodeon as a television special on October 25.

Directed by William Lau and written by Keith Wagner, who also provided its story and screenplay, the film is the 9th in the list of CGI-animated films and the 12 animated film overall based on the Monster High doll franchise by Mattel. The soundtrack charted on Billboard's US Kid Albums and US Soundtracks.

== Plot ==
Cleo de Nile's father Ramses invites his daughters to attend a fancy gala in Boo York featuring the showing of the Comet Crystal and heralding the arrival of a comet from outer space. Cleo invites her boyfriend Deuce and classmates Frankie, Clawdeen, Draculaura, Operetta, and Catty Noir, the last of whom has been struggling to come up with a new original song. They meet aspiring performer Luna Mothews, robotic DJ Elle Eedee, and ballerina Mouscedes King. They also bump into Toralei, who was invited by Cleo's sister Nefera. Ramses and Nefera conspire to take over Boo York by trying to set up Cleo with the gala patron Amuncommon Ptolemy's son Seth, where, if Cleo and Seth make a promise under the comet's power, the promise cannot be unbroken. Meanwhile, back at Monster High, Ghoulia discovers the comet seems to be on a collision course to Earth, and tries to stop it before it blows up the entire world.

== Voice cast ==
Cast listing from closing credits:

- Karen Strassman as Catty Noir
- Celeste Henderson as Cleo de Nile, Clawdeen Wolf
- Wendee Lee as Nefera de Nile
- T. J. Smith as Pharaoh and Seth Ptolemy
- America Young as Toralei Stripe
- Rachel Staman as Mouscedes King
- Laura Bailey as Elle Eedee, Head Mistress Bloodgood, Lagoona Blue
- Lauren Weisman as Luna Mothews
- Erin Fitzgerald as Astranova, Abbey Bominable, Slug Monster, Raven Queen
- Kate Higgins as Frankie Stein
- Cindy Robinson as Operetta, Mrs. Ptolemy
- Sue Swan as Draculaura
- Audu Paden as Ghoulia Yelps, Ramses de Nile, Mr. Hack, Manny Taur, Narrator, Neckbet the Waiter
- Cameron Clarke as Heath Burns, Mr. Rotter, Crazy Deady
- Evan Smith as Deuce Gorgon, Two Headed Agent
- Jonquil Goode as Twyla Boogeyman, Apple White
- Todd Haberkorn as Skeletal Mummy

== Soundtrack ==
Monster High: Boo York, Boo York

Soundtrack album by Monster High
- Released: September 25, 2015
- Recorded: United States
- Genre: Children's music, soundtrack
- Length: 28:06
- Label: Universal
- Producer: Mattel

=== Track listing ===
No.	Title	Length
1.	"Love Is Like a Storm Tonight" (featuring Catty Noir)	3:15
2.	"Search Inside" (featuring Catty Noir)	3:36
3.	"Fright Lights, Big City"	2:03
4.	"Empire" (featuring Nefera de Nile & Ramses de Nile)	2:56
5.	"It Can't Be Over" (featuring Cleo de Nile & Deuce Gorgon)	3:22
6.	"Boo York, Boo York" (featuring Pharaoh & Catty Noir)	2:42
7.	"Steal the Show" (featuring Toralei Stripe, Luna Mothews & Catty Noir)	3:41
8.	"Shooting Stars" (featuring Astranova, Pharaoh & Catty Noir)	3:22
9.	"We Are Monster High"	2:20
10.	"Monster High Fright Song"	2:49
Total length:		28:06

=== Charts ===
Chart (2015)	Peak position
US Kid Albums (Billboard)	5
US Soundtracks (Billboard)	12

== Merchandise ==
Several doll lines were developed from Boo York, Boo York: City Ghouls, City Schemes, Gala Ghoulfriends, Frightseers, Comet-Crossed Couple, and Out-of-Tombers.

Author Perdita Finn released a junior novel for the book (ISBN 9780316301190) which was published by Little, Brown Books for Young Readers in 2015, a Passport to Reading book titled Catty Finds Her Voice and a kids book called Welcome to Boo York.
