= List of Monster High films =

This article lists all the films and television specials based on Monster High, an American fashion doll and media franchise launched by Mattel in June 2010.

The films and television specials were broadcast on Nickelodeon in the United States and released on home video formats by Universal Pictures Home Entertainment until 2017. In 2016, Mattel rebooted the franchise with the release of an origin story film special titled Welcome to Monster High, using updated animation modules and technologies. A second relaunch began in 2022 with an animated TV series and a live-action musical film, which were released on both Nickelodeon and Paramount+.

== First-generation (2D) films (2010–2011) ==
Animation for the films/specials below was provided by Wildbrain Entertainment with additional animation by Top Draw Animation.

No. in series	Title	Director	Writer(s)	Runtime	Release date Broadcast date (Nickelodeon)	Notes
1	Monster High: New Ghoul at School	Audu Paden & Eric Radomski	Anne D. Bernstein, Audu Paden, Lauren Rose & Ira Singerman	23 minutes	October 31, 2010 (Nickelodeon)	
2	Monster High: Fright On!	Audu Paden, Alfred Gimeno & Vic Dal Chele	Mike Montesano & Ted Zizik	46 minutes	October 30, 2011 (Nickelodeon)	

== First-generation (3D) films (2012–2016) ==
Animation for this generation was produced by Nerd Corps Entertainment until 2016 (credited as Vancouver studio subsidiary of DHX Media thereafter in the last two films due to DHX's acquisition of Nerd Corps).

No. in series	Title	Director	Writer(s)	Runtime	Release date Broadcast date (Nickelodeon)	Notes
3	Monster High: Why Do Ghouls Fall in Love?	Steve Sacks & Dustin Mckenzie	Ted Zizik & Mike Montesano	46 minutes	February 12, 2012 (Nickelodeon); February 5, 2013 (DVD pack) (Note: Why Do Ghouls Fall in Love? and Friday Night Frights were released as a double feature on DVD on February 5, 2013.)	
4	Monster High: Escape from Skull Shores	Steve Ball & Andrew Duncan	Mike Montesano & Ted Zizik	46 minutes	April 13, 2012 (Nickelodeon)	
5	Monster High: Friday Night Frights	Dustin Mckenzie	Mike Montesano & Ted Zizik	46 minutes	January 21, 2013 (iTunes); February 5, 2013 (DVD/Blu-ray pack); September 6, 2013 (Nickelodeon)	
6	Monster High: Ghouls Rule	Mike Fetterly & Steve Sacks	Ted Zizik & Mike Montesano	71 minutes	October 9, 2012 (DVD/Blu-ray); October 26, 2012 (Nickelodeon)	
7	Monster High: Scaris: City of Frights	Dustin Mckenzie	Mike Montesano & Ted Zizik	61 minutes	March 3, 2013 (Nickelodeon)	
8	Monster High: 13 Wishes	Steve Saches, Andrew Duncan & Audu Paden		73 minutes	October 8, 2013 (DVD/Blu-ray); October 25, 2013 (Nickelodeon)	
9	Monster High: Frights, Camera, Action!	William Lau & Sylvain Blais	Audu Paden & Dan Serafin	73 minutes	March 25, 2014 (DVD/Blu-ray); April 18, 2014 (Nickelodeon)	4th direct-to-DVD release
10	Monster High: Freaky Fusion	William Lau & Sylvain Blais	Keith Wagner	73 minutes	September 30, 2014 (DVD); October 24, 2014 (Nickelodeon)	
11	Monster High: Haunted	Dan Fraga & William Lau	Keith Wagner	75 minutes	March 24, 2015 (DVD); April 17, 2015 (Nickelodeon)	
12	Monster High: Boo York, Boo York	William Lau	Keith Wagner	71 minutes	September 29, 2015 (DVD); October 25, 2015 (Nickelodeon)	
13	Monster High: Great Scarrier Reef	William Lau & Jun Falkenstein	Nina Bargiel & Shane Amsterdam	71 minutes	February 12, 2016 (Digital HD); March 22, 2016 (DVD-Blu-ray combo pack)	

== Second-generation films (2016–2017) ==
In 2016, the series was rebooted with updated character designs, origin stories and upgraded animation modules and technologies. Animation provisions for this generation were taken over by a United Kingdom-based animation studio known as "Flaunt Productions/Studios".

No. in series	Title	Director(s)	Writer(s)	Runtime	Release date Broadcast date (Nickelodeon)	Notes
14	Welcome to Monster High	Stephen Donnelly & Olly Reid	Dana Starfield, Shane Amsterdam & Stephen Donnelly	73 minutes	August 27, 2016 (screening, DVD)	According to sources, this is the last production after Barbie: Spy Squad to be released under the Mattel Playground Productions banner before the absorption into Mattel Creations (now Mattel Television).
15	Monster High: Electrified	Avgousta Zourelidi, Jun Falkenstein & René Veilleux	Keith Wagner	71 minutes	March 28, 2017 (DVD); April 23, 2017 (Nickelodeon)	

== Third-generation films (2022–present) ==
Mattel released two live-action musical films, alongside an animated TV series that was developed by its division Mattel Television.

No. in series	Title	Director(s)	Writer(s)	Runtime	Release date Broadcast date (Nickelodeon)	Notes
16	Monster High: The Movie	Todd Holland	Jenny Jaffe, Greg Erb and Jason Oremland	92 minutes	October 6, 2022 (Paramount+ and Nickelodeon)	
17	Monster High 2	Todd Holland	Todd Holland, Matt Eddy and Billy Eddy	93 minutes	October 5, 2023 (Paramount+ and Nickelodeon)	

== Films in development ==
Mattel, through its film division, and Universal Pictures are developing a theatrical live-action Monster High film. Akiva Goldsman is attached to write (alongside with Hannah Hafey and Kaitlin Smith) and produce under his banner, Weed Road Pictures, with producer Robbie Brenner. Gerard Johnstone is set to direct the film.

No. in series	Title	Director(s)	Writer(s)	Runtime	Release date	Notes
N/A	Untitled live-action Monster High film (Universal version)	Gerard Johnstone	Akiva Goldsman; Hannah Hafey; Kaitlin Smith	TBA	TBA	

== Cancelled films ==
No. in series	Title	Director(s)	Writer(s)	Runtime	Release date	Notes
N/A	Untitled live-action Monster High film (first attempted Universal version)	Ari Sandel	Craig Zadan, Neil Meron, Stephanie Savage and Josh Schwartz	N/A	October 7, 2016 (cancelled)	Nothing was heard about it since its announcement.
N/A	Monster High: Feary Tale	N/A	N/A	N/A	Late 2016 (cancelled)	Cancelled due to Ever After High's cancellation and reboot of Monster High. Storyboards uploaded to YouTube titled Monster High: The Lost Movie.
N/A	Third live-action Nickelodeon Monster High film	N/A	N/A	N/A	2024 (cancelled)	Cancelled due to Universal Pictures making a new live action film.
