= Miles Doleac =

American actor, writer, director and producer

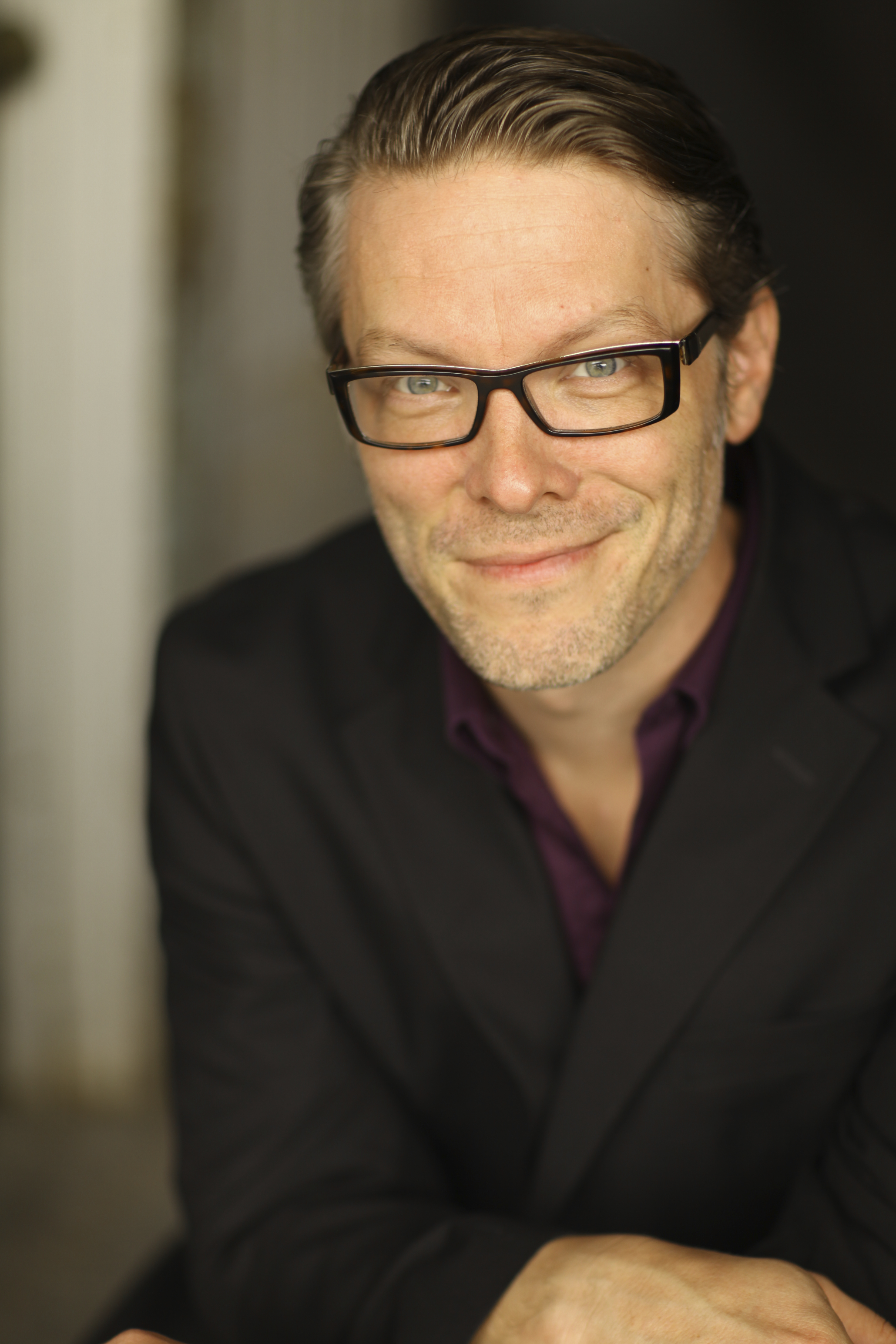
- Born: Miles Christopher Doleac; November 26, 1975 (age 50); Hattiesburg, Mississippi
- Education: BFA - North Carolina School of the Arts MA - University of Southern Mississippi PhD - Tulane University
- Occupations: Actor; Director; Writer; Producer
- Years active: 2003–present
- Notable work: The Historian; The Hollow
- Spouse: Lindsay Anne Williams (m. 2014)

Miles Christopher Doleac (born November 26, 1975) is an American actor, director, writer and producer. He has had acting roles in several films and television shows since 2011 including Watchmen, Lovecraft Country, Treme, Sleepy Hollow, American Horror Story, Salem, Complications, Roots, and several episodes of the CW's Containment. He also has acting roles in the films The Family Plan, Renfield, The Magnificent Seven, and Don't Kill It.

Doleac founded Historia films in 2014, the production company which produced The Historian (2014), The Hollow (2016), Demons (2017), Hallowed Ground, The Dinner Party, Demigod, and Open (2023). He was a writer, director, producer, and a cast member on all seven films. Doleac co-wrote The Dinner Party and Demigod with Michael Donovan Horn. He co-wrote Open with Lindsay Anne Williams.

== Early life and academic career ==
Miles Christopher Doleac was born on November 26, 1975, in Hattiesburg, Mississippi. He attended the University of North Carolina School of Arts and graduated with a Bachelor of Fine Arts degree in drama. He went on to attend University of Southern Mississippi, graduating with a Master of Arts degree in history. Doleac holds a PhD in Ancient history from Tulane University. He serves as interim chair of Digital Filmmaking at the Loyola University New Orleans. In the early 2000s, Doleac moved to California to pursue an acting career; he was unsuccessful and instead chose to further pursue his academic career.

In 2005, he moved to New Orleans to study as a graduate fellow at the Murphy Institute, part of Tulane University. While working on his doctorate he was also a visiting student at Goethe-Institute in Munich (summer 2007), American School of Classical Studies-Athens (summer 2008), and American Academy in Rome (summer 2009). He earned a PhD in Ancient History from the School of Liberal Arts. He completed his dissertation on Pope Gregory I and his role "in developing permanent ecclesiastical institutions under the authority of the Bishop of Rome to feed and serve the poor."

Until 2019, Doleac served as an assistant professor of classics, while also teaching film courses in the School of Mass Communications and Journalism at the University of Southern Mississippi. In late summer 2019, he accepted a position as an assistant professor of Digital Filmmaking at Loyola University New Orleans. In 2014, he published a book about Alexander the Great titled In the Footsteps of Alexander: The King Who Conquered the Ancient World..

== Film and television career ==
In July 2012, Doleac founded Historia Films, an independent production company. Between 2011 and 2014, he had small starring roles in several films such as Storm War See Girl Run and Mighty Fine. He has had guest appearances in several TV series, including: Treme, Breakout Kings, and Sleepy Hollow. Doleac directed a 30-second commercial for a Hattiesburg dog park's entry into PetSafe's Bark for Your Park contest in 2014, which won $25,000 for the building of a dog park in Doleac's hometown of Hattiesburg, MS. The commercial featured Hattiesburg's own Brett Favre.

The Historian (2014) was the first feature-length film from Historia Films. It first premiered May 20 New York City's SoHo International Film Festival. It was also featured in the Los Angeles's Dances With Films 17. On July 11, the film had the honor of opening the Long Island International Film Expo in Bellmore, New York. On October 20, it was featured at the Gulfport Sun and Sand Film Festival. It opened theatrically in limited release in New York, Los Angeles, and Doleac's home state of Mississippi, where it was shown in Hattiesburg and D'Iberville starting on November 7.

The Historian garnered mixed receptions from the few critics that reviewed it. Ben Kenigsberg of The New York Times stated, "Despite low production values, The Historian [...] sustains curiosity over what [...] is a long running time." Serena Donadoni of The Village Voice derides Doleac as "a filmmaker [who] can't reconcile all his story lines." The film's central performance by William Sadler (actor) did receive near universal acclaim, with Frank Scheck of The Hollywood Reporter writing, "Veteran actor William Sadler delivers a superb performance in this thoughtful if overly soapy drama set in the world of academia."

Also 2014, Doleac became the executive director of FestivalSouth Film Expo at the Grand 18 theater in Hattiesburg. He was asked to join the team organizing the festival by Mike Lopinto, FestivalSouth's artistic director. Doleac was tasked with organizing the festival line-up and acquiring celebrity guests to fill the festival's panels. The festival features, but is not limited to, films that have either been filmed in Mississippi or made by Mississippians.

In 2014 and 2015, Doleac appeared in two episodes of FX's American Horror Story. In 2015, he had guest appearance roles in Banshee, Salem, and Complications. He also appeared in The Astronaut Wives Club and the film Vacation. In May 2015, he starred in a production of Andrew Lloyd Webber's Jesus Christ Superstar. He swapped between the roles of Jesus Christ and Judas Iscariot with co-star Joseph VanZandt throughout the four days of performances.

In June 2015, Doleac began filming The Hollow with executive producer Lisa Bruce. The Hollow is a mystery thriller about FBI agents investigating a Mississippi triple homicide which included the daughter of a US congressman. Much of the filming was done in Doleac's hometown and other towns around the Pine Belt in Mississippi. The film stars: James Callis, Christiane Seidel, Jeff Fahey, William Sadler, William Forsythe, and Doleac himself, who also produced, wrote and directed it. Doleac played a local sheriff's deputy with very questionable morals.

In February 2016, The Hollow was acquired by Uncork’d Entertainment for distribution. It was released in select theaters and video on demand on October 7, 2016. Doleac won best actor for The Hollow at the 2016 Long Island International Film Expo.

The film received mixed reviews from critics. In particular, Noel Murray of the Los Angeles Times wrote "While the dialogue is colorful and the acting strong, this is ultimately a 90-minute neo-noir stretched unnecessarily past two hours." Expressing a more positive opinion, Sherilyn Connelly of SF Weekly stated that "Miles Doleac's The Hollow is a fun little genre potboiler that gets it right." That same year he directed and starred in a production of Kander and Ebb's Cabaret (as 'the Emcee').

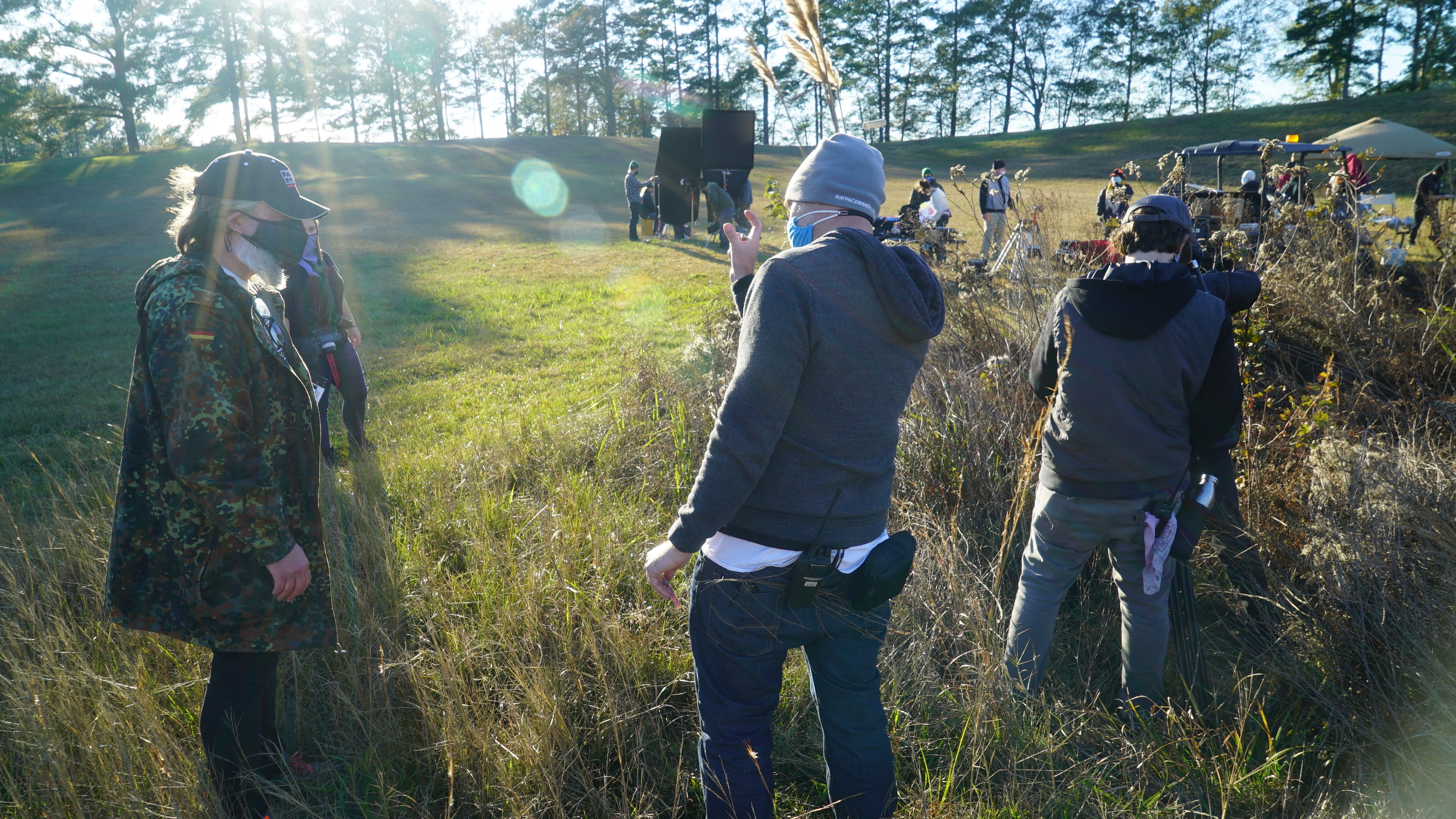
Doleac sets up a shot for Demigod with director of photography, Nathan Tape.

Since 2015, Doleac had roles in Underground, Game of Silence, Roots, and The Magnificent Seven, among others. He had a recurring role in The CW limited series Containment, appearing in five out of the thirteen episodes. He also appears in horror thriller Don't Kill It, released in August 2016. In 2017, he shot a lead role in Active Entertainment's Mississippi River Sharks and appears in an episode of AMC's Halt and Catch Fire. In Spring 2017, Doleac took to the stage again, playing the role of 'King Arthur' in Lerner and Loewe's Camelot, in two different productions (with Hattiesburg Civic Light Opera and the Natchez Festival of Music).

Doleac's third film, Demons, starring Doleac himself, Lindsay Anne Williams, Steven Brand, Andrew Divoff, and John Schneider, had a limited theatrical release, coupled with day-and-date streaming release on October 6, 2017. The film also won Best Narrative at Rails to Reels Film Festival.

Demons received mostly positive reviews, although Noel Murray of the Los Angeles Times wrote, "The ambitious auteur is getting better at making his novelistic ideas punchy and cinematic, but "Demons" is still a B-movie that takes itself too seriously ... Still, Doleac's forging a niche. His name on a picture is now an indication that genre fans will see something different ...".

Doleac's fourth original film titled Hallowed Ground released June 7, 2019.". A film about Vera and Alice, a young married couple trying to rebuild their relationship after an affair, who take a trip to a secluded cabin, where they stumble into a longstanding blood feud between the Native American owners of the property and the neighboring clan, who obsessively guard their land and punish those who trespass on it in gruesome and terrifying ways. The film was written by Doleac himself, and produced by Doleac, Lindsay Anne Williams, Wesley O’Mary and Michael Williams. Doleac's fifth feature, The Dinner Party shot in Hattiesburg, Mississippi, in July and August, 2019 and, starring Bill Sage, Doleac, Lindsay Anne Williams, Alli Hart, and Jeremy London, among others, was released June 9, 2020. The film was produced by Doleac, James V. Bulian, Wesley O'Mary, and Lindsay Anne Williams. Early reviews were positive with Debbie Lynn Elias of Behind the Lens calling the film "Delectable... delicious... dark... and macabrely fun." Josiah Teal of Film Threat called The Dinner Party "A solid horror film that had me watching parts through slightly covered eyes." Expressing a more critical opinion, Niall Browne of Movies in Focus writes that, while the film "gets a few things right", it "ultimately fails to serve-up the requisite amount of tension to deliver the goods."

Doleac's sixth feature, Demigod, stars Rachel Nichols, Yohance Myles, Doleac, Lindsay Anne Williams, Elena Sanchez, and Jeremy London. It was released on October 15, 2021 and is about a woman (Nichols) who travels with her husband (Myles) to her birthplace in Germany's Black forest upon the death of her grandfather (London), only to find a terrifying secret awaits them.

Initial reviews were mostly positive, with Michael Talbot-Haynes of Film Threat writing, 'Demigod is an excellent addition to the folk horror sub-genre and a remarkable example of what small productions can pull off these days.'

In November 2023, Doleac's Open, a hybrid romantic dramedy/musical, released for a limited theatrical run and across various streaming platforms. The film was distributed by Virgil Films and stars Lindsay Anne Williams, Jeremy London, Doleac, Elena Sanchez, and William Forsythe. The plot outlines a woman in a troubled marriage who falls for a former teen heartthrob, fallen from industry favor while having nagging (and empowering) hallucinations about fronting an 80's New Wave Band.

Early reviews were positive, with Bill Arceneaux writing "an extremely impressive and very surprising watch due to the stripping away of the expectations of genre, blending the best of all categories into one piece… Open is my favorite of Doleac’s movies." Bradley Gibson of Film Threat said, “The fantasy band performances really seal the deal for Open.”

== Filmography ==
=== Actor ===
- Open – Robert (2023)
- The Family Plan – (2023)
- Renfield – Hunter (2023)
- Big George Foreman – British Journalist (2023)
- Mike – John Halpin, Season 1, Episode 2 (2022)
- Devil's Workshop – Chip (2022)
- Legacies – Magnus the Magnificent, Season 4, Episode 11 (2022)
- Demigod – Arthur (2021)
- Vanquish – Erik (2021)
- The Dinner Party – Vincent (2020)
- Lovecraft Country – Hiram Epstein, Season 1, episode 3 (2020)
- The Purge – Paul, Season 2, Episode 9 (2019)
- NCIS: New Orleans – South Ossetian Cop, Season 5, Episode 23 (2019)
- Claws – Tom, Season 3, Episode 1 (2019)
- Watchmen – German Officer, Season 1, Episode 2 (2019)
- Christmas in Louisiana – Mr. Lascoe (2019)
- Hallowed Ground – Bill Barham (2018)
- Santa Jaws – Mike (2018)
- Did I Kill My Mother? – Andrew Romero (2018)
- Attack of the Southern Fried Zombies– Dr. Klein (2017)
- Mississippi River Sharks – Ray Mitchell (2017)
- Demons – Colin (2017)
- Valor – News Anchor, season 1, episode 8 (2017)
- Halt and Catch Fire – Bill (2017)
- S E Q U E N C E – Spencer (2015)
- The Magnificent Seven – Faraday Card Game #2 (2016)
- Don't Kill It – Deacon Shepard (2016)
- Race to Win – Carter (2016)
- Containment (TV series) – Captain Scott (2016)
- The Hollow – Ray Everett (2016)
- Roots (miniseries)– Mr. MacGregor (2016)
- Game of Silence (TV series) – Don Lowen (2016)
- Underground (TV series) – Watts (2016)
- Shark Lake – Garreth Ross (2015)
- The Astronaut Wives Club (TV Series) – Producer (2015)
- Complications (TV Series) – Dr. Ian Blair (2015)
- Vacation – Man at Monument (2015)
- The Livingston Gardener – Aiden Reynolds (2015)
- Salem (TV Series) – Captain Braun (2015)
- Bad Asses on the Bayou – Talk Show Host (2015)
- Banshee (TV series) – Roland (2015)
- American Horror Story (TV Series) – Watcher (2014)
- Jake's Road – Heath (2014)
- Cat Run 2 – Dimitri Vetrok (2014)
- The Historian – Ben Rhodes (2014)
- Sleepy Hollow (TV Series) – William Grey (2013)
- Treme (TV Series) – Producer (2012)
- Mighty Fine – Mr. Smith (2012)
- Breakout Kings (TV Series) – Rocker / Johnny Griffin (2012)
- See Girl Run – Del (2012)
- Miami Magma (TV Movie) – Butch Sanderson (2011)
- Storm War – Secretary of Defense (2011)
- Terminator 3: Rise of the Machines (2003) (stand-in)

=== Director ===
- Open (2023)
- Demigod (2021)
- The Dinner Party (2020)
- Hallowed Ground (2019)
- Demons (2017)
- The Hollow (2016)
- The Historian (film) (2014)

=== Producer ===
- Open (2023)
- Demigod (2021)
- The Dinner Party (2020)
- Hallowed Ground (2019)
- Demons (2017)
- The Hollow (2016)
- The Historian (film) (2014)

=== Writer ===
- Open (co-writer) (2023)
- Demigod (co-writer) (2021)
- The Dinner Party (co-writer) (2020)
- Hallowed Ground (2019)
- Demons (2017)
- The Hollow (2016)
- The Historian (film) (2014)
