= The Hollow (2016 film) =

Crime film by Miles Doleac

- Release poster
- Directed by: Miles Doleac
- Written by: Miles Doleac
- Produced by: Miles Doleac; Ryan H. Jackson; Mackenzie Westmoreland
- Starring: James Callis; Miles Doleac; Christiane Seidel; William Sadler; David Warshofsky; Jeff Fahey; William Forsythe
- Cinematography: Ben McBurnett
- Edited by: D.J. Sing
- Music by: Clifton Hyde
- Production company: Historia Films
- Distributed by: Uncork'd Entertainment
- Release date: October 7, 2016
- Running time: 128 minutes
- Country: United States
- Language: English
- Box office: $3,755

The Hollow is a 2016 American Southern noir crime film written, produced and directed by Miles Doleac. It stars James Callis, Doleac, Christiane Seidel, William Sadler, David Warshofsky, Jeff Fahey, and William Forsythe. The plot is about two FBI agents arriving in a small southern town after a congressman's daughter is murdered and threating to put everyone out of business.

The independent film was shot on location in Mississippi. It was released on October 7, 2016.

== Cast ==
- James Callis as Vaughn Killinger
- Miles Doleac as Ray Everett
- Christiane Seidel as Sarah Desoto
- William Sadler as Sheriff Beau McKinney
- Jeff Fahey as Darryl Everett
- William Forsythe as Big John Dawson
- David Warshofsky as Principal Adam Markey

== Production ==
The Hollow was written and directed by Miles Doleac. It is the second film produced by his independent production company Historia Films, after The Historian (2014). The principal cast are: James Callis, Doleac, Christiane Seidel, William Sadler, David Warshofsky, Jeff Fahey, and William Forsythe. Doleac discussed in an interview the difficulties during pre-production with finding investors and a cast. Callis was cast three days before shooting. Doeac said, "I remember the day we attached William Forsythe to play 'Big John'. His reps asked that we place his salary in escrow and we hadn't raised the full budget yet. What do you do in that circumstance? Well, if you want William Forsythe in your movie, you put the money in the bank".

Principal photography took place between June and July 2015 primarily in Doleac's hometown of Hattiesburg, Mississippi. Other Mississippi cities featured are: Hot Coffee, Lumberton, Seminary and Sumrall. Ben McBurnett shot the film with a Arri Alexa using a re-purposed cooke lens to achieve a vintage look.

== Release ==
In February 2016, Uncork'd Entertainment acquired North American rights to the film. The Hollow had a limited theatrical release on October 7, 2016. It grossed $2,848 its opening weekend from 12 theaters and went on to make a total of $3,755. The DVD and Blu-ray was released on January 3, 2017.

== Reception ==
On the review aggregator website Rotten Tomatoes, 40% of 5 critics' reviews are positive, with an average rating of 5.2/10.

Marnie Schleicher writing for SF Weekly said, "There are numerous ways that a vanity project like this can go off the rails, but Miles Doleac's The Hollow is a fun little genre potboiler that gets it right". Brian Orndorf of Blu-ray.com gave the film a four out of ten rating, writing The Hollow goes on and on, dragging past the two hour mark for reasons not understood, unless Doleac really is a Sayles admirer. The feature tends to suffocate potentially interesting concerns through repetition and inertia, and clichés periodically dominate. It's certainly a well-shot picture from cinematographer Ben McBurnett, and the main cast makes an effort to feel everything down to the last drop, keeping the movie at least semi-compelling in small doses".

Noel Murray of the Los Angeles Times gave praise to the acting and dialogue but criticized the long runtime. He ended his review with, "Give Doleac credit for having the intelligence and ambition to make The Hollow more than just another sensationalistic potboiler filled with sex, drugs and violence. But a film this sordid shouldn't be so tedious". The Hollywood Reporter's Justin Lowe gave a negative review. He wrote "What emerges is a rather unremarkable backwoods noir lacking the distinctive characters and stylistic flourishes that might set it apart from dozens of other crime dramas popping up on VOD genre menus".

The film won three awards (Best Actor, Supporting Actor, and Cinematography) at the 2016 Long Island International Film Expo.
