= Demigod (film) =

- Directed by: Miles Doleac
- Written by: Miles Doleac; Michael Donovan Horn
- Produced by: Jonathan Buchanan; Neil Evans; Nathaniel Upshaw; Ryan Valdez
- Starring: Rachel Nichols; Yohance Myles; Miles Doleac; Lindsay Anne Williams; Elena Sanchez; Rachel Ryals
- Cinematography: Nathan Tape
- Edited by: Keith Jared Hollingsworth
- Music by: Clifton Hyde
- Production companies: Artist Vodka Films; Historia Films
- Distributed by: Gravitas Ventures
- Release date: 9 October 2021 (US)
- Running time: 83 minutes
- Country: United States
- Language: English

Demigod is a 2021 American horror film directed by Miles Doleac, starring Doleac, Rachel Nichols, Yohance Myles, Lindsay Anne Williams, Elena Sanchez and Rachel Ryals.

== Cast ==
- Rachel Nichols as Robin Murphy
- Yohance Myles as Leo Murphy
- Miles Doleac as Arthur Fuchs
- Lindsay Anne Williams as Hettica
- Elena Sanchez as Latara
- Rachel Ryals as Amalia Fuchs
- Jeremy London as Karl Schaffer
- Sarah S. Fisher as Fell
- Tatiana Piper as Katya
- Manon Pages as Tabitha
- Sherri Eakin as Pregnant Woman

== Release ==
The film received a limited theatrical release and a VOD release on 15 October 2021.

== Reception ==
On Rotten Tomatoes, the film has an approval rating of 63% based on 16 reviews. Thom Ernst of Original Cin rated the film a "B+" and wrote that it "works because of the movie's dedicated performances, some fittingly extreme (the witches and demons) and others reliably frightened." Jon Mendelsohn of Comic Book Resources wrote that while the film is "not groundbreaking by any means", it is "an unpredictable, entertainingly gory ride that rests somewhere between schlock and quality independent cinema".

Martin Unsworth of Starburst rated the film 3 stars out of 5 and called it an "entertaining low budget shocker that’s worth a look." Cody Hamman of JoBlo.com gave the film a score of 5/10 and called it "disappointingly underwhelming". Kelly Vance of the East Bay Express wrote that while the film "has a writing problem and is too slowly paced for its weight."
