= Demons (2017 film) =

- Directed by: Miles Doleac
- Written by: Miles Doleac
- Produced by: Miles Doleac; Ryan H. Jackson; Kevin McGrail; Lindsay Anne Williams
- Starring: Kristina Emerson; John Schneider; Andrew Divoff; Steven Brand; Gary Grubbs; Miles Doleac; Yohance Myles; Lindsay Anne Williams; Jessica Harthcock
- Cinematography: Ben McBurnett
- Edited by: Keith Jared Hollingsworth
- Music by: Clifton Hyde; Darren Morze
- Production company: Historia Films
- Distributed by: Uncork'd Entertainment
- Release date: October 6, 2017 (United States)
- Running time: 105 minutes
- Country: United States
- Language: English

Demons is a 2017 horror film written, directed, produced by Miles Doleac. The film also stars Doleac along with Lindsay Anne Williams, Steven Brand, Andrew Divoff, John Schneider, Gary Grubbs, Kristina Emerson, and Jessica Harthcock.

== Plot ==
Eight years ago, Father Colin Hampstead presided over an aborted exorcism that resulted in the gruesome death of seventeen-year-old Jewel Grant, in rural Louisiana. The deceased girl's older sister, Kayleigh, grew immediately attached to Hampstead and sought him out, at first for grief counseling and then, for more. The once-zealous Father Hampstead soon left the priesthood, disillusioned with religion, but comforted by his love for Kayleigh. Colin and Kayleigh marry, but, on the night of their wedding, Kayleigh has a vision of her dead sister.

Now, Colin Hampstead has become a celebrated fiction writer, specializing in stories about the occult. He and Kayleigh have a daughter, and run a well-known bed and breakfast in Savannah, Georgia. When the couple agrees to host the wedding of one of Colin's old friends, what begins as a jovial reunion turns into something much more macabre, as the seemingly omnipresent ghost of Kayleigh's sister Jewel compels Kayleigh to engage in bizarre, destructive behaviors that endanger the lives of both her friends and herself. Told in two timelines, past and present, the film slowly unravels the unsettling circumstances of Jewel's death, while tracing Kayleigh's struggle to understand why her sister haunts her.

== Cast ==
- Kristina Emerson as Lara
- Miles Doleac as Colin
- John Schneider as Dr. Gerry Connor
- Lindsay Anne Williams as Kayleigh
- Andrew Divoff as Jasper Grant
- Gary Grubbs as Father Joseph Moran
- Jessica Harthcock as Jewel Grant
- Steven Brand as Eddie
- Yohance Myles as Marcus
- Ella Claire Bennett as Jewel Hampstead
- Megan Few as Emmie
- Presley Richardson as Young Jewel
- Caroline Baggerly as Caroline Grant
- Anna Voynik as Young Kayleigh
- Joseph VanZandt as Police Officer

== Release ==
Demons was the first horror movie from Historia Films. It had a limited theatrical release, coupled with day-and-date streaming release on October 6, 2017.

== Reception ==
Demons received mostly mixed reviews from critics, although Noel Murray of the Los Angeles Times had this to say: "The ambitious auteur is getting better at making his novelistic ideas punchy and cinematic, but "Demons" is still a B-movie that takes itself too seriously ... Still, Doleac's forging a niche. His name on a picture is now an indication that genre fans will see something different..." Charlotte Hollingsworth at Morbidly Beautiful wrote "Overall, Demons is an excellent film that brings something fresh to the exorcism genre." Review aggregator Rotten Tomatoes reports an approval rating of 33%, with an average rating of 5/10, based on 6 reviews.
