= Gary Grubbs =

American character actor (born 1949)

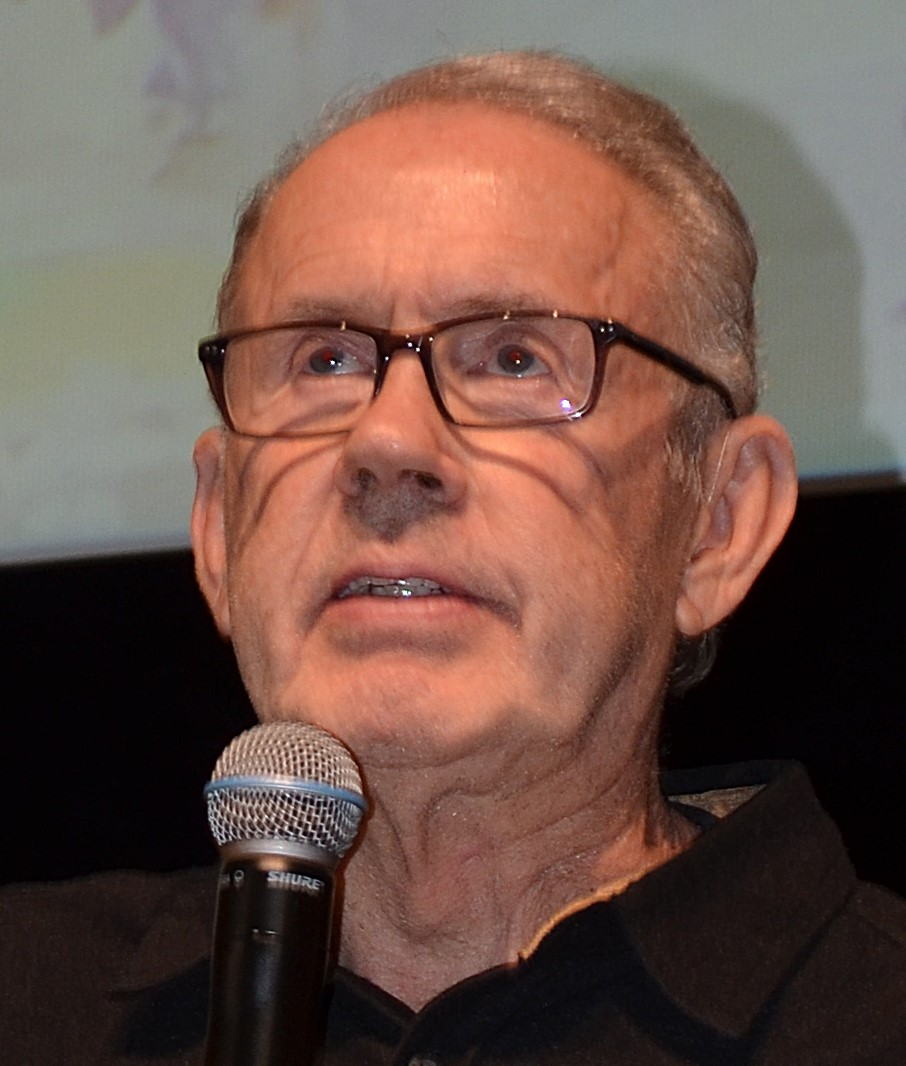
- Grubbs in March 2026
- Born: Jon Gary Grubbs; November 14, 1949 (age 76); Amory, Mississippi, U.S.
- Occupation: Actor
- Years active: 1977–present
- Spouse: Glenda Meadows Grubbs
- Children: 2

Jon Gary Grubbs (born November 14, 1949) is an American character actor who has appeared in 178 credited shows and films since the 1970s and is still working steadily. He is best known as Captain Steven Wiecek in For Love and Honor (1983–1984), Harlin in Will & Grace (1998–1999), and Mr. Dummont in Common Law (2012).

== Career ==
A veteran character actor, Grubbs has amassed over 170 film and television credits since 1977. His best known roles include attorney Al Oser in Oliver Stone's JFK, boatyard owner Phil Beasley in Gone Fishin', Timothy McReady in Double Take, Coach Ralph Miller in Glory Road, the Chief of Police in Bad Lieutenant: Port of Call New Orleans, and Dr. Kemp Clark in Parkland. He appeared as George Russell on The Wonderful World of Disney's 1988 miniseries "Davy Crockett: Rainbow in the Thunder" starring Tim Dunigan.

In the 1990s, Grubbs landed two notable (albeit short-lived) recurring television roles. On Growing Pains, he played George Brower, Luke Brower's (Leonardo DiCaprio) long-lost father, and during the first two seasons of Will & Grace, he played Harlin Polk, Will Truman's (Eric McCormack) number-one client. He also played Cal Stephens, a car dealer who sold Al Bundy a lemon, on Married... with Children.

In the 2001 film Double Take, Grubbs played the role of CIA agent Timothy Jarret McReady. He appeared in the recurring role of Gordon Bullit on the final season of The O.C.

Grubbs also made a cameo on a few episodes of the WB series Angel as Fred's father, Roger Burkle. He had a recurring role on Treme as Richard Desautel, father of chef Janette Desautel (Kim Dickens). In 2012, he appeared in an episode of Criminal Minds as Detective Oren Carr. He currently teaches acting classes.

== Selected filmography ==
=== 1970s ===
- For the Love of Benji (1977) as Hank
- Deadman's Curve (1978) as Lead Singer
- From Here to Eternity (1979) as Pvt. Earl Krebes
- Charlie's Angels (1979, 1 episode) as Second Driver

=== 1980s ===
- Condominium (1980) as First Meteorologist
- The Rockford Files (1980, 1 episode) as Deputy Murray
- Gideon's Trumpet (1980) as Hamilton
- Hill Street Blues (1981, 1 episode) as Trevor Earps
- The Waltons (1981, 1 episode) as Job Moonie
- The Greatest American Hero (1981, 1 episode) as Doyle Casco
- Happy Days (1982, 1 episode) as Jack
- The Border (1982) as Honk
- CHiPs (1982, 1 episode) as Bo
- M*A*S*H (1982, 1 episode) as Lt. Geyer
- The Dukes of Hazzard (1982, 1 episode) as Wade
- Honkytonk Man (1982) as Jim Bob
- Knots Landing (1983) as Salesman
- Three's Company (1983) as Harry
- Silkwood (1983) as Randy Fox
- For Love and Honor (1983–84, 12 episodes) as Captain Steven Wiecek
- The Burning Bed (1984) as District Attorney Herzog
- Fatal Vision (1984) as James Blackburn
- Magnum, P.I. (1984, 1 episode) as Dexter
- Half Nelson (1985, 6 episodes) as Detective Hamil
- The A-Team (1986, 1 episode) as Sheriff Hopkins
- The Golden Girls (1986, 1 episode) as Waiter
- North and South: Book II (1986, 1 episode) as Lt. Pickles
- T. J. Hooker (1986, 1 episode) as Harlan Walker
- Silver Spoons (1986, 1 episode) as Billy
- Matlock (1987, 1 episode) as Reverend S.J. Sweet
- Poker Alice (1987) as Marshal McLean
- Nadine (1987) as Cecil
- Foxfire (1987) as Prince
- And God Created Woman (1988) as Officer Rupert Willis
- 227 (1988, 1 episode) as Chester Jenkins
- Walt Disney's Wonderful World of Color (1988–89, 4 episodes) as George Russell
- Family Ties (1989, 1 episode) as Burt
- Guns of Paradise (1989, 1 episode) as Burt
- Tennessee Waltz (1989) as District Attorney

=== 1990s ===
- Hunter (1990, 1 episode) as Paul Brisco
- Major Dad (1990, 1 episode) as Maj. Buddy Hargrove
- Hull High (1990, 2 episodes) as Mr. Brawley
- Murder, She Wrote (1990, 1 episode) as Mark Berringer
- Evening Shade (1991, 1 episode) as Dean
- Without Warning: The James Brady Story (1991) as Larry Speakes
- JFK (1991) as Al Oser
- Growing Pains (1991–92, 2 episodes) as George Brower
- L.A. Law (1992) as U.S. Marshal William Hopson
- The Ernest Green Story (1993) as Mr. Loomis
- Telling Secrets (1993) as Det. Ron Taylor
- Miracle Child (1993) as John Marshall
- The Positively True Adventures of the Alleged Texas Cheerleader-Murdering Mom (1993) as Detective Helton
- Time Trax (1993, 1 episode) as Elton Travis
- North and South: Book III (1986, 3 episode) as Lt. Pickles
- Midnight Runaround (1994) as Lester Keating
- The X-Files (1995, 1 episode) as Sheriff Tom Arens
- The Stranger Beside Me (1995) as Chief Engineer
- Land's End (1995, 1 episode) as Walter Abbott/Joe Phillips
- Dave's World (1995, 1 episode) as Officer Bailey
- Second Noah (1996, 1 episode) as David Cooper
- Forgotten Sins (1996) as Reverend Ralph Newton
- Boston Common (1996, 1 episode) as Aubrey McLean
- Married... with Children (1987, 1996, 3 episodes) as Delbert in S2 E 1&2. 1996 as Cal Stevens
- Love's Deadly Triangle: The Texas Cadet Murder (1997) as Detective Carl Baker
- Caroline in the City (1997, 1 episode) as Earl
- Gone Fishin' (1997) as Phil Beasly
- Sabrina the Teenage Witch (1997, 1 episode) as Boyd
- JAG (1998, 1 episode) as Air Boss
- Touched by an Angel (1998, 1 episode) as Brother Jim
- ER (1998, 1 episode) as Emmet Chambliss
- Dr. Quinn, Medicine Woman (1998, 1 episode) as Clyde Hawkins
- The X-Files: Fight the Future (1998) as Fire Captain Cooles
- Will & Grace (1998–99, 11 episodes) as Harlin Polk
- Any Day Now (1999, 1 episode) as Bernie
- The Astronaut's Wife (1999) as Director Gerald McCleery

=== 2000s ===
- Beverly Hills, 90210 (2000, 1 episode) as Borst
- Profiler (2000, 1 episode) as Ben Stillwell
- Python (2000) as Sheriff Griffin Wade
- Double Take (2001) as Timothy Jarret McReady
- Spring Break Lawyer (2001) as Senator Claxton
- Angel (2001–04, 4 episodes) as Roger Burkle
- NCIS (2003, 1 episode) as Dr. Elmo Poke
- Runaway Jury (2003) as Leon Dobbs
- One on One (2003, 1 episode) as Jack Crawford
- Ray (2004) as Billy Ray
- Glory Road (2006) as Coach Ralph Miller
- For One Night (2006) as Mr. Thornton
- Not Like Everyone Else (2006) as John Mack Butler
- All the King's Men (2006) as Sheriff Roebuck
- Prison Break (2006, 1 episode) as Senator Holston
- The Last Time (2006) as Toby Margolin
- Déjà Vu (2006) as Lt. Marquette
- The O.C. (2006–07, 6 episodes) as Gordon Bullit
- K-Ville (2007, 1 episode) as Medical Examiner
- Deal (2008) as Mr. Stillman
- My Mom's New Boyfriend (2008) as Police Chief Malone
- Private Valentine: Blonde & Dangerous (2008) as Captain Greer
- In the Electric Mist (2009) as Sheriff Gillis
- Maneater (2009) as Tripper Mason
- Bad Lieutenant: Port of Call New Orleans (2009) as the Chief of Police
- Alabama Moon (2009) as Judge Mackin

=== 2010s ===
- Good Intentions (2010) as Zachary
- The Chameleon (2010) as John Striker
- Revenge of the Bridesmaids (2010) as Lou Wald
- Dirty Girl (2010) as Principal Mulray
- Wizards of Waverly Place (2010, 1 episode) as Pa
- Treme (2010–12, 4 episodes) as Richard Desaulet
- The Chaperone (2011) as Mr. Mobeleski
- Zeke and Luther (2011, 1 episode) as Jackson Cuplic
- Mardi Gras: Spring Break (2011) as Middle-aged Father
- Storm War (2011) as Colonel Neilson
- Bending the Rules (2011) as Clark Gunn
- Battleship (2012) as USAF Chief of Staff
- Hell and Mr. Fudge (2012) as Carl Ketcherside
- Common Law (2012, 12 episode) as Mr. Dumont
- No One Lives (2012) as Harris
- Criminal Minds (2012, 1 episode) as Detective Oren Carr
- Django Unchained (2012) as Bob Gibbs
- Bones (2013, 1 episode) as Dwayne Wilson
- Shadow People (2013) as CDC Director
- The Hot Flashes (2013) as the President of the Board
- Parkland (2013) as Dr. Kemp Clark
- Devil's Knot (2013) as Dale Griffis
- The Mentalist (2014, 1 episode) as Samuel Millman
- Sabotage (2014) as DEA Agent Lou Cantrell
- Wild Card (2014, 1 episode) as Jimmy Weaver
- Left Behind (2014) as Dennis Beese
- Murder in the First (2014–15, 2 episodes) as Richard Furdon
- Project Almanac (2015) as Doctor Lou
- Glee (2015, 1 episode) as Jimbo Wilson
- Convergence (2015) as Security Guard
- The Astronaut Wives Club (2015, 2 episodes) as Cal Butterfield
- Concussion (2015) as FBI Agent Owens
- Scream Queens (2015, 1 episode) as Mr. Swenson
- Free State of Jones (2016) as Prosecutor
- A Sunday Horse (2016) as Coach Walden
- USS Indianapolis: Men of Courage (2016) as Judge Bazemore
- Demons (2017) as Father Joseph Moran
- Let There Be Light (2017) as Dr. Ray Fornier
- LBJ (2017) as Senator Everett Dirksen
- God Bless the Broken Road (2018)

== Personal life ==
Grubbs resides in Hattiesburg, Mississippi, with his wife, Glenda (former Miss Mississippi Glenda Meadows), and their two children, Molly and Logan.
