= Andrew Divoff =

American actor and producer (born 1955)

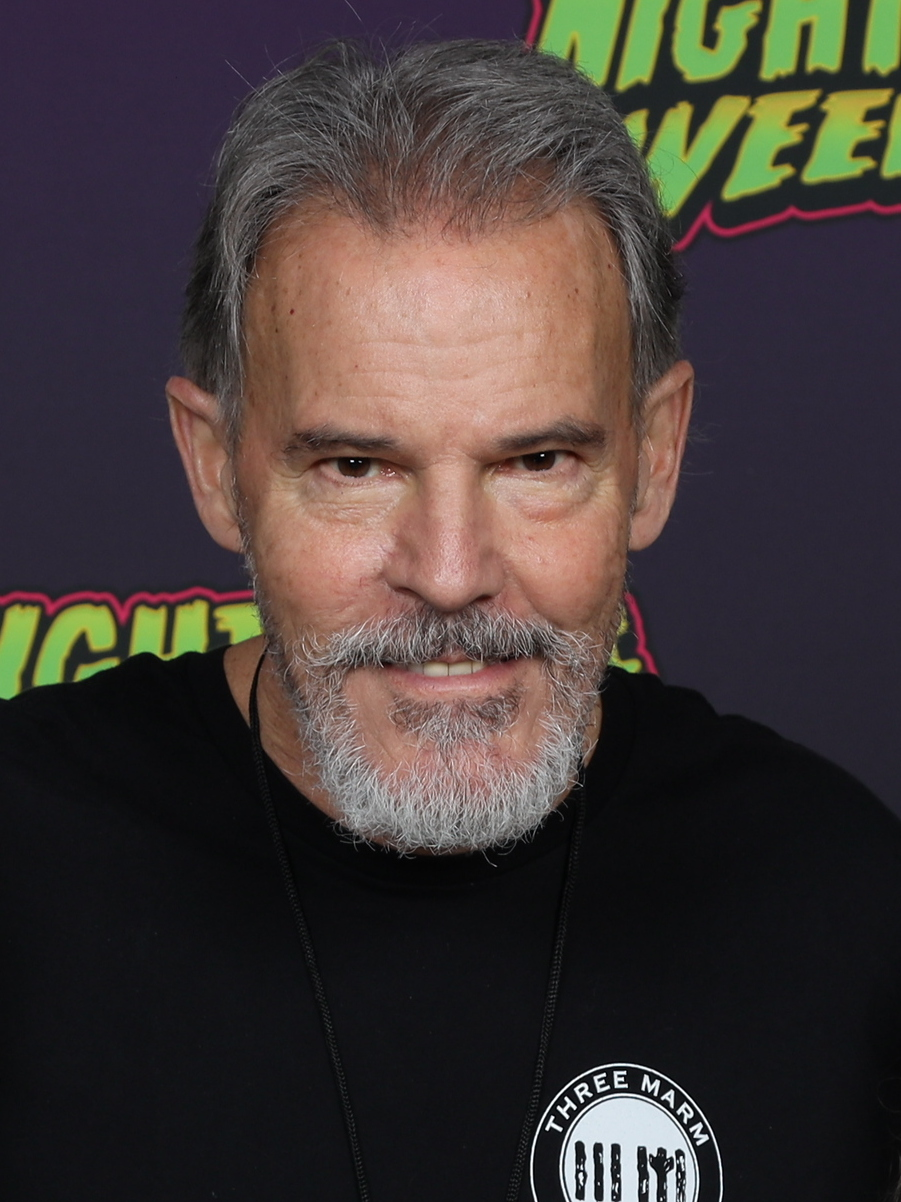
- Divoff at Nightmare Weekend Richmond in 2023
- Born: Andrew Daniel Divoff; July 2, 1955 (age 71); San Tomé, Anzoátegui, Venezuela
- Occupations: Actor; producer
- Years active: 1983–present
- Website: Official website

Andrew Daniel Divoff (born July 2, 1955) is a Venezuelan actor and producer. Divoff has played many villains in film and on television, including drug cartel leaders, terrorists, and organized crime bosses, though he is best known for playing the evil Djinn/Nathaniel Demerest in the first two Wishmaster films. Other noteworthy film and television roles include the villains Luis Cali in Toy Soldiers, Cherry Ganz in Another 48 Hrs., Ernesto Mendoza in A Low Down Dirty Shame, Boris Bazylev in Air Force One, M (Mephistopheles) in Faust: Love of the Damned, Ivan Sarnoff in CSI: Miami, Mikhail Bakunin in Lost, and Karakurt in The Blacklist.

== Early life and education ==
Divoff was born in San Tomé, Anzoátegui, Venezuela. His father was Russian. His parents worked as wildcatters for Exxon, and met because Divoff's maternal grandfather was his father's supervisor. Divoff describes himself as having been an introvert and an outsider during his childhood in Caracas, Venezuela, saying that he had experienced near-daily physical fights and bullying from other children. Divoff's first language was Spanish, but he learned English in Venezuela.

After Divoff's parents divorced, he emigrated with his sister and mother to northern California when he was 10 years old. He was supposed to enter the fifth grade, but was held back because of his heavy accent. Divoff said that this experience was a catalyst for his obsession with languages. When he was in the seventh grade, Divoff's school screened films in class, including Seven Days in May, which he found inspiring. Divoff began envisioning himself as the hero in such films, and told his friends that he wanted to become an actor who did his own stunts.

Divoff's mother worked for the State Department, and he moved with her when she was transferred to Spain. Divoff lived five years in Vilassar de Mar (Catalonia), between 1973 and 1977, feeling himself to be Catalan too. While in Spain, Divoff tutored English-speaking students in Spanish and attended the University of Barcelona, where he completed a research project on linguistics in The Canterbury Tales. He transferred his credits to Georgetown University, where he continued his study of languages and linguistics, and has resided in the United States ever since. Divoff did not graduate from Georgetown University, instead deciding to take a year off to help his father settle in California for retirement.

== Career ==
After returning to California, Divoff worked as a dispatcher for a limousine company, eventually becoming a limo driver in 1983. During his evenings off, Divoff took acting lessons; his teachers included Milton Katselas, director of Butterflies Are Free. His first role was that of a Russian guard for a 1986 episode of Misfits of Science. Divoff won the role via a telephone audition, in which was asked to scream, "Stop that truck!" in Russian and then in English with a Russian accent. His first film role was in the 1986 cult horror film Neon Maniacs, in which he played a demonic surgeon. Divoff had a falling out with the filmmakers due to what he believed constituted animal abuse: real dead pigeons were used in one of the film's scenes.

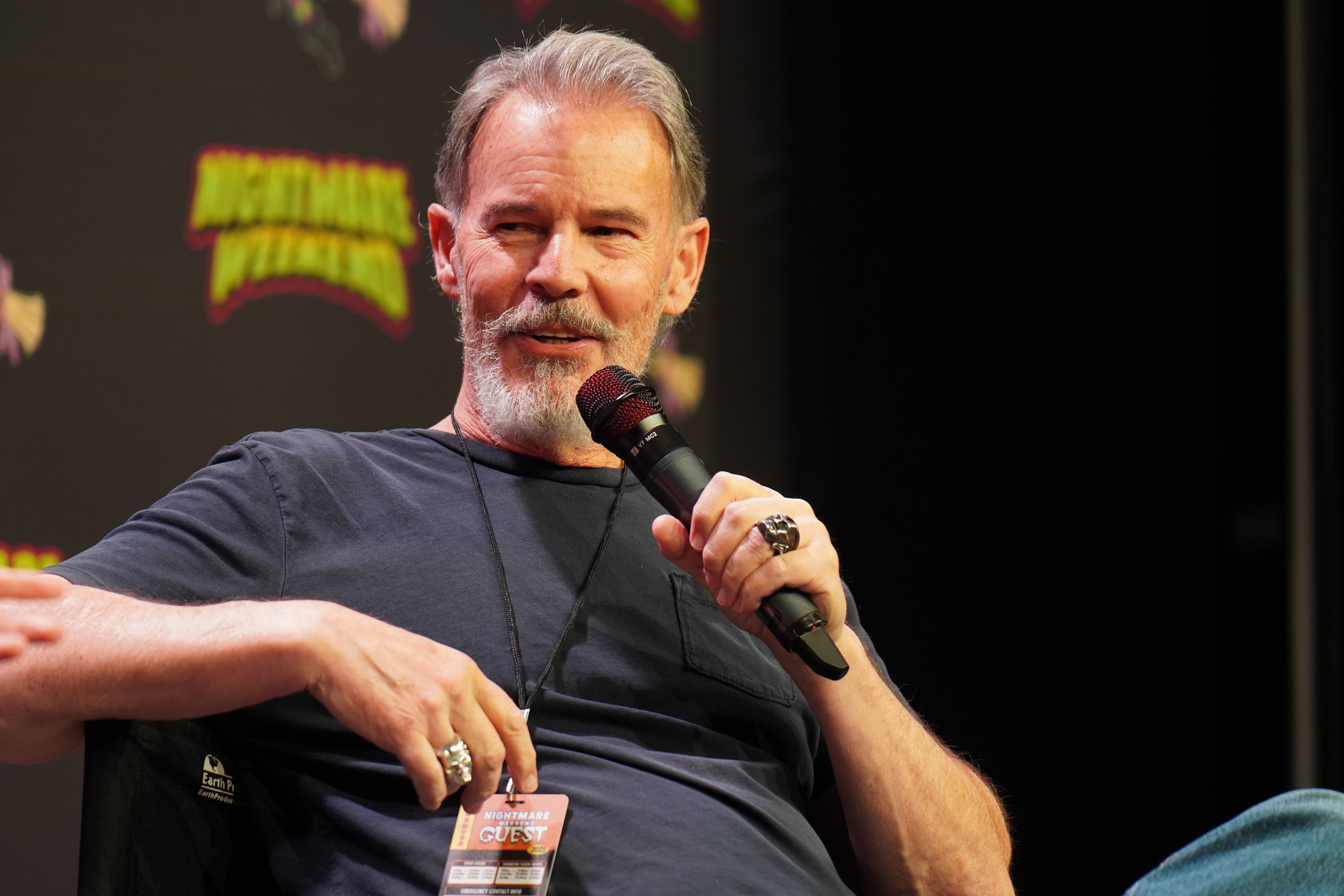
Andrew Divoff at Nightmare Weekend Richmond VA 2023

Divoff's subsequent TV appearances in the 1980s included bit parts and work as an extra in The A-Team, The Twilight Zone, MacGyver, Scarecrow and Mrs. King, and Matlock. His multilingual skills and international background helped win him some of these early roles. When auditioning for a guest role as a limo driver for Thirtysomething, Divoff pretended to be a Russian immigrant, and maintained the farce on set until the filming ended, dropping the Russian accent entirely.

His breakthrough role came in 1990, when he was cast as the outlaw biker "Cherry Ganz" in Another 48 Hrs. He was vacationing in Berlin when he received the call that he won the role. He went out to celebrate at a nearby pub and then attended the tearing down of the Berlin Wall, grabbing a sledgehammer and participating in the Wall's destruction. Divoff marks Another 48 Hrs. as the film that allowed him to quit his limo driving job and focus on acting. Following Another 48 Hours, Divoff landed antagonist roles in other significant projects, primarily in the action genre. These projects included Toy Soldiers and A Low Down Dirty Shame. In rare instances, Divoff portrayed the protagonist or hero, such as in Running Cool and Interceptor.

In 1997 Air Force One and Wishmaster were released. In his portrayal of a Russian terrorist henchman in Air Force One, as in other films, Divoff performed his own stunts. Divoff stated in an interview that he has performed his own stunts so frequently that it is often assumed that he used to be a professional stuntman; however, this is not the case. He simply preferred to perform his own stunts because it gave him complete control over every aspect of his characters.

Divoff played the nefarious "Djinn" in the first two films of the Wishmaster series. Wishmaster was directed by special effects artist Robert Kurtzman, and featured cameo appearances by several popular horror actors. Divoff reprised the role as the Djinn in Wishmaster 2: Evil Never Dies, directed by Jack Sholder. In 1999, Divoff and a friend penned a script for a third film, Wishmaster: The Third Millennium, which had a Y2K theme involving "American warship in Asia and it is hit by a missile, and all hell breaks loose. Incidentally, there is a meeting going on at the UN and monsters come to life right there and go through the crowd and start ripping it up." Divoff's script also required lavish special effects, and featured "gargoyles on buildings coming to life and coming down into the street." Divoff's script wasn't optioned, and he ultimately did not return for Wishmaster 3 or Wishmaster 4, saying he believed those projects did not have the capacity for impressive special effects due to a significantly lower budget, and because he felt that these sequels didn't have the love for the franchise of the earlier entries.

Divoff later reunited with Robert Kurtzman for the "grindhouse"- inspired horror film The Rage, and has since appeared in several other horror films, including the Midnight Syndicate's indie horror flick The Dead Matter as the lead villain. in The Hatred as a former Nazi, and in the Miles Doleac film Demons as a religious zealot.

Divoff had a recurring role on Lost (Seasons 3 and 6, 2006–07 and 2010 respectively) as Mikhail Bakunin, a Russian member of the Others who lived in the Flame station of the DHARMA Initiative (in the episodes "The Cost of Living", "Enter 77" and "Par Avion") and later appeared, in flashback (in "One of Us"), and then reappeared (in the episodes "D.O.C.", "The Man Behind the Curtain", "Through the Looking Glass", and "The Package").

In 2008–09, on Season 7 of CSI: Miami, Divoff played "Ivan Sarnoff" in four episodes ("Seeing Red", "Target Specific", "And They're Offed", and "Raging Cannibal"). In 2015–16, Divoff had a recurring role as Karakurt in six episodes of Season 3 of The Blacklist (episodes "The Djinn", "Sir Crispin Crandall", "Zal Bin Hasaan", "Kings of the Highway", "The Director", and "The Director: Conclusion"). Other television guest appearances include roles on The A-Team, JAG, Highlander: The Series, Walker, Texas Ranger, Criminal Minds, Law & Order: Special Victims Unit, Burn Notice, Alias, Nikita, The Strain, and Colony.

== Business ventures and philanthropy ==
Divoff has pursued a number of other business ventures in addition to professional acting, and uses many of these businesses as a springboard for philanthropic and environmentalist efforts. In the early 1990s, he was a co-owner of the blues bar and restaurant Sunset Social Club.

Divoff is passionate about environmental issues and water rights, and believes that the best form of activism is simply to help people in need. Several years after his move from actor William Boyd's former home in Hollywood to the Lake Arrowhead region of the San Bernardino Mountains in 1992, Divoff formed a logging crew during a time when he described acting opportunities as scarce. Divoff and his crew focused on removing trees that were dead or dying due to a pine beetle infestation. Divoff later became a partner in Verdant Resource and in Alpine Village Water Company that serves a nearby mountain community. Verdant Resource holds a patent for a wind-powered water pump. With the help of a government grant, Divoff and the other partners at the water company provided running water to a small community using Verdant's pump technology.

In 2014, Divoff developed his own craft beer, the Djinn's Hellabrew, which he has sold to benefit charities, including Smile Train, Operation Provider, and the Hollywood Police Activities League. In 2017, Divoff formed his own brewing company, Three Marm Brewing, a "marm" being the part of a tree trunk that forks into two or more trunks. The partners of Three Marm Brewing are predominantly members of Divoff's former logging crew. Divoff and his partners are planning to open a taproom in Crestline, California, and have other new beer flavors in development, including the Logger Lager and Mystic Mast Stout.

== Personal life ==
Divoff can speak eight languages: English, Spanish, Portuguese, Catalan, French, Italian, German, and Russian. At one time he also knew Romanian, but forgot it through lack of use. Divoff's multilingual skills are showcased in many of his film and television roles.

== Filmography ==
=== Film ===
Year	Title	Role	Notes
1986	Neon Maniacs	Doc	
1988	Mac and Me	Police Officer	
1990	The Hunt for Red October	Andrei Amalric	
1990	An American Summer	Dode	
1990	Another 48 Hrs.	Cherry Ganz	
1990	Graveyard Shift	Danson	
1991	Toy Soldiers	Luis Cali	
1992	Back in the U.S.S.R.	Dimitro	
1992	Interceptor	Capt. Winfield	
1993	Running Cool	Bone	
1993	Extreme Justice	Angel	
1994	A Low Down Dirty Shame	Mendoza	
1994	Dangerous Touch	Johnnie	
1994	Oblivion	Red Eye / Einstein	
1994	Hong Kong 97	Malcolm Goodchild	
1995	The Random Factor	Jake Anders	
1995	The Stranger	Angel	
1995	Xtro 3: Watch the Skies	Captain Fetterman	
1995	Magic Island	Blackbeard	
1996	Oblivion 2: Backlash	Jaggar / Einstein	
1996	For Which He Stands	Paulo	
1996	Adrenalin: Fear the Rush	Sterns	
1996	Nemesis 4: Death Angel	Bernardo	
1997	Blast	Omodo	
1997	Air Force One	Boris Bazylev	
1997	Touch Me	Dr. Vachenko	Credited as Andy Divoff
1997	Wishmaster	The Djinn/Nathaniel Demerest	
1998	Crossfire	Dekova	
1998	Captured	Robert Breed	
1999	Stealth Fighter	Roberto Menendez	
1999	Wishmaster 2: Evil Never Dies	The Djinn/Nathaniel Demerest	
2000	Down 'n Dirty	Jimmy	
2000	Lockdown	Perez	Uncredited
2000	Faust: Love of the Damned	M	
2001	The Rage Within	Shane	
2001	Knight Club	Grigori Krukov	
2001	Blue Hill Avenue	Detective Tyler	
2003	The Librarians	Marcos	
2004	Forbidden Warrior	Ujis-Aka	
2004	Moscow Heat	Secretary Weston	
2005	Dr. Rage	Timothy Straun	
2005	Sharkskin 6	Eddie	
2006	American Dreamz	Chinese Translator	
2007	Chicago Massacre: Richard Speck	Jack Whitaker	
2007	Treasure Raiders	Cronin	
2007	The Rage	Dr. Viktor Vasilienko	
2008	Indiana Jones and the Kingdom of the Crystal Skull	Russian Soldier Grant	
2008	Boston Strangler: The Untold Story	Det. John Marsden	
2009	Ballistica	Dragomir	
2009	Magic Man	Rudolph Treadwell	
2010	Shadows in Paradise	Lt. Stronach	
2010	The Dead Matter	Vellich	
2011	Slip and Fall	Dean Dickman	
2012	Night of the Living Dead 3D: Re-Animation	Gerald Tovar Jr	
2013	The Immigrant	Tolik	
2014	Bad Asses	Leandro Herrera	
2014	Pretty Fine Things	Dr. Murray	
2017	The Hatred	Samuel Sears	
2017	Demons	Jasper Grant	
2019	Vault	Buddy Woonsocket	
2024	Camp Pleasant Lake	Evil Man	

=== Video games ===
Year	Title	Role	Notes
2008	Command & Conquer: Red Alert 3	General Nikolai Krukov	
2008	Lost: Via Domus	Mikhail Bakunin	
2010	Call of Duty: Black Ops	Lev Kravchenko	
2012	Call of Duty: Black Ops II	Lev Kravchenko	
2020	Call of Duty: Black Ops Cold War	Lev Kravchenko	

=== Television ===
Year	Title	Role	Notes
1986	Misfits of Science	Guard	Episode: "Grand Elusion"
1986	The Twilight Zone	Vladimir	Episode: "Need to Know/Red Snow"
1986	The A-Team		Episodes: "Firing Line" and "Dishpan Man"
1987	MacGyver	Russian Guard	Episode: "Soft Touch"
1987	Matlock	Federal Agent	Episode: "The Reporter"
1986–87	Scarecrow and Mrs. King	Edgar Russian Guard Russian Soldier	3 episodes
1987	Hooperman	Foreign Suspect	Episode:"John Doe, We Hardly Knew Ye"
1989	Thirtysomething	Limo Driver	Episode: "Success"
1989	HeartBeat	Yuri	Episode: "From Russia with Love"
1989	Out on the Edge	Luke	Television film
1989	Breaking Point	Aide	Television film
1989	Fear Stalk	Man	Television film
1990	By Dawn's Early Light	Russian Premier's Assistant (voice only)	Television film
1993	The Adventures of Brisco County, Jr.	Blackbeard LaCutte	Episode: "Pirates!"
1996	Deadly Voyage	Romachenko	Television film
1996	Tarzan: The Epic Adventures	Nicholai Rockoff	2 episodes
1992, 1996	Highlander: The Series	Bryan Slade, Gavriel Larca	2 episodes
1996– 1997	EZ Streets	Andre 'Frenchie' Desormeaux	3 episodes
1997– 1998	Conan the Adventurer	General Goroth	3 episodes
1998	Acapulco H.E.A.T.	The Raven	2 episodes
1998	Killers in the House	Delaney Breckett	Television film
1997, 2000	Nash Bridges	Carl Dugan Blackbeard	2 episodes
1995–2000	Walker, Texas Ranger	Carlos Darius, Rudy Mendoza, Alberto Cardoza	3 episodes
2001	UC: Undercover	Martin Ritger	Episode "Of Fathers and Sons"
2001	The Agency	Colonel Grachev	Episode "Deadline"
2002	Dracula	Doctor	Miniseries
2002, 2005	JAG	Russian Captain Col. Fadil Najjar	2 episodes
2005	Alias	Lucien Nisard	2 episodes
2006	The Unit	The Major	Episode: "True Believers"
2008	Burn Notice	Ivan	Episode: "Comrades"
2008	Law & Order: Special Victims Unit	Andre Bushido	Episode: "Wildlife"
2008	Leverage	Sergei	Episode: "The Marriage Job"
2009	Criminal Minds	Dad	Episode: "Bloodline"
2008–09	CSI: Miami	Ivan Sarnoff	Recurring; Season 7
2006–07, 2010	Lost	Mikhail Bakunin	Recurring; Seasons 3–6
2010	The Good Guys	Pedro	Episode: "Pilot"
2013	Nikita	Krieg	Episode: "Reunion"
2014	The Strain	Peter Bishop	Episode: "Night Zero"
2015–16	The Blacklist	Karakurt	Recurring; Season 3
2017	Colony	Ambassador King	Episode: "Lost Boy"
2020	Perry Mason	Al Howard	Upcoming
2020	Primitive	Detective Carlsen	Episode 1
