= John Cullum =

American actor and singer (b. 1930)

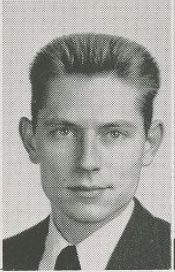
- Cullum in 1953
- Born: March 2, 1930 (age 96); Knoxville, Tennessee, U.S.
- Education: Knoxville High School; University of Tennessee
- Occupations: Actor, singer
- Years active: 1956–present
- Spouse: Emily Frankel (m. 1959; died 2024)
- Children: JD Cullum

John Cullum (born March 2, 1930) is an American actor and singer. He has appeared in many stage musicals and dramas, including Shenandoah (1975) and On the Twentieth Century (1978), winning the Tony Award for Best Leading Actor in a Musical for each. In 1966 he gained his first Tony nomination as the lead in On a Clear Day You Can See Forever, in which he introduced the title song, and more recently received Tony nominations for Urinetown The Musical (2002) (Best Lead Actor in a Musical) and as Best Featured Actor in the revival of 110 in the Shade (2007).

Outside the theatre world, Cullum is best known for his role as tavern owner Holling Vincoeur in the television drama series Northern Exposure, for which he was nominated for the Primetime Emmy Award for Outstanding Supporting Actor in a Drama Series. He was featured in fifteen episodes of the NBC television series ER as Dr. Mark Greene's father. He played farmer Jim Dahlberg in the landmark television drama The Day After. He made multiple guest appearances on Law & Order and Law & Order: Special Victims Unit as attorney/judge Barry Moredock, and appeared as Big Mike in several episodes of The Middle. He appeared as Senator Beau Carpenter on the CBS series Madam Secretary.

== Life and career ==
=== Early years and personal life ===
Cullum was born on March 2, 1930, in Knoxville, Tennessee. He attended Knoxville High School and the University of Tennessee. He played on the university's Southeastern Conference championship tennis team and was a member of Phi Gamma Delta. He starred in "Chucky Jack", an outdoor drama about Tennessee Governor John Sevier, at the old Hunter Hills Theater in Gatlinburg.

Cullum was married to Emily Frankel from 1959 until her death in 2024. They have one son, JD Cullum (John David Cullum), who is also an actor.

=== Acting career ===
He made his Broadway debut as Sir Dinadan in the Alan Jay Lerner/Frederick Loewe musical Camelot in 1960. He also understudied Richard Burton (King Arthur) and Roddy McDowall (Arthur's son Mordred), going on four times when Burton became ill and succeeding McDowall. He went on to play Laertes opposite Burton's 1964 Broadway performance as Hamlet (and in the film version of the production) and in Burton's final Broadway appearance in Noël Coward's Private Lives in 1983.

In 1965, he was called in to replace Louis Jourdan during the Boston tryout of the musical On a Clear Day You Can See Forever. It was his first starring role on Broadway, netting him a Theatre World Award and his first Tony Award nomination. The original cast album received a Grammy Award (presented to lyricist Alan Jay Lerner and composer Burton Lane).

He portrayed Edward Rutledge of South Carolina in the Broadway musical 1776, providing a dramatic highlight with his performance of "Molasses to Rum," a tirade against the hypocrisy of some Northerners over the slave trade ("They don't keep slaves, but they are willing to be considerable carriers of slaves to others. They're willing – for the shilling.") Cullum had been the third Rutledge on Broadway, but played the role the longest and repeated it for the 1972 film.

He is well known for premiering the role of Charlie Anderson in the musical Shenandoah, which began at Goodspeed Opera House, Connecticut in 1974. Cullum won the Tony, Drama Desk and Outer Critics Circle Awards when the show was produced on Broadway in 1975. He also played the role at Wolf Trap, Virginia, in June 1976, opened the national tour for 3 weeks in Fall 1977 in Chicago, and starred in the limited run Broadway revival in 1989.

He followed Shenandoah by playing the maniacal Broadway producer Oscar Jaffee in the 1978 musical On the Twentieth Century, opposite Madeline Kahn and later Judy Kaye, earning his second Tony Award. He received his fourth Tony nomination in 2002 for originating the role of evil moneygrubber corporate president Caldwell B. Cladwell in Urinetown The Musical. He earned his fifth Tony nomination in the 2007 revival of 110 in the Shade, playing H.C. Curry, father to Audra McDonald's Lizzie.

Cullum was cast as Captain America in a comedic musical planned for 1986. The project was eventually canceled, though Cullum performed one of the show’s songs (“Nobody Asked Me to Lead a Parade This Year”) at Broadway Applauds Lincoln Center, a benefit concert.

In 2003, Cullum co-starred with Northern Exposure castmate Barry Corbin in Blackwater Elegy, a short film written by Matthew Porter and co-directed by Porter and Joe O'Brien.

Later Broadway appearances include the title role of William Shakespeare's Cymbeline, at Lincoln Center in 2007 and August: Osage County, by Tracy Letts for the week of September 16, 2008, and then since November 11, 2008.

In addition to enjoying a long stage career, he is well known to television audiences for his regular role as Holling Vincoeur on the quirky CBS series Northern Exposure, his extended appearances on the NBC medical drama ER as Mark Greene's father, and on Law & Order: Special Victims Unit as constitutional lawyer and later judge, Barry Moredock. Cullum has also appeared as Lucky Strike executive Lee Garner, Sr. on AMC's Mad Men. He appeared as Leap Day William, the embodiment of the fictional Leap Day national holiday, in the "Leap Day" episode of the sixth season of NBC's 30 Rock.

John Cullum appeared on Broadway in The Scottsboro Boys (2010), a musical by Kander and Ebb about a notorious miscarriage of justice in the American South in the 1930s. The Scottsboro Boys was directed by Susan Stroman, with Cullum as the only non-African-American member of the cast.

John Cullum was inducted into the Theatre Hall of Fame in 2007.

In 2015 Cullum appeared and sang in the satirical B&W period movie-musical footage of Daddy's Boy on Unbreakable Kimmy Schmidt. The "forgotten footage" features comically incestuous lyrics set in an innocent context that apes classic 1930's films.

Cullum, then an octogenarian, joined the cast of Waitress as Joe on October 12, 2017, replacing Larry Marshall.

== Acting credits ==
=== Theater ===
Year	Title	Role	Notes
1956-1957	Saint Joan	Ensemble	Broadway
1960-1962	Camelot	Sir Dinadan u/s King Arthur	Broadway
1960-1962	Camelot	Mordred u/s King Arthur	Broadway
1962	Infidel Caesar	Cassios	Broadway
1963	The Rehearsal	u/s for The Count, Hero	Broadway
1964	Hamlet	Laertes	Broadway
1965-1966	On a Clear Day You Can See Forever	Dr. Mark Bruckner	Broadway
1967	Man of La Mancha	Miguel Cervantes/Don Quixote	Broadway Replacement
1970-1972	1776	Edward Rutledge	Broadway Replacement
1972	Vivat! Vivat Regina!	Lord Bothwell	Broadway Replacement
1973	Carousel	Billy Bigelow	
1974-1977	Shenandoah	Charlie Anderson	Broadway
1977	The Trip Back Down	Bobby Horvath	Broadway
1978-1979	On the Twentieth Century	Oscar Jaffee	Broadway
1979-1982	Deathtrap	Sidney Bruhl	Broadway Replacement
1982	Whistler	James McNeill Whistler	One-man show at Provincetown Playhouse
1983	Private Lives	Victor Prynne s/b Elyot Chase	Broadway
1985-1986	Doubles	Guy	Broadway
1986	The Boys in Autumn	Huck	Broadway
1986-1987	You Never Can Tell	Waiter	Broadway Replacement
1989	Shenandoah	Charlie Anderson	Broadway Revival
1990-1991	Aspects of Love	George Dillingham	Broadway Replacement
1993	Camelot	King Arthur	
1995	Man of La Mancha	Miguel Cervantes/Don Quixote	US Tour
1995	All My Sons	Joe Keller	Off-Broadway
1996	Show Boat	Cap'n Andy Hawkes	Broadway Replacement
1999	South Pacific	Emile de Becque	
2001-2003	Urinetown	Caldwell B. Cladwell	Broadway
2004	Sin: a Cardinal Deposed	Cardinal Law	
2005	Purlie	Ol' Cap'n Cotchipee	Off-Broadway
2006-2007	Dr. Seuss' How the Grinch Stole Christmas!	Old Max	Broadway
2007	110 in the Shade	H.C. Curry	Broadway
2007-2008	Cymbeline	King Cymbeline	Broadway
2008-2009	August: Osage County	Beverly Weston	Broadway Replacement
2010	The Scottsboro Boys	The Interlocutor / Judge / Governor of Alabama	Broadway
2011	Measure for Measure	Vincentio	Shakespeare in the Park
2011	All's Well That Ends Well	The Duke	Shakespeare in the Park
2013	Carousel	Starkeeper / Dr. Seldon	Concert
2013	She Loves Me	Mr. Maraczek	Concert
2014	Casa Valentina	Terry	Broadway
2017-2018	Waitress	Old Joe	Broadway Replacement
2019	Into the Wild	Performer	Playwrights Horizons
2021	An Accidental Star	Himself	Vineyard Theatre

=== Film ===
Year	Title	Role	Notes
1963	All the Way Home	Andrew	
1964	Richard Burton's Hamlet	Laertes	
1966	Hawaii	Rev. Immanuel Quigley	
1972	1776	Edward Rutledge	
1983	The Act	The President	
1983	The Prodigal	Elton Stuart	
1983	Marie	Deputy Attorney General	
1987	Sweet Country	Ben	
1998	The Secret Life of Algernon	Algernon Pendleton	
1998	Ricochet River	Link Curren	
1999	Held Up	Jack	
1999	Inherit the Wind	Judge Merle Coffey	
2003	Blackwater Elegy	J.T.	
2006	The Notorious Bettie Page	Preacher in Nashville	
2006	The Night Listener	Pap Noone	
2010	All Good Things	Richard Panatierre	
2011	The Conspirator	Justice Wylie	
2013	Kill Your Darlings	Professor Steeves	
2013	Kilimanjaro	Milton Sr	
2013	Adult World	Stan	
2014	Before We Go	Harry	
2014	Love Is Strange	Father Raymond	
2014	The Historian	Brigston Hadley	
2016	Christine	Bob Anderson	
2019	Jungleland	Yates	
2021	The Acolyte	Arch Pontifex	Short film
2022	Simchas and Sorrows	Nate	

=== Television ===
Year	Title	Role	Notes
1963–65	The Defenders	Jeremiah/Michael Yager/Angel Mauru	3 episodes
1964	The Doctors	Pa Thatcher	5 episodes
1964	The DuPont Show of the Week	Hugh	Episode: "The Gambling Heart"
1966–67	The Edge of Night	David "Giddy" Gideon	Recurring
1967	Androcles and the Lion	The Captain	TV movie
1969	One Life to Live	Artie Duncan	Recurring
1969	The Outcasts	Pale Hands Montaine	Episode: "And Then There Was One"
1971	You Are There	William Clark	Episode: "Lewis and Clark Expedition"
1973	The Man Without a Country	Aaron Burr	TV movie
1978	Roll of Thunder, Hear My Cry	Mr. Jamison	TV movie
1981	Great Performances	Walter/Lawyer Royall	2 episodes: "Edith Wharton: Looking Back" & "Summer"
1981	American Playhouse	Himself/Carl Sandburg	Episode: "Carl Sandburg: Echoes and Silences
1983	The Day After	Jim Dahlberg	TV movie
1986	The Equalizer	Stuart Cane	Episode: "Unpunished Crimes"
1986	Spenser: For Hire	Anthony Bennett	Episode: "Rockabye Baby"
1987–88	Buck James	Henry Carliner	Main role
1987	The Equalizer	Judge Howard Tainey	Episode: "Carnal Persuasion"
1988	Shootdown	Robert Allardyce	TV movie
1989	Quantum Leap	John O'Malley	Episode: "To Catch A Falling Star"
1989	Money, Power, Murder.	Rev. Endicott	TV movie
1990–95	Northern Exposure	Holling Vincoeur	Main role, 110 episodes
1992	With a Vengeance	Fred Mitchell	TV movie
1992	Mattie's Waltz	Clyde	TV movie
1996	Aaahh!!! Real Monsters	Millard (voice)	2 episodes
1997	All My Children	Judge Carl Breen	1 episode
1997	Nothing Sacred	Joe Keneally	Episode: "Mixed Blessings"
1997	Touched by an Angel	Mark Twain	Episode: "It Came Upon A Midnight Clear"
1997, 2001	Law & Order	Harold Dorning/Bernard Powell, Sr.	2 episodes: "Menace" and "Soldier of Fortune"
1997–2000	ER	David Greene	15 episodes
1998	The Magnificent Seven	Reverend Owen Mosley	Episode: "Manhunt"
1998	To Have and To Hold	Robert McGrail	Main role, 8 episodes
2000	Roswell	James Valenti, Sr.	2 episodes: "Into The Woods" and "The Convention"
2003–11	Law & Order: Special Victims Unit	Barry Moredock	11 episodes
2007	Mad Men	Lee Garner, Sr.	2 episodes: "Smoke Gets In Your Eyes" & "Indian Summer"
2009–18	The Middle	Big Mike	9 episodes
2011	Damages	Ed O'Malley	Episode: "Add That Litle Hopper to Your Stew"
2012	30 Rock	Leap Day William	Episode: "Leap Day"
2012	Royal Pains	Andres Bochinski	Episode: "Dawn of the Med"
2013	The Good Wife	Cardinal James	Episode: "Death of a Client"
2013	Live from Lincoln Center	Starkeeper/Dr. Seldon	Episode: "The New York Philharmonic's Performance of Rodgers and Hammerstein's Carousel"
2013	Nurse Jackie	Wally	Episode: "Soul"
2015	Unbreakable Kimmy Schmidt	Daddy's Daddy	Episode: "Kimmy's in a Love Triangle!"
2016	Thanksgiving	Walter Morgan	Main role; 6 episodes
2017	Madam Secretary	Senator Beau Carpenter	4 episodes
2019	The Blacklist	Ted King	Episode: "The Third Estate (No. 136)"
2021	Prodigal Son	Logan Zeiger	Episode: "Sun and Fun"

== Accolades ==
Awards

- 1966 Theatre World Award – On a Clear Day You Can See Forever
- 1975 Drama Desk Award Outstanding Actor, Musical – Shenandoah
- 1975 Outer Critics Circle Award, Best Performances – Shenandoah
- 1975 Tony Award Best Actor in a Musical – Shenandoah
- 1978 Tony Award Best Actor in a Musical – On the Twentieth Century
- 1982 Drama Desk Award for Unique Theatrical Experience for the one-man show Whistler
- 1998 Founders Day Medal, University of Tennessee
- 2004 Clarence Brown Theatre Company (University of Tennessee), Lifetime Achievement Award
- 2007 Inductee American Theatre Hall of Fame
- 2014 Long Island International Film Expo Award for Best Supporting Actor – The Historian

Nominations

- 1966 Tony Award Best Actor in a Musical – On a Clear Day You Can See Forever
- 1993 Emmy Award Best Supporting Actor in a Drama – Northern Exposure
- 2002 Outer Critics Circle Award Outstanding Actor in a Musical – Urinetown
- 2002 Tony Award Best Actor in a Musical – Urinetown
- 2005 Drama Desk Award for Outstanding Actor in a Play – Sin (A Cardinal Deposed)
- 2007 Tony Award Best Featured Actor in a Musical – 110 in the Shade
- 2008 Drama Desk Award, Outstanding Featured Actor in a Play – The Conscientious Objector
