= The Dinner Party (film) =

- Directed by: Miles Doleac
- Written by: Miles Doleac; Michael Donovan Horn
- Starring: Bill Sage; Miles Doleac; Alli Hart; Lindsay Anne Williams; Sawandi Wilson; Jeremy London; Ritchie Montgomery
- Release date: June 5, 2020
- Running time: 116 minutes
- Country: United States
- Language: English

The Dinner Party is a 2020 American horror thriller film written by Miles Doleac and Michael Donovan Horn, directed by Doleac, and starring Alli Hart, Bill Sage, Mike Mayhall, Ritchie Montgomery, Sawandi Wilson, Kamille McCuin, and Doleac.

== Plot ==
Aspiring playwright Jeff (Mike Mayhall) and his neurotic, medicated wife Haley (Alli Hart) arrive at a remote, luxurious estate for a semi-annual dinner party hosted by Carmine Braun (Bill Sage) and his companion Sebastian (Sawandi Wilson). Jeff is eager to charm these wealthy strangers into investing in his new Broadway play, ignoring the warning signs and eerie atmosphere. Upon arrival, Sebastian scares them with a devil mask before welcoming them in, immediately setting a tone of chaotic malice. They meet other enigmatic guests, including the Tarot card reader Sadie (Lindsay Anne Williams) and novelist Agatha (Kamille McCuin).

As the evening progresses, the atmosphere becomes increasingly tense as the hosts and guests engage in intellectual, opera-focused discussions that foreshadow the violence to come. Haley feels isolated as Sadie focuses on her, while the guests engage in menacing banter. The couple is gradually drugged, and the true purpose of the dinner is revealed: it is a gathering of a cult-like group that performs ritualistic, violent, and occultic tortures. The horror escalates as Haley is subjected to psychological and physical torture, aimed at breaking her down and bringing up traumatic memories, while the guests, led by Carmine and Sadie, revel in their "culinary" rituals. Jeff is murdered early on, and Haley is restrained, forced to sit at the table while the cultists feast. Sadie performs a ritual on Haley, but it backfires, triggering a fight-or-flight response in her.

In the final act, a drugged and terrified Haley transforms into a "final girl," breaking free from her bindings and attacking the cult members. She manages to kill several of them in a frenzied fight. Sebastian is the last to die, murdered by Haley while he reminisces about opera, bringing a dark twist to the proceedings.

The film concludes with Haley facing Sadie, who reveals a supernatural element to her character. Haley shoots Sadie twice, but the wounds appear to heal, suggesting Sadie is not entirely mortal. Sadie tells Haley she has chosen her own path, showing her tarot cards and indicating that death can mean a new beginning. The movie ends with a cryptic image of Adam and Eve, suggesting the nightmare for Haley is not truly over or has taken a new form.

== Cast ==
- Alli Hart as Haley Duncan
- Bill Sage as Carmine Braun
- Mike Mayall as Jeffery Duncan
- Ritchie Montgomery as Brooks
- Sawandi Wilson as Sebastian Todd
- Kamille McCuin as Agatha Archer
- Miles Doleac as Vincent
- Lindsay Anne Williams as Sadie Nichols
- Jeremy London as Haley’s Stepdad

== Release ==
The film was released on DVD and on demand on June 5, 2020.

== Reception ==
The film has a 43% rating on Rotten Tomatoes based on 14 reviews. Josiah Teal of Film Threat scored the film an 8.5 out of 10.
