= Don't Kill It =

2016 film directed by Mike Mendez

- Theatrical release poster (Note: Contrary to the film's theatrical poster, Don't Kill It was released in select theaters on March 3, 2017.)
- Directed by: Mike Mendez
- Written by: Dan Berk; Robert Olsen
- Produced by: Robert Yocum; Scott Martin; Michael Thomas Slifkin; Jeff Spilman
- Starring: Dolph Lundgren; Kristina Klebe; Tony Bentley; James Chalke; Miles Doleac; Otis Willard
- Cinematography: Jan-Michael Losada
- Edited by: Mike Mendez
- Music by: Sean Beavan; Juliette Beavan
- Production companies: Archstone Pictures; Burning Sky Films; Bottom Line Entertainment; Eyevox
- Distributed by: Archstone Distribution
- Release dates: August 27, 2016 (Fantasy Filmfest); March 3, 2017 (United States)
- Running time: 83 minutes
- Country: United States
- Language: English
- Budget: <$1 million
- Box office: $8,196

Don't Kill It is a 2016 American comedy horror film directed and edited by Mike Mendez. Written by Dan Berk and Robert Olsen, it stars Dolph Lundgren as Jebediah Woodley, a demon hunter who travels to Mississippi in the hopes of destroying an ancient, homicidal demon. Kristina Klebe, Tony Bentley, James Chalke, and Miles Doleac appear in supporting roles.

Mendez was attached to direct for over four years. Originally set in Alaska, once green-lit the script was altered and filming moved to Mississippi over financial concerns. The budget was less than $1 million, with $15,000 of it raised via the crowdfunding website Indiegogo. Lundgren was cast around 9–10 months before filming commenced, whilst Klebe only had one-to-two weeks notice.

After being postponed twice, principal photography commenced over the 2015 Christmas holiday season in Lexington, Mississippi. Filming concluded after 17 days of shooting, with the film having its premiere at the Fantasy Filmfest in Hamburg, Germany, on August 27, 2016. This was followed by the North American premiere on September 26, 2016, at Fantastic Fest in Austin, Texas. A limited theatrical release followed on March 3, 2017, via AMC Theatres. Opening to mostly positive reviews, Noel Murray of the Los Angeles Times, described Don't Kill It as one of Lundgren's "most entertaining movies in years."

== Plot ==
While chasing deer on a hunting trip in southern Mississippi, Gabriel's dog discovers and opens a small, unusual golden container. When Gabriel finds his dog, it acts strangely before violently attacking him. After shooting and killing the dog in self-defense, Gabriel returns home, displaying the same unusual behaviors and black eyes. In the wake of killing his family, Gabriel enters a neighboring house and begins to slaughter everyone in sight before being shot dead by his neighbor, Marcus, who immediately gets the same black eyes and completes Gabriel's task, by murdering his own family.

A few days later, demon hunter Jebediah Woodley hears of the murders on the radio and travels to the small town to investigate. At the same time, FBI agent Evelyn Pierce, who grew up in the area, has been assigned to investigate the case for possible links to domestic terrorism. Woodley travels to the local police station to express his concerns. However, Pierce - along with Dunham, the local police chief - quickly dismiss Woodley's claims of demon activity and order him to be detained under the assumption that he is mentally ill. Whilst Pierce leaves to interview a witness to the most recent series of murders, Woodley advises her to ask about the killer's eyes. Upon interviewing the witness, it is explained to Pierce that Gabriel entered the witness' home and killed her daughter before being shot by her husband, Marcus. Marcus then executed their son and attempted to murder her before she escaped. Pierce learns that the husband's eyes also turned black before he went into a murderous rampage, and thus realizes Woodley is in fact telling the truth.

Back at the station, Woodley is released by Pierce and Dunham. At a nearby café, Woodley explains to them that the demon possesses the body of whoever killed its last host. He goes on to say that the only way to defeat the demon is by killing the host whilst simultaneously ensuring one's own death; his own father captured the demon when he was a child and poisoned himself before killing the host. Woodley held onto the captured demon for decades before it escaped.

After stocking up on weapons and ammunition, Woodley and Pierce's investigation takes them to a nearby cabin in the woods. Woodley and Pierce mistakenly capture a drunkard living in the cabin, who says he shot the demon in the stomach and that it was his friend, Glen, that executed the demon's host and ran off into the woods immediately following the incident. Woodley and Pierce proceed to track the demon through the woods, which ends with Pierce being attacked by the demon. Instead of killing her, the demon shows an interest in Pierce and attempts to get her to kill it, giving her horrible visions of an apocalyptic future. Woodley tries to subdue the demon, but before he can do so, it manages to escape. Later, Pierce visits her old home with Woodley and tells him that she drowned to death in her garden pool as a child, but was mysteriously brought back to life. This resulted in her family being persecuted and run out of town by superstitious citizens.

Dunham organizes a town hall meeting, late at night, to warn citizens of the danger. During his speech, Dunham is interrupted by the demon, who slaughters the congregation and rapidly changes bodies before Woodley can get to it. It flees to a nearby house, where it manipulates a young girl into killing its host, thus taking over the girl. Dunham flees the town; at the same time Woodley enters a church, where the local pastor, Erikson, who remains suspicious of him, accuses Woodley and Pierce of being evil and the cause of mayhem. Woodley reacts by punching Erikson, and leaves to rejoin Pierce.

The father of the now-possessed girl, Emmett, encounters Woodley and Pierce in the middle of the anarchy, urging both to help him. Woodley and Pierce travel to Emmett's home, where it is revealed Emmett has locked his daughter in a backroom. Woodley convinces Emmett to poison himself and kill his daughter, ending the demon's trail as before. However, the FBI - who have been called there secretly by Pierce - storm the home before Emmett can carry out the killing, and Emmett dies uselessly; the head agent, Deacon Shepherd, has Woodley arrested for poisoning him. The possessed girl slaughters the FBI agents except for Shepherd, who mortally wounds the demon before it flees.

Fleeing farther into the woods, the demon's host eventually dies and it possesses Shepherd, given he mortally wounded the demon minutes prior. The demon once more goads Pierce into killing it. Woodley risks his own life to successfully capture the demon and prepares to poison himself in an effort to kill the demon, like his father before him. Before completing the ritual, Woodley and Pierce are interrupted by Erikson, who has tracked them down with an angry mob of congregation members under the assumption Woodley is evil and has captured an innocent man. Erikson attacks Woodley as the mob frees Shepherd, who immediately begins to murder everyone present. Erikson kills Shepherd and is possessed. As the demon tries to kill Woodley, Pierce grabs a vest covered in grenades from a dead FBI agent's corpse and pulls the pin out before killing Erikson. As the demon takes over Pierce, apocalyptic phenomena from Pierce's earlier visions begin to occur. Whilst possessed Pierce levitates off the ground, but the grenade in her hand detonates, killing both her and the demon.

Some time later, Woodley is seen on a boat in the middle of the ocean. Having captured the remains of the demon in a flask, Woodley drops the flask into the ocean. The flask is quickly consumed by a great white shark, implying the events will repeat in the near future.

== Cast ==
- Dolph Lundgren as Jebediah Woodley
  - Ryan Zweers as Young Jebediah Woodley
- Kristina Klebe as FBI Agent Evelyn Pierce
- Tony Bentley as Chief Dunham
- James Chalke as Pastor Erikson
- Miles Doleac as Deacon Shepard
- Otis Willard as Toby Bronson
- Michelle West as Amber
- Todd Farmer as Marcus
- Dawn Ferry as Wendy
- Thomas Owen as Jeremy
- Billy Slaughter as FBI Agent Jackson
- Aaron McPherson as Emmett
- Joh Bohn as FBI Agent Lug
- Jasi Lanier as Rose
- Michael Aaron Milligan as Frank
- Laura Warner as Eunice
- Randy Austin as Gabriel
- Milorad Djomlija as Glen Prichard
- Sam Furman as Danny
- Tony Messenger as Jebediah Woodley Sr.

== Production ==
=== Development ===
Mike Mendez was attached to direct the film for over four years, (Note: Mendez contradicted himself in an interview, so the exact length of attachment is not known.) largely due to happenstance. Producer Robert Yocum introduced the script to Mendez, having seen his previous work and believing Mendez's "frenetic energy" to be well suited for the project. The script was set in Alaska and had a "30 Days of Night [and] Fargo feel" to it. However, when Don't Kill It was green-lit, it was a case of: "great, we're shooting in Mississippi." Due to the small budget, Mendez knew they weren't "going to cover the town in snow and pretend it's Alaska", so he had to adapt "very quickly" to the situation at hand. In order for them to create the "final elements", producer Scott Martin raised over $15,000 for the film via Indiegogo; his initial aim was to raise $100,000 through crowdfunding.

=== Casting ===
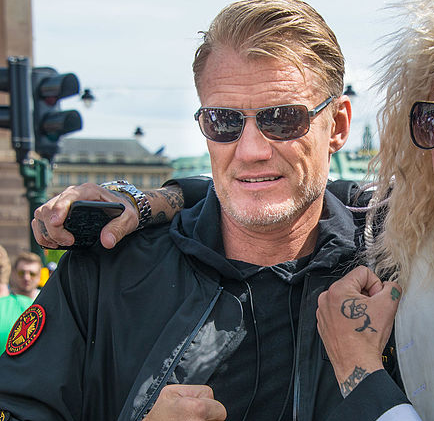
Dolph Lundgren in 2015, around the time he was cast as Jebediah Woodley

Dolph Lundgren was cast in the lead role of Jebediah Woodley, his debut in the horror movie genre. He found out about the role 9–10 months before shooting began on the film. He rehearsed different pages of dialogue and monologues in a short space of time while production was postponed on two occasions, which caused the character to grow on him. On his character, Lundgren said: "Jebediah Woodley is one of those guys that when I'm sitting in my rocking chair one day, thinking back, I'll remember that guy. He was a fun guy to play."

Kristina Klebe portrays FBI Agent Evelyn Pierce. Just before Thanksgiving and about two weeks before shooting began, Mendez gave her a call and said he would send her the script. Despite working with Mendez on Tales of Halloween (in 2015) and The Last Heist (the following year), Klebe still had to "put herself on tape" because they were auditioning a few people. She did not hear anything back until four days before filming. The delay was because of a failure to agree, not the point at which she was cast. On Klebe's performance, Lundgren said: she "plays her character pretty straight", which worked "quite well" in retrospect due to Woodley's "crazy and colorful" nature. He went on to say: "Kristina really loved the part, so she was very accommodating and willing to explore it and work hard."

Ryan Zweers and Tony Messenger portray Jebediah Woodley (aged 12) and Jebediah Woodley Sr., respectively. A casting call from Morgan Casting went out via Backstage magazine in December 2015, advertising pay for both roles as being $100 per day.

=== Filming ===
"[We] had 12 days to prep. During the prep time, I think I got five or six hours of sleep a night if I was lucky as we were in the holiday season and had to finish filming by Christmas."

— Mendez on the filming of Don't Kill It

Principal photography lasted 17 days in Lexington, Mississippi, over the 2015 Christmas holiday season. Mendez said they had 12 days to prepare beforehand, during which time he was "lucky" to get five or six hours sleep each night. The town initially sought for filming refused to grant permission, so the production crew had to move "20 miles out." (Note: News outlets had incorrectly reported of filming in Canton, Mississippi.) Mendez claims the "town [used for filming] had never had a movie shot" there before, and went on to say: "it's actually one of the poorest suburbs in America, to be honest." The city and public were very interested in the production and the presence of Dolph Lundgren within their community. Furthermore, the local authorities were helpful and provided the production crew with access to different locations, including the local church, as well as "police cars [to shut down] streets for filming."

== Release ==
=== Theatrical ===
Archstone Distribution acquired the worldwide distribution rights on May 27, 2015, at which time it was announced they would launch sales at the 2015 Cannes Film Festival. Don't Kill It received its worldwide premiere on August 27, 2016, at the Fantasy Filmfest in Hamburg, Germany. This was followed by its North American premiere on September 26, 2016, at Fantastic Fest in Austin, Texas. On March 3, 2017, the film had a select theatrical release and was made available through video on demand.

=== Home media ===
Don't Kill It received a blu-ray and DVD home video release in the United States on April 4, 2017, distributed by Sony Pictures Home Entertainment.

== Reception ==
=== Box office ===
AMC Theatres hosted Don't Kill It for an unspecified amount of time, beginning March 3, 2017. Domestic box office takings are not known, however the film did gross $8,196 during a cinematic release in the United Arab Emirates on January 25, 2018.

=== Critical response ===
==== Initial reactions ====
"Judging from the crowd's reaction at its recent Fantastic Fest screening, I am convinced that Don't Kill It might ultimately fare best with the general public."

— Ari Drew of Dread Central.

Don't Kill It reportedly premiered to "rave" reviews at many major film festivals around the world.

Richard Whittaker of The Austin Chronicle, attended the US premiere in Austin, Texas. In a positive review, he described "this horror-comedy [as a] gutbuster [of] belly laughs." Unlike Lundgren's other movies, Don't Kill It "revels in his dry yet goofy sense of humor, rather than the taciturn killer he was born to play." Lundgren was the component Mendez "really needed"; "perfectly" self-aware; his "perfect muse/foil for his brand of smartly/silly horror spoof". Bloody Disgusting's Trace Thurman came to the same conclusion as Whittaker, stating: there is "plenty of tongue in cheek" in which "Dolph Lundgren [is given] a chance to shine." According to him, Don't Kill It "plays like a B-movie version of Fallen, but without the class of that latter film; that's a compliment. Who knew that Lundgren was such a comedian? There were some moments in the film that had to have been improvised, and they're such treats to watch." Unfortunately, the film "peaks early" with the church shootout. The scene is "so fantastically entertaining that nothing that comes after it is able to measure up to it." Contrarily, Thurman took aim at Klebe, stating: "[she] is serviceable as Pierce but she is stuck playing the Felix Ungar to Lundgren's Oscar Madison. Woodley needs a foil but Pierce spends the first half of the film being a stick in the mud. One wishes that she was given more to do."

On the other hand, Ari Drew of Dread Central said: "On the surface, Don't Kill It has all of the makings of a standard Syfy original action-horror offering; the dialogue is often ridiculous, the action sequences outrageous, and the characterization is relatively thin. However, the plus side here is that Mendez’s film most definitely knows what it is and how to have a blast with it. This is particularly evidenced in its opening scene, which is a rollicking exercise in over-the-top hyperviolence."

==== General consensus ====
The film received mainly positive reviews. Rotten Tomatoes reports an approval rating of 93% based on 15 surveyed critics, with an average rating of 7.0 out of 10.

Noel Murray of the Los Angeles Times, called the film one of Lundgren's "most entertaining movies in years." He praised screenwriters Dan Berk and Robert Olsen for their "clever story about a supernatural force that turns its human hosts mindlessly homicidal". On the contrary, he criticized Mike Mendez for his editing, claiming "his many, many set-up scenes are to clunky", but on a positive note gave him praise for the fast pace and "lightness" of the film.

Hayleigh Foutch of Collider, said the film "is a cheeky camp parade with buckets of low-rent charm, and for fans of camp cinema and Lundgren's B-Movie fare, Don't Kill It will fit like slipping into something cozy and familiar with a few surprises along the way." Agreeing with Donato, she said: Lundgren "rarely gets to have so much fun" in his movies. And like others, she spoke of the "lull [in the] second act", during which time the movie falls into "exposition and back story". Michael Nordine of The Village Voice, gave a somewhat negative review, stating: "[Lundgren] seems to hover just above the material, aware of its silliness but willing the indulge it all the same. Those who favor gore above all else will be at home amid the blood and guts, but anyone hoping for more than a VOD time-killer that's occasionally in on the joke of its own ridiculousness is barking up the wrong tree."

== Potential sequel ==
Lundgren said he would be open to returning for a sequel, but would prefer any potential sequel will have better planning and "more resources" at hand. On a similar note, Mendez said: "People are reacting to the film so much, and what we constantly hear is, 'Will there be another one?' What more could you ask for? We're finding [Jebediah] at a moment in time. There have been adventures before and there will be adventures afterwards, so I'm hoping we'll find a financial partner that wants to explore that and take that ride, because we'd love to explore that, too."
