= Alien Opponent =

- Written by: John Doolan
- Directed by: Colin Theys
- Starring: Roddy Piper
- Music by: Matthew Llewellyn; Stephen Webster
- Original language: English

Production
- Producer: Andrew Gernhard
- Cinematography: Matthew Wauhkonen

Original release
- Release: 2010

Alien Opponent is a 2010 American television science fiction film written by John Doolan, directed by Colin Theys, and starring Roddy Piper. It was first broadcast on Chiller and later released on DVD by Shout! Factory.

== Plot ==
The abusive, drunk owner of a small-town junkyard is killed by his mother in law just before an alien crash-lands in the middle of it. In order to collect their insurance money, the family has to recover his body, so they offer a cash prize for recovery of the body and put out local ads. Soon, the junkyard is a warzone, as every local wingnut turns up with a weapon to fight the alien invader.

== Cast ==
- Roddy Piper as Father Melluzzo
- Jeremy London as Brooklyn Davis
- Cuyle Carvin as Bradan James
- Angela Relucio as Mary Lane
- Sari Gagnon as Deborah Dallas
- Greg Nutcher as Officer Remillard
- Adrienne LaValley as Linnea Gold
- Jessica Alexandra Green as Paris Montag
- Dave Lounder as Eagle Scout
- Hilma Falkowski as Rita
- Thomas Daniel as Bobby Ray
- Paul Braccioforte as Jack
- Ashley Bates as Meghan Mazurski
- Christopher John Dionne as Rusty
