= Clifton Hyde =

American musician

- Hyde performing in Brooklyn on November 17, 2006

Background information
- Born: November 27, 1976; Hattiesburg, Mississippi, United States
- Genres: Blues, jazz, rock
- Occupations: Multi-instrumentalist, composer, producer
- Instruments: Guitar, modular synthesizer, steel guitar, baritone guitar, mandocello, Chapman Stick, zither, piano, mandolin, French horn, alto horn
- Website: cliftonhyde.com

Clifton Hyde (born November 27, 1976) is an American multi-instrumentalist, composer, and producer currently working from and residing in Nashville. He has composed multiple film scores and is a frequent collaborator of filmmaker Miles Doleac. Hyde has composed scores for The Hollow, Demons, Two Birds, Handsome, Hallowed Ground, and Demigod. In his feature film debut, Sona Jain's For Real; Clifton performed as pianist for composer/tabla player, Zakir Hussain. His piano and steel guitar can be heard on the feature film, Sun Dogs.

He has performed with Michael Stipe (R.E.M), Patti Smith, Philip Glass, Debbie Harry (Blondie), Lou Reed, Ben Harper, and The Kinks Dave Davies at Carnegie Hall. He also performed at Carnegie Hall on French Horn with the South Korean Symphony performing Mozart's "Mass In C Major" and Haydn's "Great Mass" and Baritone acoustic guitar with Iceland's Sigur Ros.

Hyde collaborated with the sculptures of French artist Alain Kirili and the paintings of artist Lou Rizzolo for the World Peace Art Initiative in Stavanger, Norway. He has composed modern classical music for modern dance choreographer Janis Brenner as well as providing music for the Czech-American Marionette Theatre. He has performed in the pit for numerous Broadway/off Broadway shows such as "The Rocky Horror Show", Jesus Christ Superstar, Guys and Dolls, Hair, City of Angels, Return to the Forbidden Planet, Blood Brothers, The Who's Tommy, The Three Penny Opera, Little Shop of Horrors, Children of Eden, and many regional and touring companies.

He has worked with The Blue Man Group (Zither/Chapman Stick/Lead Guitar/Bass), Tinpan (guitar, voice, French horn, music director, producer), & Gato Loco (guitar, baritone guitar, French horn, alto horn, producer) as well as producing and playing with numerous other projects and musicians, including members of the Metropolitan Opera and New York Philharmonic.
