= William Sadler (actor) =

American actor (born 1950)

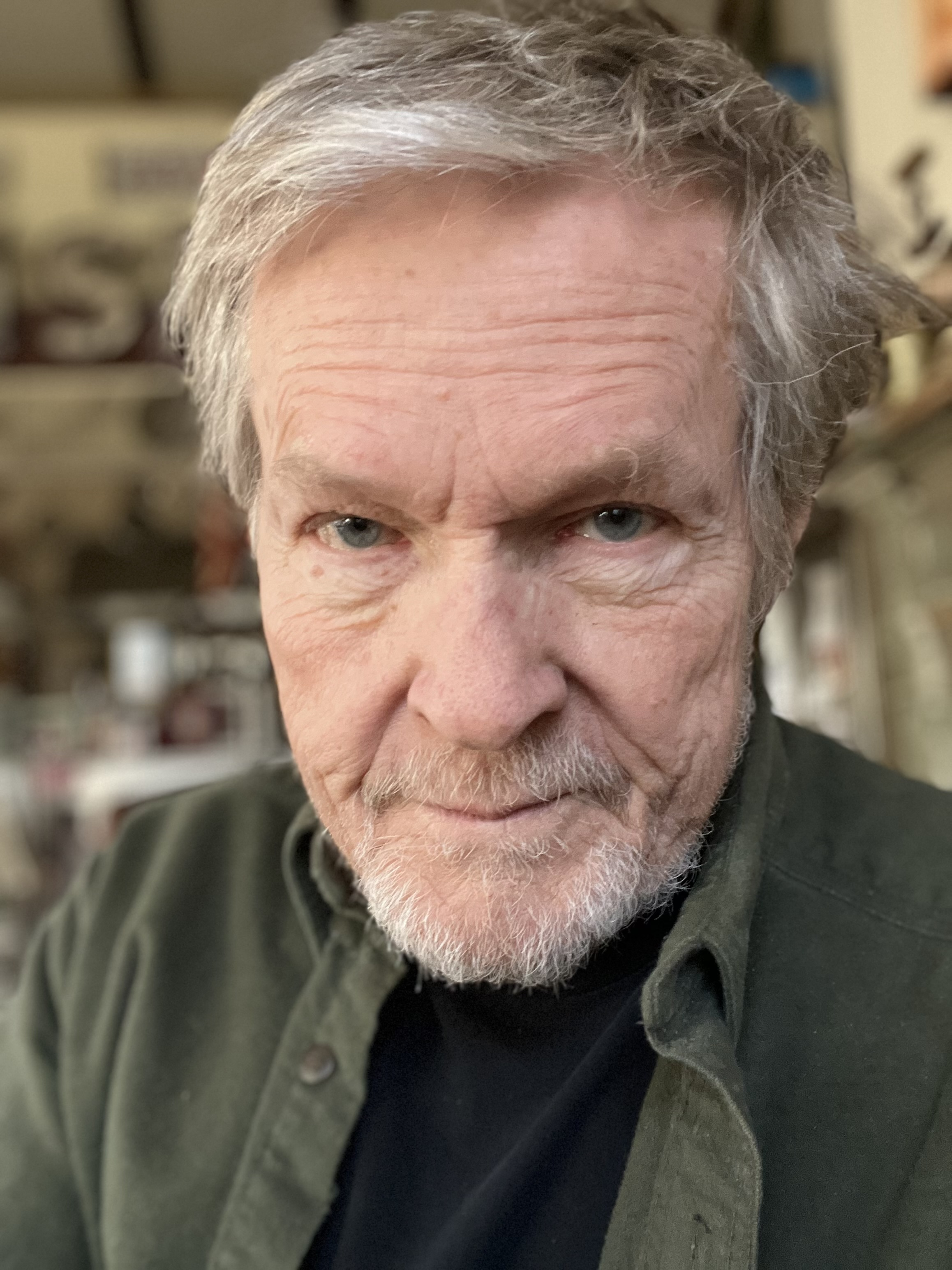
- Sadler in 2026
- Born: William Thomas Sadler; April 13, 1950 (age 76); Buffalo, New York, U.S.
- Education: State University of New York, Geneseo (BA); Cornell University (MFA)
- Occupation: Actor
- Years active: 1977–present
- Spouse: Marni Joan Bakst (m. 1978; died 2024)
- Children: 1

William Thomas Sadler (born April 13, 1950) is an American actor. He began his career in various Broadway productions including Neil Simon's Biloxi Blues (1985). Known as a character actor, his best known film roles include Die Hard 2 (1990), Bill & Ted's Bogus Journey (1991), The Shawshank Redemption (1994), The Green Mile (1999), The Mist (2007), and Bill & Ted Face the Music (2020). He portrayed President Matthew Ellis in various Marvel Cinematic Universe media including Iron Man 3 (2013) and Agents of S.H.I.E.L.D. (2015–2016), and he also portrayed Gino Fish in the Jesse Stone television films.

He has had roles in various television shows including Star Trek: Deep Space Nine (1998–1999), Roswell (1999–2002), The Pacific (2010) and Hawaii Five-0 (2010–2020).

== Early life ==
Sadler was born in Buffalo, New York, the son of Jane and William Sadler.

From an early age, he enjoyed performing for an audience. Playing a variety of stringed instruments, he found hometown success during his high-school years at Orchard Park High School. He took on the persona of Banjo Bill Sadler, a banjo-playing singer who cracked jokes while playing.

After graduating from high school, he enrolled at SUNY Geneseo; then spent two years at Cornell University, where he earned his master's degree in acting with a minor in speech communications.

== Career ==
A chance meeting with an old schoolmate on a trip into the city resulted in Sadler's casting in an off-off-Broadway production of Chekhov's Ivanov. After a brief turn at the Trinity Square Repertory Company in Providence, Rhode Island, Sadler moved back to New York and rented an apartment in the East Village, beginning twelve years in which he appeared in over 75 productions, including originating the role of Sgt. Toomey in the Broadway run of Neil Simon's Biloxi Blues, opposite Matthew Broderick in 1985.

Sadler is best known for his roles in the 1990 action film Die Hard 2 as Colonel Stuart, as Heywood in the 1994 prison drama The Shawshank Redemption, Death in the 1991 comedy Bill & Ted's Bogus Journey, and as Brayker in Demon Knight. When he first auditioned for a role in Tales From the Crypt, he was told he was too young. With a make-up artist friend's help, Sadler re-auditioned as a 70-year-old, and won the part. In addition to appearing in Bill & Ted's Bogus Journey as Death, Sadler also appears as himself, with his real-life wife and 5-year-old daughter, in scenes where families around the world respond to Bill and Ted's actions. He reprised his Death role in the 2020 sequel Bill & Ted Face the Music.

Sadler was also a regular on the television series Roswell as Sheriff Jim Valenti, and in Wonderfalls as Darrin Tyler.

His other film credits include Trespass, K-9, Project X, Disturbing Behavior, Kinsey, The Battle of Shaker Heights, Purple Heart, Jimmy and Judy and August Rush.

Sadler's TV guest appearances include In the Heat of the Night, Roseanne, Tru Calling, Tour of Duty, CSI, Numb3rs, and Law & Order: Criminal Intent. He had a recurring role on Star Trek: Deep Space Nine as Luther Sloan.

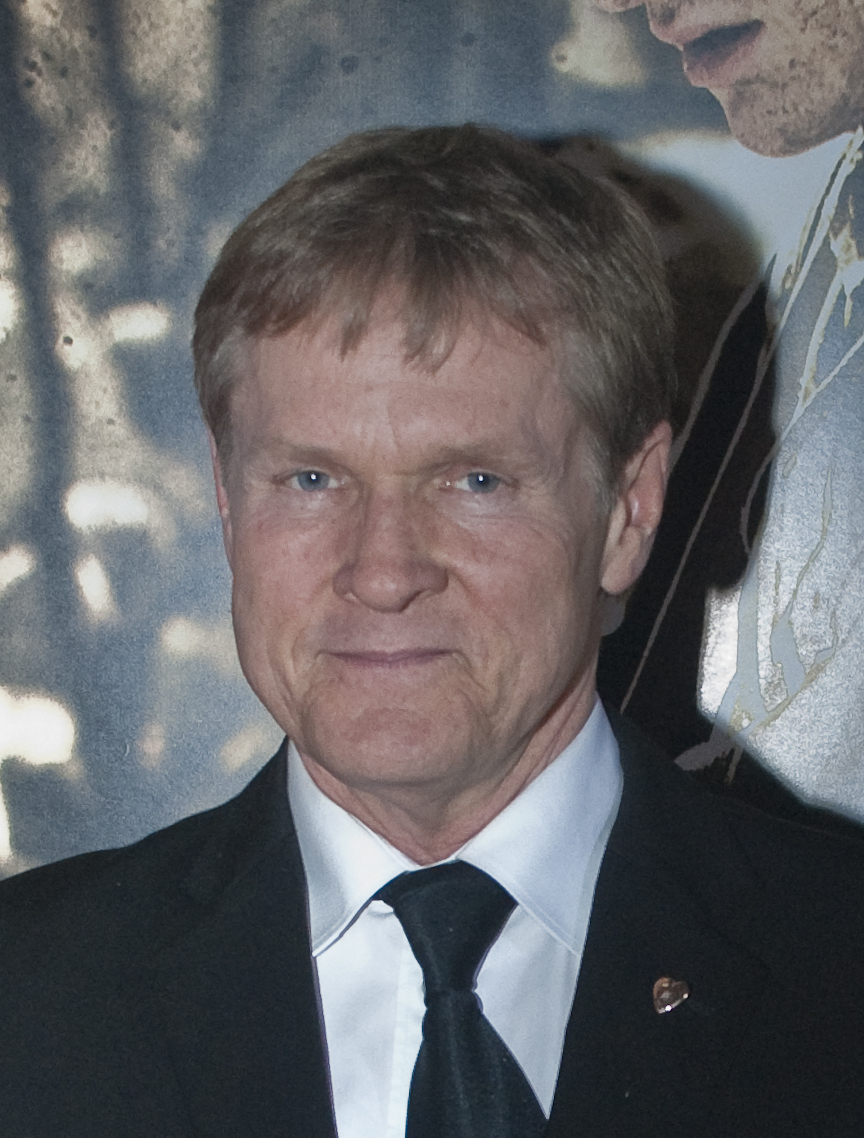
Sadler in 2010

He appeared in three episodes as Sloan in Star Trek: Deep Space Nine's final two seasons. In 2007, he played Carlton Fog on ABC's Traveler, and in 2008 he appeared in both NBC's Medium as well as Fox Television's Fringe. The 1989 pilot episode of the HBO horror anthology series Tales from the Crypt featured Sadler in its lead role. In March 2011, Sadler made a guest appearance in NBC's Chase.

Sadler portrayed Julius Caesar in the contemporary adaptation of William Shakespeare's Julius Caesar on Broadway alongside Denzel Washington at the Belasco Theatre. Recently, he finished shooting with American independent filmmakers Dylan Bank and Morgan Pehme on the film Nothing Sacred. Sadler portrayed the robot Victor in the 2010 video game, Fallout: New Vegas. Sadler played Lee Underwood in Greetings from Tim Buckley, a film on Tim and Jeff Buckley, which premiered at the 2012 Toronto International Film Festival.

Sadler appeared as Matthew Ellis, the President of the United States, in Iron Man 3 (2013).

In 2015, Sadler was part of the Texas Frightmare Weekend, and starred in Ava's Possessions, which was screened at SXSW.

On September 8, 2021, it was announced that Sadler was cast as Parkins Gillespie in 'Salem's Lot, an adaptation of Stephen King's novel of the same name.

== Personal life ==
Sadler married his wife, Marni Joan Bakst, on May 6, 1978. They had a daughter together, Sadler Colley Bakst, age 38 at the time of her mother's death. On December 19, 2024, Sadler confirmed his wife had died after a "two year battle with cancer".

== Filmography ==
=== Film ===
Year	Title	Role	Notes
1982	Hanky Panky	Hotel Clerk	
1986	Off Beat	Dickson	
1987	Project X	Dr. Carroll	
1989	K-9	Don, Car Salesman	
1990	Hard to Kill	Senator Vernon Trent	
1990	Die Hard 2	United States Army Colonel William Stuart	
1990	The Hot Spot	Frank Sutton	
1991	Bill & Ted's Bogus Journey	Death / English Family Member	Saturn Award for Best Supporting Actor
1991	Rush	Monroe	
1992	Trespass	Don Perry	
1993	Freaked	Dick Brian	
1994	The Shawshank Redemption	Heywood	
1995	Demon Knight	Frank Brayker	
1996	Bordello of Blood	The Mummy	
1996	Solo	Colonel Frank Madden / Improved Solo	
1997	RocketMan	Bill 'Wild Bill' Overbeck	
1998	Ambushed	Jim Natter	
1998	Disturbing Behavior	Dorian Newberry	
1998	Reach the Rock	Quinn	
1999	Stealth Fighter	Admiral Frank Peterson	
1999	The Green Mile	Klaus Detterick	
2001	Skippy	Ringo	
2002	Another Life	Man	Short film
2003	The Battle of Shaker Heights	Abraham 'Abe' Ernswiler	
2004	Kinsey	Kenneth Braun	
2005	Devour	Ivan Reisz	
2005	Confess	Senator Roger Lampert	
2005	Purple Heart	Colonel Allen	
2006	The Good Student	Phil 'Honest Phil' Palmer	
2006	Jimmy and Judy	Uncle Rodney	
2006	Premium	Cole Carter	
2006	Unspoken	Dad	
2006	The Wine Bar	Bartender	Short film
2007	A New Wave	Mr. Dewitt	
2007	August Rush	Thomas Novacek	
2007	The Mist	Jim Grondin	
2008	Eagle Eye	William Shaw	
2009	Stream	Dr. Shelby	Short film
2009	Shadowheart	Thomas Conners	Direct-to-video
2009	The Hills Run Red	Wilson Wyler Concannon	
2009	Last Day of Summer	Mr. Crolick	
2009	Beyond All Boundaries	Lieutenant Colonel Lewis 'Chesty' Puller (voice)	Short film
2009	Red & Blue Marbles	John	
2010	Melvin Smarty	Bob	
2010	Mineville	Tom O'Roarke	
2011	Silent but Deadly	John Capper	
2011	Open Gate	Robert	
2012	Man on a Ledge	Frank Cassidy / Valet	
2012	See Girl Run	Marty	
2012	Greetings from Tim Buckley	Lee Underwood	
2013	Iron Man 3	President Matthew Ellis	
2013	Machete Kills	Sheriff Doakes	
2013	The Suspect	Sheriff Dixon	
2013	Frank the Bastard	Cyrus Gast	
2014	Freedom	Plimpton	
2014	The Historian	Dr. Valerian Hadley	
2015	Ant-Man	President Matthew Ellis	Deleted scene
2016	The Duel	Lawrence Sullivan Ross, Governor of Texas	
2016	The Hollow	Sheriff Beau McKinney	
2018	Deadly Crush	Sheriff Dusty Hawkins	
2018	Living Among Us	Samuel	
2018	The Statement	Counselor	Short film
2019	The Highwaymen	Henry Barrow	
2019	VFW	Walter Reed	
2020	The Grudge	Detective Wilson	
2020	Bill & Ted Face the Music	Death	Also executive producer
2021	The Unholy	Father William Hagan	
2022	She Came from the Woods	Gilbert McAlister	
2022	A Stage of Twilight	Barry	
2024	'Salem's Lot	Parkins Gillespie	

=== Television ===
Year	Title	Role	Notes
1977	The CBS Festival of Lively Arts for Young People	Unknown	Episode: "Henry Winkler Meets William Shakespeare"
1978	The Great Wallendas	Dieter Schmidt	Television film
1981	Charlie and the Great Balloon Chase	Joey	Television film
1981	Nurse	Dr. George Bradford	Episode: "Margin for Error"
1982	The Neighborhood	Neighbor	Television film
1983	Newhart	Guest	Episode: "Lady & the Tramps"
1983	AfterMASH	Joe Warner	Episode: "Fallout"
1985	Assaulted Nuts	The Grim Reaper, Various Characters	Unknown episodes
1986	The Equalizer	Rick Dillon / Kevin Moore	Episode: "Shades of Darkness"
1987	Tour of Duty	Major Rigby	Episode: "Dislocations"
1987–1988	Private Eye	Lieutenant Charlie Fontana	12 episodes
1988	In the Heat of the Night	Ritchie Epman	Episodes: "Blind Spot: Part 1" & "Blind Spot: Part 2"
1988	St. Elsewhere	Mr. Oppenheimer	Episode: "The Abby Singer Show"
1988	Cadets	Colonel Tom Sturdivant	Television film
1988	Dear John	Ben	Episode: "The Younger Girl"
1989	Roseanne	Dwight	2 episodes
1989	Hooperman	Lanny Hardin	Episode: "Look Homeward, Dirtbag"
1989	Unconquered	Coach Dickey	Television film
1989	Murphy Brown	Colonel Fitzpatrick	Episode: "Off the Job Experience"
1989	Hard Time on Planet Earth	Officer Rollman	Episode: "The Way Home"
1989	Gideon Oliver	Franklin Finney	Episode: "By the Waters of Babylon"
1989, 1994	Tales from the Crypt	Niles Talbot The Grim Reaper	Episodes: "The Man Who Was Death" "The Assassin"
1990	The Face of Fear	Anthony Prine	Television film
1991	The Last to Go	Treat	Television film
1991	Tagget	Yuri Chelenkoff	Television film
1992	Two-Fisted Tales	Mr. Rush (Presenter)	Television film
1993	Night Driving	Eddy	Television short film
1993	Jack Reed: Badge of Honor	Anatole	Television film
1994	Bermuda Grace	Sam Grace	Television film
1994	Roadracers	Sarge	Television film
1995	The Omen	Dr. Linus	Television film
1995	The Outer Limits	Frank Hellner	Episode: "Valerie 23"
1996	Poltergeist: The Legacy	Shamus Bloom	Episode: The Fifth Sepulcher
1998–1999	Star Trek: Deep Space Nine	Luther Sloan	Episodes: "Inquisition", "Inter Arma Enim Silent Leges", "Extreme Measures"
1999	Witness Protection	US Attorney Sharp	Television film
1999–2002	Roswell	Sheriff Jim Valenti	61 episodes
2003	Ed	Lee Leetch	Episode: "The Case"
2003	Law & Order: Criminal Intent	Kyle Devlin	Episode: "Graansha"
2003	Project Greenlight	Himself	Unknown episodes
2004	Wonderfalls	Darrin Tyler	13 episodes
2004	JAG	Saul Wainwright	Episode: "Retrial"
2005	Third Watch	Scotty Murray	Episode: "Forever Blue"
2005	Tru Calling	Travis	Episode: "Enough"
2005	Law & Order: Trial by Jury	Paul Rice	Episode: "Blue Wall"
2005	Law & Order	Kevin Drucker	Episode: "Life Line"
2006	CSI: Crime Scene Investigation	Karl 'Red' Cooper	Episode: "Killer"
2006	The Path to 9/11	Neil Herman	Miniseries
2007	Numb3rs	J. Everett Tuttle	Episode: "Democracy"
2007	The Black Donnellys	Munst	Episode: "All of Us Are in the Gutter"
2007	Jesse Stone: Sea Change	Gino Fish	Television film
2007	Traveler	Carlton Fog	7 episodes
2008	Medium	John Edgemont	Episode: "Girls Ain't Nothing But Trouble"
2008–2011	Fringe	Dr. Sumner	Episodes: "The Equation" & "Alone in the World"
2009	Jesse Stone: Thin Ice	Gino Fish	Television film
2009	Jesse Stone: No Remorse	Gino Fish	Television film
2009	Criminal Minds	Ray Finnegan	Episode: "Reckoner"
2010	The Pacific	Lieutenant Colonel Lewis 'Chesty' Puller	Miniseries
2010–2020	Hawaii Five-0	John McGarrett	Various episodes: seasons 1–5, 10
2011	White Collar	Brett Gelles	Episode "Where There's a Will"
2011	Person of Interest	Seamus O'Mara	Episode: "Pilot"
2011	Jesse Stone: Innocents Lost	Gino Fish	Television film
2012	Damages	Helmut Torben	6 episodes
2012	Jesse Stone: Benefit of the Doubt	Gino Fish	Television film
2013	666 Park Avenue	Nate McKenny	2 episodes
2013	Elementary	Ian Gale	Episode: "Blood Is Thicker"
2013	Homeland	Michael Higgins	3 episodes
2013–2019	The Blacklist	Sam Milhoan	4 episodes
2014	The Flash	Simon Stagg	Episode: "Fastest Man Alive"
2014–2015	Madam Secretary	George Peters	2 episodes
2015	Edge	Bill 'Big Bill'	Television film
2015	Jesse Stone: Lost in Paradise	Gino Fish	Television film
2015	Z Nation	Sam Custer	Episode: "Zombie Road"
2015–2019	Blue Bloods	Armin Janko	Episodes: "Absolute Power" & "Identity"
2015–2016	Agents of S.H.I.E.L.D.	President Matthew Ellis	3 episodes
2016	Berlin Station	Clay Williams	4 episodes
2016	Shoot Me Nicely	Roy Barnes	Television film
2017	When We Rise	Chuck Cooper	
2017–2018	Power	Tony Teresi	
2018	Bull	Father Andy	Episode: "A Higher Law"
2018–2020	Our Cartoon President	John F. Kelly, Jeff Sessions, Mitch McConnell, Various Voices	
2019–2020	God Friended Me	Reverend Elias	
2019	When They See Us	Michael Sheehan	Miniseries
2019	Law & Order: Special Victims Unit	Gary Dolan	Episode: "Facing Demons"
2020	Hunters	Dr. Friedrich Mann	Episode: “Eilu v’ Eilu”
2020	The Comey Rule	Michael Flynn	Miniseries
2023	Full Circle	Gene McCusker	Miniseries
2025	The Rookie	Walter Fields	Episode: "The Watcher"
2026	Law & Order: Special Victims Unit	Father Anthony Lazarro	Episode: "Obedience"

=== Web ===
Year	Title	Role	Notes
2016	WHIH Newsfront	President Matthew Ellis	2 episodes
2017	Day 5	Bob / Sandman	4 episodes

=== Video games ===
Year	Title	Voice role	Notes
2008	Robert Ludlum's The Bourne Conspiracy	Alexander Conklin	Credited as Bill Sadler
2010	Fallout: New Vegas	Victor	
