= Christian Seidel =

German author and film producer

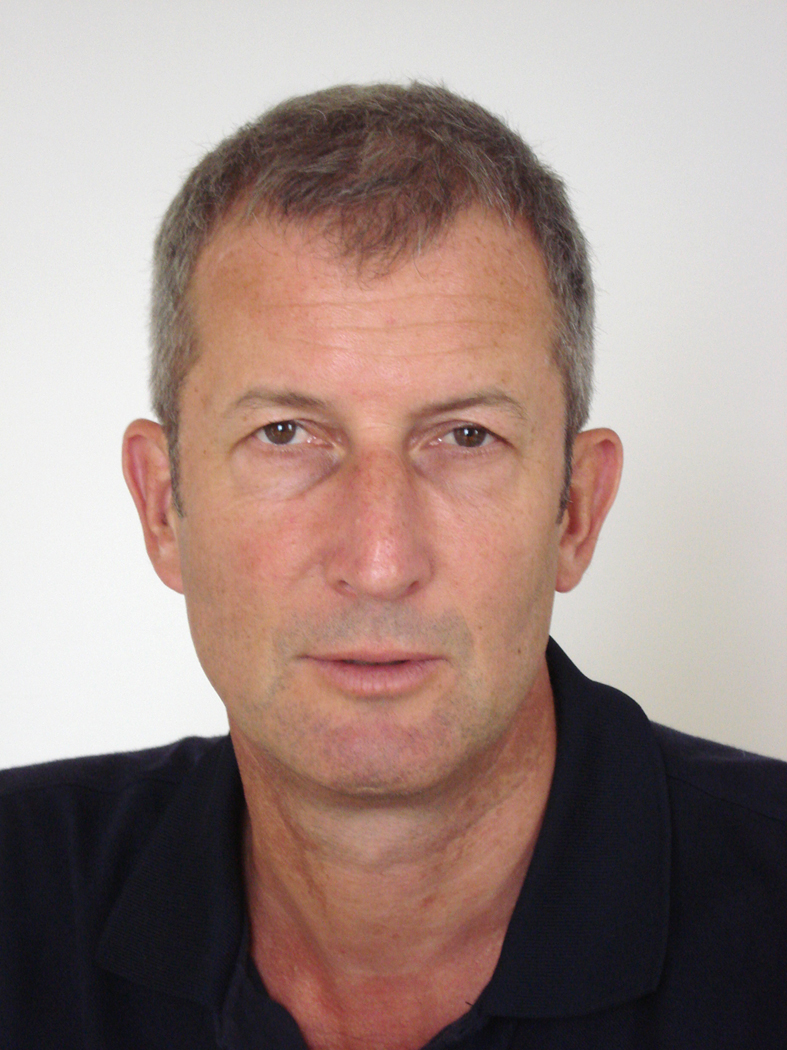
- Christian Seidel
- Born: 1959 (age 66–67)
- Occupations: writer, journalist, film producer and media manager

Christian Seidel (born 1959) is a German writer, journalist, film producer and media manager.

== Life and career ==
Seidel graduated from the Neue Münchner Schauspielschule.

He volunteered at SonntagsBlick and worked as a freelance writer and journalist for various newspapers and magazines, such as Quick, Neue Revue, Süddeutsche Zeitung, Abendzeitung, Tempo, Wiener and Stern.

During the founding of German private television stations in the 1980s, he was involved in the development of German private television. In 1988 he hired Claudia Schiffer for a television show, later he managed her for years. In 1992, he organized and coordinated the Model '92 competition for the RTL late-night show Gottschalk Late Night and "is considered one of the discoverers of Heidi Klum".

In the early 1990s he worked for the Kirch Group (Taurus Film), where he was responsible for the international marketing of the films and TV stations of the media group. In 1994 he founded his own company and took over a consultancy contract from Leo Kirch for his television station. Within this role, he was also asked to manage the presenter Arabella Kiesbauer, whose daily and weekly talk shows he accompanied in this role until 2004. He later produced the political format Talk ohne Show for N24 with Arabella Kiesbauer and then Bärbel Schäfer as moderator.

In 1997, Seidel secured the movie rights to Andrew Morton's bestseller "Diana: Her True Story". In 2002 he produced the feature film The Biographer – The Secret Life of Princess Di as an independent producer with director Philip Saville.

In 2003, he was in a serious car accident.

His book Gewinnen ohne zu kämpfen was published in 2011 by Ludwig Verlag, and in it, he explores his career in the international media industry. In doing so, he draws parallels to the philosophy of the martial art of Taekwondo, which he acquired for the book project from the Korean master Ko Eui-Min (1941–2023), who has been living in Germany since 1978.

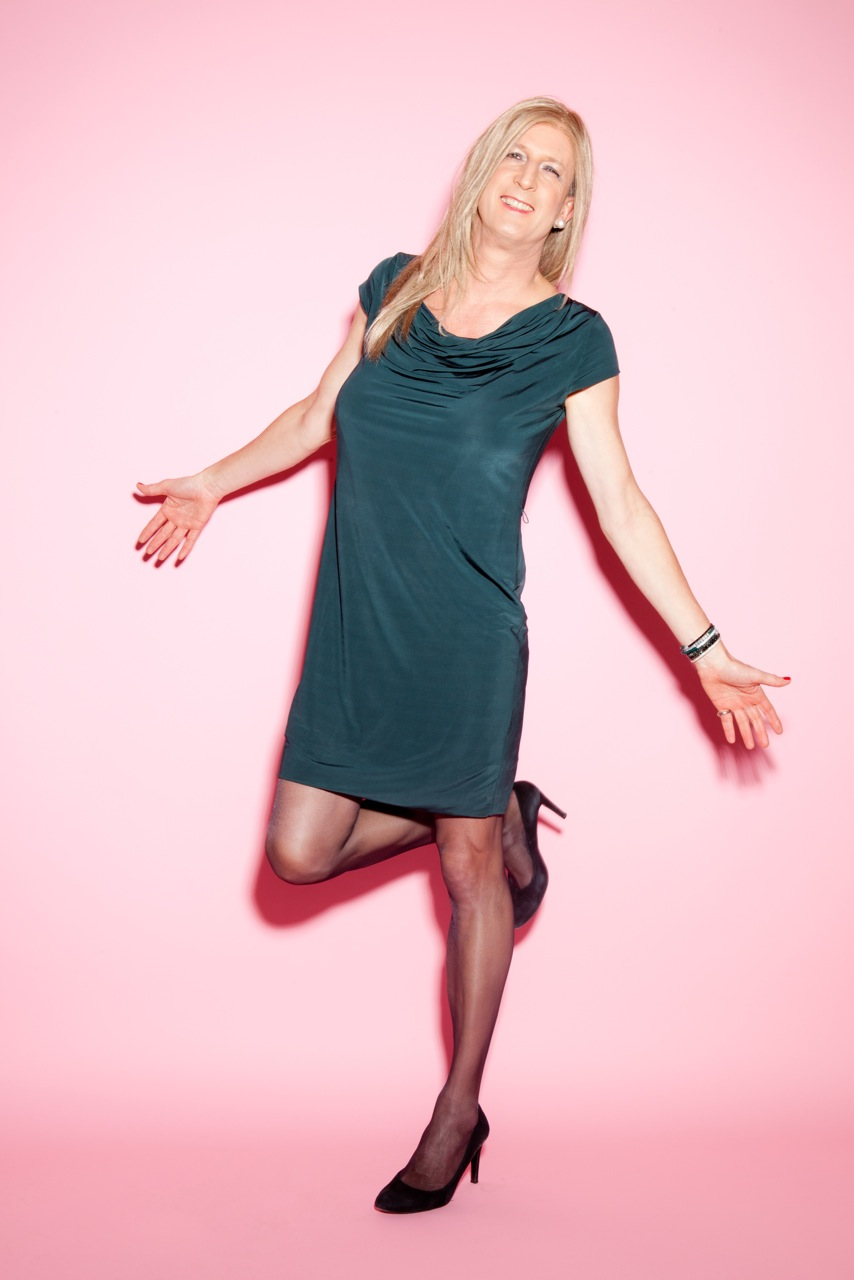
Christian Seidel as Christiane (2013)

In 2014, his book Die Frau in mir was published by Heyne Verlag and was on the Spiegel bestseller list. In it he reports on his experiences from several years of self-attempt to live as a woman. The director Dariush Rafiy filmed Seidel's Experiment in 2013 in the documentary Christian & Christiane for the TV channel Arte.

In 2015, he presented his 90-minute documentary film Die Himmlischen Hundert vom Maidan Platz (Nebesna Sotnja) on the occasion of the Maidan Memorial Days in Kyiv.

In 2016, his book Genderkey was published by Ariston Verlag.

In 2018, his book Ich komme was published by Heyne Verlag, and in it, he creates a picture of male sexuality using his own example.
