= See Girl Run =

- Theatrical release poster
- Directed by: Nate Meyer
- Written by: Nate Meyer
- Produced by: Nate Meyer; Jesse Sweet; Derrick Tseng
- Starring: Robin Tunney; Adam Scott; Jeremy Strong; William Sadler; Aubrey Dollar; Marylouise Burke; Josh Hamilton
- Cinematography: Jeremy Saulnier
- Edited by: Jane Rizzo
- Music by: Joseph Stephens
- Production company: Happy Couples Productions
- Distributed by: Phase 4 Films
- Release dates: March 11, 2012 (SXSW); April 26, 2013 (United States)
- Running time: 89 minutes
- Country: United States
- Language: English

See Girl Run is a 2012 American comedy film written and directed by Nate Meyer. The film stars Robin Tunney, Adam Scott, Jeremy Strong, William Sadler, Aubrey Dollar, Marylouise Burke and Josh Hamilton. The film was released on April 26, 2013, by Phase 4 Films.

== Cast ==
- Robin Tunney as Emmie
- Adam Scott as Jason
- Jeremy Strong as Brandon
- William Sadler as Marty
- Aubrey Dollar as Becky
- Marylouise Burke as Grandma
- Josh Hamilton as Graham
- Maureen Butler as Gail
- Larry Pine as Jason's Father
- J.P. Guimont as Kyle
- Meagan Moses as Tami
- Stephanie Andujar as Alicia
- Reza Salazar as Denilo
- Charles Techman as Jack
- Miles Doleac as Del

== Release ==
The film premiered at South by Southwest on March 11, 2012. The film was released on April 26, 2013, by Phase 4 Films.
