= Jeremy London =

American actor (born 1972)

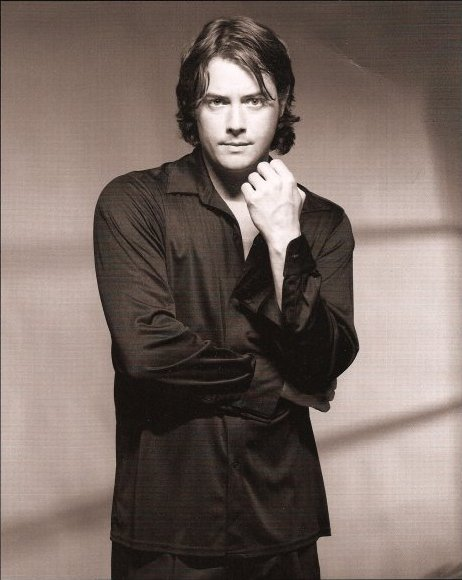
- Born: Jeremy Michael London; November 7, 1972 (age 54); San Diego, California, U.S.
- Occupation: Actor
- Years active: 1991–present
- Spouses: Astrid Rossol (m. 1996; div. 2002); Melissa Cunningham (m. 2006; div. 2011); Juliet Reeves (m. 2014)
- Children: 2
- Relatives: Jason London (twin brother)

Jeremy Michael London (born November 7, 1972) is an American actor. He is best known for his regular roles on Party of Five, 7th Heaven, and I'll Fly Away, a starring role in the 1995 comedy film Mallrats, as well as a notable supporting role in the Civil War epic Gods and Generals. London made his directorial debut with the 2013 horror film The Devil's Dozen, in which he also appeared.

== Early life ==
London was born in San Diego, California, the son of Debbie (née Osborn), a waitress, and Frank London, a sheet metal worker. He was raised mainly in DeSoto, Texas. After having divorced Jeremy's father, his mother moved the family 13 times in six years. His identical twin brother, Jason, is older by 27 minutes and is also an actor. Jeremy has worked mostly in television while Jason has opted for a career in feature films. The twins have acted alongside one another in the 2022 movie Hunt Club and in the February 3, 2003, episode of the WB's 7th Heaven, entitled "Smoking." They have also competed for the same role – Jeremy's first audition was for a part in the 1991 film The Man in the Moon, which Jason won, leaving Jeremy the part of his brother's stunt double.

The twin boys had a younger sister, Dedra, who was also an actor. Dedra London died in a car crash in 1992 at the age of 16.

== Career ==
London's first and second major television roles were playing Nathan on the critically acclaimed 1991–1993 drama series I'll Fly Away. His brother Jason stepped in for Jeremy for the final episode of the show.

In 1995 he played T.S. Quint in Kevin Smith's second film, Mallrats.

In 1995, he joined the cast of the Fox series Party of Five, playing Griffin Holbrook for three seasons, after serving as a recurring guest star. He then went on to play a young minister named Chandler Hampton on 7th Heaven from 2002 to 2004. His 7th Heaven character had a father with lung cancer, much like Jeremy's real-life family members. He has since acted in many television serials, television films and feature films.

London was a cast member during the fourth season of Celebrity Rehab with Dr. Drew, which premiered on VH1 in December 2010.

== Personal life ==
London and his wife Melissa Cunningham were married in September 2006. They divorced five years later. They have a son named Lyrik. London married Juliet Reeves on June 3, 2014, and they have one son named Wyatt who was born in June 2014.

In June 2010, Jeremy alleged that he was involved in a bizarre kidnapping, approached by a group of men in Palm Springs, Calif., and forced to drive around for 12 hours purchasing alcohol and using drugs. Though he swore the incident was real, his mother and brother made public statements doubting the events. Jeremy filed a restraining order against them, only to have it denied by a judge.

London was a cast member during the fourth season of Celebrity Rehab with Dr. Drew, which aired on VH1 from December 2010 to January 2011, and depicted his treatment for addiction at the Pasadena Recovery Center in Pasadena, California. The third episode of that season depicted discussions involving him, Dr. Drew Pinsky and London's wife, Melissa Cunningham, who was simultaneously being treated for addiction herself at a separate wing of the Center. His father, Frank, also appeared in Episode 7, which was filmed during Family Day, in which the patients discussed the effect of addiction on their family relationships.

On April 6, 2004, London was arrested in Los Angeles on suspicion of drug possession, driving with a suspended license, and vandalism. Earlier that same year, London was convicted of driving under the influence. He was ordered to pay a fine, placed on probation and complete a three-month first-offender drug and alcohol counseling program. London had an outstanding warrant for missed court hearing regarding driving without a license at the time of his April arrest.

London was charged with spousal battery in 2012 after an incident with his then wife, and in 2018 he was arrested for alleged domestic violence.

== Filmography ==
=== Film ===
Year	Title	Role	Notes
1991	In Broad Daylight	Teenager #1	TV movie
1991	A Seduction in Travis County	Delivery Boy	TV movie
1995	A Season of Hope	Mickey Hackett	TV movie
1995	A Mother's Gift	Adult John Deal	TV movie
1995	Mallrats	T.S. Quint	
1995	The Babysitter	Jack	
1995	Breaking Free	Rick Chilton	
1996	White Wolves II: Legend of the Wild	Mason	
1997	Levitation	Bob	
1997	Happenstance	Jeff	Short
1997	Bad to the Bone	Danny Wells	TV movie
1998	The Defenders: Taking the First	Wyman James	TV movie
1998	Get a Job	Tony Thompson/Philip	
2002	Romantic Comedy 101	Patrick	TV movie
2003	Gods and Generals	Captain Alexander "Sandie" Pendleton	
2003	Descendant	Ethan Poe/Frederick Usher	
2006	Kiss Me Again	Julian	
2006	Basilisk: The Serpent King	Dr. Harry McColl	TV movie
2006	What I Did for Love	James	TV movie
2008	The Grift	Jackson Armstrong	
2008	Ba'al	Dr. Lee Helm	TV movie
2008	Strokes	Wade Hamilton	TV movie
2008	Next of Kin	Chris	
2009	Balancing the Books	Andy	
2009	Chasing the Green	Adam Franklin	
2009	Laundry	Policeman Two	Short
2009	The Terminators	Kurt Ross	TV movie
2009	Lost Dream	Dr. Reeves	
2009	Do You Know Me?	Jake Farber	TV movie
2009	Wolvesbayne	Russel Bayne	TV movie
2009	The Divided	Aaron	
2010	House Under Siege	Ralph	
2010	Drop Dead Gorgeous	Robert Baker	Video
2010	Q for Death	Matt Lombardi	Video
2010	L.A. Harmony	Justin/Jack	Short
2010	Trance	Whateley	
2010	Alien Opponent	Brooklyn Davis	
2010	Hollywood & Wine	Jean Luc Marceau	
2012	The Martini Shot	Tony	
2012	Edge of Salvation	David Stevens	
2012	The Last Mark	Hoppy	
2013	Don't Pass Me By	Greg Phillips	
2013	The Devil's Dozen	Driver	
2013	Scavengers	Black Devert	
2013	Sink Hole	Gary	
2013	Rain from the Stars	Randy	
2014	7 Faces of Jack the Ripper	Henry	
2015	24 Hours	Jenkins	
2015	Seat of Justice	Matt Lombardi	
2015	One More Round	Brock Thornhill	
2015	Only God Can	FBI Agent #1	
2015	Buddy Hutchins	Random Parent	
2016	Last Man Club	Detective Lee	
2016	Girl in Woods	Jim	
2017	Against Identity	Ray Winters	Short
2017	Mississippi River Sharks	Jeremy London	TV movie
2017	Branded	Alexander	
2017	Blood Country	Webb	
2017	I Believe	Captain James Iberson	
2018	Cornbread Cosa Nostra	Hicks	
2018	Fury of the Fist and the Golden Fleece	Superfoot	
2018	Wasted Hours	Mr. Holmes	
2019	Panda	Marshall	Short
2019	Cross 3	Recon	
2020	The Dinner Party	Haley's Stepdad	
2021	Goodbye, Butterfly	The Realtor	
2021	Bottom Feeders	Uncle Zeke	
2021	Crypto Heads	Adam James	
2021	Demigod	Karl Schaffer	
2022	Tears of the Sun	Jesse	Short
2022	Moon Crash	General Madden	
2022	EnterFear: The Next Wave	Sheriff Charlton	
2022	Girl with a Gun	Cody	
2023	Hunt Club	Preston	
2023	Young, Sexy & Dead	Robert	
2023	The Black Mass	Patrick	
2023	Bright Ideas	Joe Cooke	
2023	Alien Vampire Busters	Officer Rick	
2023	Open	Erik	
2023	Butchers Bluff	Chris	
2024	Murder at Hollow Creek	Joe	
2024	Mr. Blue Shirt: The Inspiration	Brother Andrew	
2024	Spirit of Friendship	Older Billy/Narrator	
2024	Fear Cabin: The Last Weekend of Summer	Mr. Collins	
2025	Bone Face	Cronin	
2025	Neglected	Sloan	
2026	Amityville: Descendants of Darkness	Jay	
2026	Not My Dog	Carl	

=== Television ===
Year	Title	Role	Notes
1991–93	I'll Fly Away	Nathaniel Bedford	Main Cast
1993	Angel Falls	Sonny Snow	Main Cast
1995–2000	Party of Five	Griffin Holbrook	Recurring Cast: Season 2-3, Main Cast: Season 4-5
1997	Perversions of Science	Billy Rabe	Episode: "Anatomy Lesson"
1999	Hollywood Squares	Himself/Panelist	Recurring Panelist
1999	Journey to the Center of the Earth	Jonas Lytton	Episode: "Part I & II"
2001	The Outer Limits	Chris	Episode: "Flower Child"
2002–04	7th Heaven	Chandler Hampton	Main Cast: Season 7-8
2004	I Love the '90s	Himself	Main Guest
2004	Crossing Jordan	Louis Jeffries	Episode: "Out of Sight"
2005	Celebrity Poker Showdown	Himself/Contestant	Episode: "Tournament 7, Game 5"
2007	Tell Me You Love Me	Nate	Recurring Cast
2009	Whatever Happened To?	Himself	Episode: "Troubled Teens"
2010–11	Celebrity Rehab with Dr. Drew	Himself	Main Cast: Season 4, Guest: Season 5
2015	Celebrity Wife Swap	Himself	Episode: "Jeremy London/David & Jackie Siegel"
2016	MacGyver	Chuck Lawson	Episode: "Pliers"
2025	Hollywood Demons	Himself	Episode: "Stephen Collins, America’s Dad"
