= Jason London =

American actor (born 1972)

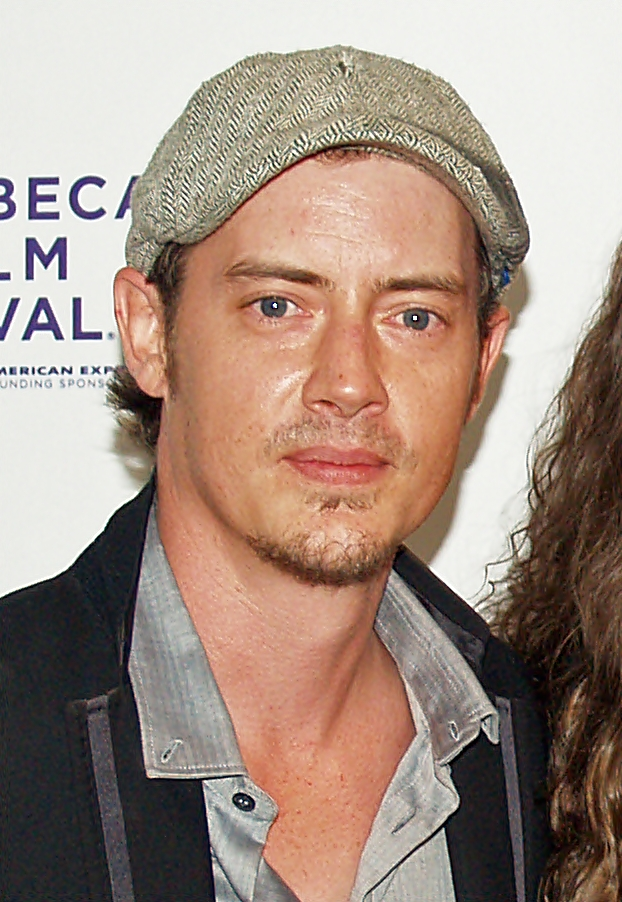
- London at the premiere of Killer Movie at Tribeca Film Festival
- Born: Jason Paul London; November 7, 1972 (age 53); San Diego, California, U.S.
- Occupation: Actor
- Years active: 1991–present
- Spouses: Charlie Spradling (m. 1997; div. 2006); Sofia Karstens (m. 2011)
- Children: 1
- Relatives: Jeremy London (twin brother)

Jason Paul London (born November 7, 1972) is an American actor. Since his breakout role as Reese Witherspoon's love interest Court Foster in The Man In the Moon (film debut, 1991), he has often featured as a leading man, with notable roles as Randall "Pink" Floyd in director Richard Linklater's film Dazed and Confused (1993), Bobby Ray in To Wong Foo, Thanks for Everything! Julie Newmar (1995), Tom Meyer in Broken Vessels (1998), Jesse in The Rage: Carrie 2 (1999), Todd Boomer in My Teacher's Wife (1999), Jason in Jason and the Argonauts (2000), Rick Rambis in Out Cold (2001), skateboard professional Jimmy Wilson in Grind (2003), Mike in Killer Movie (2008), Chet in The Martini Shot (2023), and Deacon in Neglected (2026).

== Early life ==
London was born in San Diego, California, the son of Debbie (née Osborn), a waitress, and Frank London, a sheet metal worker. He was raised mainly in DeSoto, Texas. After having divorced Jason's father, his mother moved the family 13 times in six years. His identical twin brother, Jeremy, is younger by 27 minutes and is also an actor, working mostly in television. The twins have acted alongside each other in the 2022 movie Hunt Club and in the February 3, 2003, episode of the WB's 7th Heaven, entitled "Smoking."

The twin boys had a younger sister, Dedra, who was also an actor. Dedra London died in a car accident in 1992 at the age of 16.

== Career ==
London began his career in his junior year of high school. His brother, Jeremy, wanted to audition for the movie The Man in the Moon (1991). London gave his brother a ride to the audition and tried for the part as well. He got the part and his brother was his stunt double.

London later received what would become his most popular role as Randall "Pink" Floyd in the movie Dazed and Confused (1993).

In 1995, he starred in the film Fall Time alongside David Arquette, Stephen Baldwin, and Mickey Rourke. The movie was premiered at the Sundance Film Festival and was nominated for the Grand Jury Prize, ultimately losing to The Brothers McMullen.

London has enjoyed success starring mostly as a rebellious, edgy young addict in feature films such as Broken Vessels (1998) and $pent (2000). He starred as Jason in the NBC miniseries Jason and the Argonauts (2000). He also starred in Poor White Trash (2000) playing sleazy ladies' man Brian Ross.

He costarred with Todd Field in the 1998 film Broken Vessels . The movie was critically acclaimed. Roger Ebert of the Chicago Sun-Times gave it three stars out of four, saying "What makes the movie special is the way both lead actors find the right quiet notes for their performances.". Londons performance in particular was praised, with Leonard Klady of Variety writing “At the center of Broken Vessels are two exceptionally compelling performances by Field and London. . .London works his boyish persona for all its worth and his slide from cute to sinister occurs with brilliant ease.". The film won the Audience Award for Feature Film at the 1998 LA Film Festival

London starred as snowboarder Rick Rambis in the 2001 Touchstone Pictures film Out Cold . Also starring are Lee Majors and Willie Garson. Zach Galifianakis plays the role of London’s snowboarding buddy Luke. The film is considered a “cult classic”.

He memorably portrayed pro skateboarding legend Jimmy Wilson in the movie Grind (2003), with his character being a focal point of the plot, alongside Adam Brody, Bam Margera and Tom Green

Also in 2003, London starred in the film Wasabi Tuna alongside Antonio Sabàto Jr., Tim Meadows, Alexis Arquette, and Anna Nicole Smith. It is a Halloween comedy set in West Hollywood, California.

In 2008 London starred in Killer Movie alongside Paul Wesley, Kaley Cuoco, Leighton Meester and Torrey Devitto. It premiered at the Tribeca Film Festival and was a financial success.

London portrayed Mark, the local newspaper editor, in the Hallmark Channel television movie, The Wishing Well (2010), which also starred Jordan Ladd and Ernest Borgnine.

In 2023, London starred in the film The Martini Shot alongside Matthew Modine, Fiona Glascott, and John Cleese. The movie was critically acclaimed, and won numerous awards for Best Film and Best Ensemble Cast. Davide Abbatescianni of Cineuropa gave the film a positive review and wrote, “These days, it’s extremely rare to find such a small film with such a big heart. With tact, creativity and simplicity, Stephen Wallis has crafted a beautiful picture about life, death, love and art…”

He appeared in the film Neglected , alongside Josh Duhamel, Dylan Sprouse, and his brother Jeremy London. The film saw theatrical release May 8, 2026.

In addition to his film and TV work, London also appeared in Aerosmith's 1993 video "Amazing" with Alicia Silverstone.

== Personal life ==
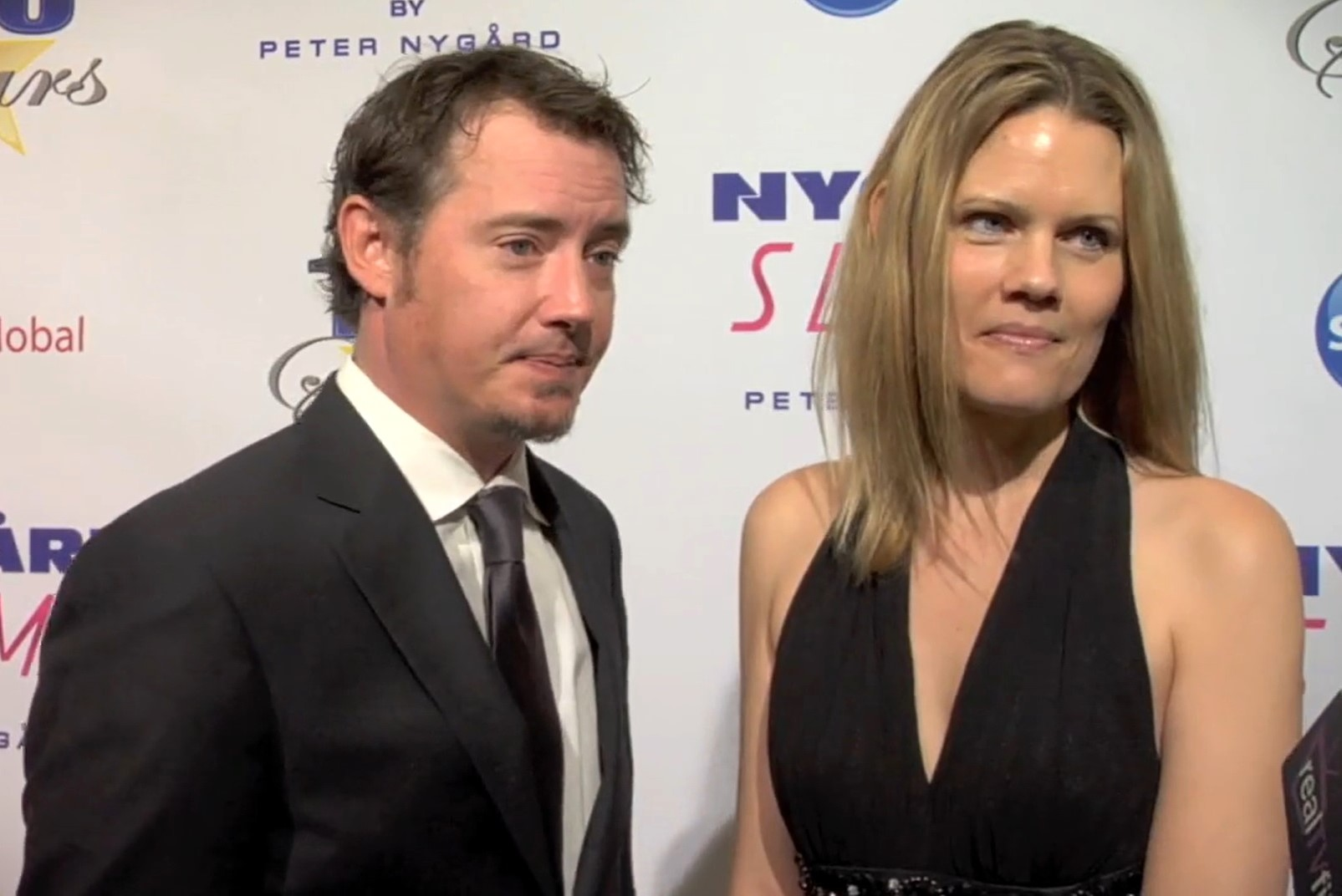
London, Sofia Karstens at Night of 100 Stars 2015

In November 2010, London became engaged to actress Sofia Karstens. They married on July 16, 2011, at the home of his wife's parents in North Hero, Vermont.

London was arrested in 2013 for punching a bouncer, and again in 2021 for public intoxication.

== Filmography ==
=== Film ===
Year	Title	Role	Notes
1991	Blood Ties	Cody Puckett	TV movie
1991	The Man in the Moon	Court Foster	
1991	False Arrest	Eric	TV movie
1991	December	Russell Littlejohn	
1993	Dazed and Confused	Randall "Pink" Floyd	
1993	I'll Fly Away: Then and Now	Nathaniel Bedford	TV movie
1993	A Matter of Justice	Corporal Chris Randall Brown	TV movie
1994	Safe Passage	Gideon Singer	
1995	Fall Time	Tim	
1995	To Wong Foo, Thanks for Everything! Julie Newmar	Bobby Ray	
1995	My Teacher's Wife	Todd Boomer	
1996	If These Walls Could Talk	Kevin Donnelly	TV movie
1996	Countdown	Chris Murdoch	
1997	Friends 'Til the End	Simon	TV movie
1997	Mixed Signals	Alex	
1998	Broken Vessels	Tom	
1999	Frontline	Robert	
1999	Alien Cargo	Christopher McNiel	TV movie
1999	The Rage: Carrie 2	Jesse Ryan	
2000	Poor White Trash	Brian Ross	
2000	The Hound of the Baskervilles	Sir Henry	TV movie
2000	$pent	Max	
2001	Out Cold	Rick Rambis	
2002	A Midsummer Night's Rave	Stosh	
2003	Last Stand	Private James Cavanaugh	short
2003	Dracula II: Ascension	Luke	Video
2003	Grind	Jimmy Wilson	
2003	Wasabi Tuna	Evan	
2004	Identity Theft: The Michelle Brown Story	Justin	TV movie
2004	To Kill a Mockumentary	Tucker	Video
2005	Out of the Woods	Matt Fleming	TV movie
2005	The Prophecy: Uprising	Simon	Video
2005	Dracula III: Legacy	Luke	Video
2005	The Prophecy: Forsaken	Simon	Video
2006	Greed	Robert	
2006	Glass House: The Good Mother	Ben Koch	Video
2007	Adventures of Johnny Tao	Jimmy Dow	
2007	Throwing Stars	Bobby	
2007	Showdown at Area 51	Jake Townsend	
2008	All Roads Lead Home	Cody	
2008	Killer Movie	Mike	
2009	The Evolution of Ethan Baskin	Ethan Baskin	Short
2009	The Devil's Tomb	Hicks	
2009	Sutures	Detective Zane	
2009	The Wishing Well	Mark Jansen	TV movie
2009	A Golden Christmas	Mitch	TV movie
2010	The Putt Putt Syndrome	Johnny	
2010	Fight or Flight	Cale	
2010	Monsterwolf	Yale	TV movie
2010	The Black Belle	Jason London	
2011	Lucy	The Boss	Short
2011	51	Aaron "Shoes" Schumacher	
2011	Maskerade	Arthur Brown	
2011	Shooting for Something Else	Jack	Short
2011	The Lamp	Stanley Walters	
2011	Snow Beast	Barry	
2011	The Greatest Script Ever Written	Scott	Short
2011	Storm War	David Grange	
2012	Avarice	Jason	
2012	Smitty	Russell	
2012	A Night of Nightmares	Phil Crater	
2012	Fatal Call	Mitch Harwell	
2012	The Accidental Missionary	Ross Turner	
2013	Wiener Dog Nationals	Phil Jack	
2014	Roswell FM	Kurt Buzlerd	
2014	Untold	Jerry	
2015	A Perfect Vacation	Rich Napier	
2015	Zombie Shark	Maxwell Cage	TV movie
2015	Love in Tokyo	Joey	
2015	My First Miracle	Father Lawrence	
2016	Spoken Word	Officer Owens	Short
2016	Dam Sharks	Tanner Brooks	TV movie
2016	As Far as the Eye Can See	Jack Ridge	
2016	Wiener Dog Internationals	Phil Jack	
2017	The Horse Dancer	Sheriff Dave	
2017	Nightworld	Brett Anderson	
2017	Safe	Frank Kovac	
2017	After School Special	Bob Kent	
2017	Mississippi River Sharks	Jason London	TV movie
2017	Branded	Edwin	
2017	Trafficked	Roy	
2017	Little Drummer Girl	Thomas McCarty	Short
2017	Do I Say I Do?	Burt	
2017	Hostage X	-	
2017	Crystal	Officer Jake Stannich	
2018	Get Married or Die	Max	
2018	Amanda and the Fox	Amanda's Dad	
2018	The Second Coming of Christ	John Zachary	
2018	Urban Country	David	
2018	Fury of the Fist and the Golden Fleece	Lightning Leg	
2018	The Christmas Contract	Luc Doucette	TV movie
2019	Cecil	Tim Stevens	
2019	Marriage Killer	Robert/Husband	
2019	Full Count	Ted Young	
2019	A Walk with Grace	Pastor Tom Grey	
2019	Acceleration	Richie	
2020	Horse Camp: A Love Tail	Dave	
2021	Love Is on the Air	Adam Smasher	
2021	Weekend Warriors	Joey	
2021	Mr. Birthday	Barry	
2022	Drowning in Secrets	Major Peter Sullivan	TV movie
2022	Blackwater Blues	Castor Bennington	Short
2022	Merry Ex-Mas	Carl	
2023	Hunt Club	Teddy	
2023	Blood Harvest	Walter	
2023	Half Dead Fred	Matthew	
2023	The Martini Shot	Chet	
2024	Deadly Justice	Barnes	
2024	Murder at Hollow Creek	Rick	
2024	Joe Baby	Flanagan	
2024	Campton Manor	Jack	
2025	Neglected	Deacon	
2026	Afterwards	Taran	

=== Television ===
Year	Title	Role	Notes
1993	Route 66	Matt	Episode: "Everybody's a Hero"
1993	Tales from the Crypt	Henderson	Episode: "House of Horror"
1995	The Outer Limits	Jay Patton	Episode: "Caught in the Act"
2000	Jason and the Argonauts	Jason	Episode: "Part I & II"
2001	Night Visions	Richard Lansky	Episode: "The Passenger List/Bokor"
2003	7th Heaven	Sid Hampton	Episode: "Smoking"
2004	CSI: Crime Scene Investigation	Keith Garbett	Episode: "Mea Culpa"
2005-07	Wildfire	Bobby	Recurring Cast: Season 1-2, Guest: Season 3
2006	Criminal Minds	William Lee	Episode: "Aftermath"
2007	Grey's Anatomy	Jeff Pope	Episode: "Didn't We Almost Have It All?"
2007	Saving Grace	Randy Matsin	Recurring Cast: Season 1
2008	Ghost Whisperer	Dr. Ryan Heller	Episode: "Big Chills"
2010	NCIS	Dwight Kasdan	Episode: "Guilty Pleasures"
2011	Hindsight News	Mikey C.	Episode: "Food and Nutrition"
2012	Dallas	Rick Lobell	Episode: "The Last Hurrah"
2012	Scandal	Skip Pierce	Episode: "Defiance"
2012	Lego Hero Factory	Nathan Evo	Recurring Cast
2013	Major Crimes	Chris Harris	Episode: "Pick Your Poison"
2018	Falling for Angels	Chase	Episode: "Bel Air"

=== Music Videos ===
Year	Artist	Song	Role
1993	Aerosmith	"Amazing"	Teenage Boy
1994	Aerosmith	"Crazy"	Hitchhiker

== Awards and nominations ==
Award	Year	Category	Recipient(s)	Result
Young Artist Awards	1994	Best Youth Actor Co-Starring in a Motion Picture Drama	Dazed and Confused	Nominated
Hoboken International Film Festival	2015	Jury Award – Best Supporting Actor	Awaken	Won
Hill Country Film Festival	2017	Best Actor	As Far as the Eye Can See	Won
International Christian Film Festival	2017	Best Actor: Feature Film	The Second Coming of Christ	Nominated
Actors Awards, Los Angeles	2018	Best Actor	Marriage Killer	Nominated
New York City International Film Festival	2019	Best Feature Film	Marriage Killer	Nominated
New York City International Film Festival	2019	Best Supporting Actor in a Feature Film	Marriage Killer	Nominated
Rome Prisma Independent Film Awards	2023	Best Supporting Actor	Afterwards	Won
Triloka International Filmfare Awards	2023	Best Supporting Actor	Afterwards	Won
Northeast Film Festival	2024	Best Ensemble Cast	The Martini Shot	Won
Beaufort International Film Festival	2024	Best Ensemble Cast	The Martini Shot	Won
Cobb International Film Festival	2024	Best Ensemble in a Feature Film	The Martini Shot	Won
Prison City Film Festival	2025	Major's Award – Best Supporting Actor	Afterwards	Won
