= Charlie Spradling =

Actress from the United States

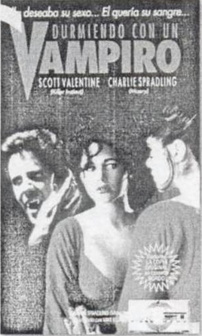
- Spradling in the Spanish poster of To Sleep with a Vampire (1993)
- Born: Charlie Lynn Spradling; September 27, 1968 (age 58); Fort Worth, Texas, U.S.
- Occupation: Actress
- Years active: 1988–2002
- Height: 5 ft 7 in (170 cm)
- Spouse: Jason London (m. 1997; div. 2006)
- Children: 1

Charlie Lynn Spradling (born September 27, 1968) is a retired American actress.

== Early years ==
Spradling was born September 27, 1968, in Fort Worth, Texas, where she was also raised.

== Career ==
Spradling's first appearance in film was in the 1988 cult science fiction horror film The Blob.

Mainly active throughout the 1980s and 1990s, Spradling is primarily known for her acting roles and appearances in horror films such as Meridian: Kiss of the Beast (1990), or Puppet Master II (1990). She has also had small appearances in the television series Twin Peaks and the film Wild at Heart (1990), both by David Lynch.

== Personal life ==
Spradling married actor Jason London in 1997. The couple have a daughter. They divorced in 2006.

== Filmography ==
Film

Year	Title	Role	Notes
1988	The Blob	Co-Eds	
1991	Twice Dead	Tina	
1990	Meridian: Kiss of the Beast	Gina	Direct-to-video
1990	Wild at Heart	Irma	The film won the Palm d'Or at the 1990 Cannes Film Festival
1990	Mirror, Mirror	Charleen Kane	
1990	Puppet Master II	Wanda	Direct-to-video
1990	Ski School	Paulette	
1991	The Doors	CBS Girl Backstage	
1991	Caged Fear	Joy	
1992	Bad Channels	Cookie	Direct-to-video
1993	To Sleep with a Vampire	Nina	
1994	Inside the Goldmine	Stockard	
1994	Angel of Destruction	Brit Alwood	
1997	Convict 762	Helena	
1997	Johnny Skidmarks	Lorraine	
1998	Broken Vessels	Ginger	
2000	$pent	Brigette	
2002	A Midsummer Night's Rave	Stosh's Babe	

Television

Year	Title	Role	Notes
1988	Full House	Rhonda	Episode: "Cutting It Close"
1988–1989	Growing Pains	Tawny/Tawney	Episodes: "Mandingo" and " Guess Who's Coming to Dinner?"
1989	Married... with Children	Murphy	Episode: "Requiem for a Dead Barber"
1990	The Bradys	Teri Dickinson	Episode: "Hat in the Ring"
1990	Twin Peaks	Swabbie	Season 1, Episode 3: "Episode #1.3"
1994	Dead at 21	Glenna	Episode: "Cry Baby Cry"
1994–1997	Viper	Dominique/Anna	Episodes: "Shutdown" and "Ghost"
1997	Pacific Blue	Zandy Mason	Episode: "Full Moon"
2000	NYPD Blue	Stacey Mangrini	Episode: "Roll Out the Barrel"
