= Barbie as the Princess and the Pauper =

- DVD/VHS Cover
- Directed by: William Lau
- Written by: Cliff Ruby; Elana Lesser
- Based on: The Prince and the Pauper by Mark Twain
- Produced by: Jesyca C. Durchin; Jennifer Twiner McCarron
- Starring: Kelly Sheridan; Mark Hildreth; Alessandro Juliani; Ian James Corlett; Kathleen Barr; Martin Short
- Narrated by: Kelly Sheridan
- Edited by: Greg Richardson
- Music by: Arnie Roth; Megan Cavallari
- Production companies: Mainframe Entertainment; Mattel Entertainment
- Distributed by: North America: Lions Gate Home Entertainment (Family Home Entertainment); Overseas: Universal Pictures Video; UK and Ireland: Right Entertainment
- Release date: September 28, 2004
- Running time: 85 minutes
- Countries: Canada; United States
- Language: English

Barbie as the Princess and the Pauper is a 2004 CGI-animated musical fantasy film. It was released to video on September 28, 2004, and made its television premiere on Nickelodeon on November 14, 2004.

This film is the first musical in the Barbie series. It was directed by William Lau and stars the voice of Kelly Sheridan as the Barbie protagonists, Princess Anneliese and Erika. The plot is loosely inspired by the 1881 Mark Twain novel The Prince and the Pauper, and it is the first Barbie film that completely excludes fantastic elements (fairies, magic, mermaids), which were a usual part of Barbie franchise. It is generally regarded as one of the best films in the franchise and has secured a strong cult following.

Songs for the film were composed by Amy Powers, Megan Cavallari, and Rob Hudnut, who also executive-produced the film. The film was nominated for six DVD Exclusive Awards.

== Plot ==
In a kingdom, a blonde princess and a brunette pauper are born at the same time. Several years later, Princess Anneliese is affianced by her mother, Queen Genevieve, to the wealthy King Dominick to save their nearly bankrupt royal treasury; however, Anneliese is in love with her young tutor Julian. The Pauper, Erika, is an indentured servant, working off her parents' debt at Madame Carp's Dress Emporium, which supplies the palace with clothes; however, she dreams of becoming a singer and seeing the world.

Unbeknownst to the Queen, the reason behind the kingdom's bankruptcy is that her adviser Preminger has been stealing gold and emptying the royal mines. Upon learning from his henchmen, Nick and Nack, that the Queen has arranged Anneliese's marriage to King Dominick, he decides to make Anneliese 'mysteriously vanish'. Preminger plans to pretend that he has found the Princess, earning a betrothal to her, which would allow him to become king himself.

Julian takes Anneliese for a day out into the kingdom so that she can be free for once; there, she witnesses the poverty caused by the kingdom's bankruptcy. Anneliese hears Erika performing in the street to earn money, but Madame Carp steals the earnings. Anneliese and Erika bond and learn that they are identical in appearance, apart from their hair color and the crown-shaped birthmark on Anneliese's shoulder. That night, Anneliese and her cat Serafina are kidnapped by Nick and Nack, who leave a forged letter saying she ran away.

Julian asks Erika to impersonate Anneliese, saving the engagement while he can rescue the Princess. Preminger is surprised when Erika, disguised as Anneliese, presents herself at the palace. Over time, Erika and King Dominick fall in love, but Erika worries about what will happen if she is found out.

The real Anneliese escapes, but the guards, having seen Erika, mistake Anneliese for an imposter. Mistaking Anneliese for Erika, Madame Carp forces Anneliese into her shop and locks her inside. Julian overhears Preminger's plans but is discovered and abducted.

Anneliese has Serafina take her ring and a tag from the dress shop so someone can find her; unfortunately, Preminger and his dog Midas intercept her. Preminger takes Anneliese to the mines, where she is imprisoned with Julian after Nick and Nack cause a cave-in. Preminger returns to the palace, where he exposes Erika as a fake and has her imprisoned. Preminger convinces the Queen that Anneliese has died and that he has supposedly come into great wealth during his travels. With no other options, she reluctantly agrees to marry him to save the Kingdom.

Erika escapes the dungeon by singing a lullaby, causing the guard to fall asleep so she can take his keys. She is aided by King Dominick, who suspects Preminger of lying. Meanwhile, Anneliese and Julian find out how to restore the kingdom's resources with some geodes filled with crystals; the two then confess their love for each other. Erika's barking cat, Wolfie, unearths a mine shaft, and the group escapes by flooding the room and floating towards the surface in a barrel.

At the Queen and Preminger's wedding, Anneliese arrives, proves her identity with her birthmark, and reveals the truth about Preminger. After a brief chase, Preminger is arrested along with Nick and Nack. Anneliese tells her mother that she wants to marry Julian and that they can help save the kingdom. Soon after, the kingdom's prosperity is restored thanks to the crystals in the mine. Madame Carp is no longer patronized by the palace and goes out of business. With her debt finally paid, Erika leaves to become a renowned singer. Before her departure, Dominick proposes to her, but she politely declines by stating she still wishes to live out her dream as a singer. After touring the world, Erika feels her heart lies at home, and returns to her kingdom where she marries Dominick. Anneliese and Erika have a double wedding, and they and their husbands ride off in a carriage together.

== Cast ==
- Kelly Sheridan as Princess Anneliese (speaking voice), Erika (speaking voice), and Narrator
  - Melissa Lyons as Princess Anneliese (singing voice)
  - Julie Stevens as Erika (singing voice)
- Alessandro Juliani as Julian
- Mark Hildreth as King Dominick (speaking voice)
  - Mark Luna as King Dominick (singing voice)
- Martin Short as Preminger
- Kathleen Barr as Serafina / Bertie
- Ian James Corlett as Wolfie
- Ellen Kennedy as Queen Genevieve
- Pam Hyatt as Madame Carp
- Brian Drummond as Nick
- Jan Rabson as Nack / Midas
- Colin Murdock as the Royal Scheduler
- Janyse Jaud as a Palace Maid
- Lee Tockar as Ambassador Bismarck
- Garry Chalk as Herve
- Roger Monk as the Minister

== Songs ==
Barbie as the Princess and the Pauper is the first musical in the series of Barbie CGI films. It features seven original songs composed by Amy Powers and Megan Cavallari with an original score by Arnie Roth, performed by the London Symphonic Orchestra and the Czech Philharmonic Chamber Orchestra. The entire soundtrack (including popular duets and the opening orchestral theme) can be found on the "Barbie Sings! The Princess Movie Song Collection" CD, released by Mattel in 2004.

The songs in the film are, in chronological order, as follows.

1. "Free" – Julie Stevens (Erika) & Melissa Lyons (Anneliese)
2. "How Can I Refuse?" – Martin Short (Preminger)
3. "Written in Your Heart" (Prelude) – Julie Stevens (Erika)
4. "I Am a Girl Like You" – Julie Stevens (Erika) & Melissa Lyons (Anneliese)
5. "To Be a Princess" – Alessandro Juliani (Julian) & Julie Stevens (Erika)
6. "The Cat's Meow" – Julie Stevens (Erika)
7. "If You Love Me for Me" – Julie Stevens (Erika) & Mark Luna (Dominick)
8. "How Can You Refuse?" (Reprise) – Martin Short (Preminger)
9. "Written in Your Heart" (Finale) – Julie Stevens (Erika) & Melissa Lyons (Anneliese)
10. "I'm on My Way" – Sara Niemietz

== Release ==
The DVD and VHS were released on September 28, 2004, and distributed by Lionsgate Home Entertainment. The film was re-released on January 5, 2010, by Universal Pictures Home Entertainment. The DVD also included a CD containing seven songs from the film soundtrack.

Entertainment Rights secured non-American TV and home video distribution rights to the movie in March 2004, releasing the film on VHS and DVD through Universal Pictures Video worldwide, alongside their Right Entertainment subsidiary in the UK and Ireland.

== Reception ==
=== Critical response ===
Barbie as the Princess and the Pauper received generally positive reviews from entertainment critics. Steve Evans of DVD Verdict called it "wholesome entertainment" with "sweet songs tunefully sung" though lacking in grown-up humor. D. Liebenson of The Video Librarian praised Barbie's "virtuoso performance", and wrote, "If not altogether faithful to the source material, this impressive production is still a class act, and another jewel in Barbie's crown." Reviewing the film for the South China Morning Post, Karmel Schreyer noted a "a girl-power twist" on the original Mark Twain tale, and wrote that "the story includes all the elements that make it a worthwhile watch: duty, responsibility, compassion, free will – and, of course, a love interest." Describing the story as "a fascinatingly nuanced line between following one's heart [...] and doing one's duty", Brendan Howard of Video Store praised the film's animation, music and voice talent as "top-notch", but was disappointed with the DVD extras, which he called "essentially a serving of karaoke and commercials".

James Lileks of the Star Tribune wrote favourably of the film's "hummable tunes with clever lyrics, fine characters and a scathing indictment of the inequities of the feudal system" and dubbed it "the "Citizen Kane" of the [children's film] genre" due to its unusually high quality. Mandi Bierly of Entertainment Weekly scored it a B+, noting a generally "feminist" story. TV Guide's Robert Pardi scored it 2.5/4, praising the "peppy score" and classic story as distinguishing an otherwise "ordinary Mattel-icized version of the classic tale".

Reviewing the film for Common Sense Media, Tracy Moore found the animation quality was improved from previous CGI Barbie films, and advised that parents "may appreciate attention drawn to class inequality, and the precious few scenes focusing on girls liking science, books, and less passive pursuits." Moore wrote that the film "almost succeed[s]" in updating traditional models for girls' entertainment, as Princess Anneliese and Erika are shown "putting [their interests] first over romance [...] But the big finish still centers around them pairing off, fairy-tale style." In The Dallas Morning News, Nancy Churnin praised the lead characters as "bold and brainy" and found, "one of the sweetest aspects of this film is the utter absence of jealousy between Anneliese and Erika. Good things happen, ultimately, because of their mutual friendship and support."

=== Awards ===
Year	Award	Category	Work(s)	Recipient(s)	Result	Reference
2005	DVD Exclusive Award					
2005	DVD Exclusive Award	Best Animated DVD Premiere Movie	Barbie as The Princess and the Pauper	Jesyca C. Durchin; Jennifer Twiner McCarron	Nominated	
2005	DVD Exclusive Award	Best Director (of a DVD Premiere Movie)	Barbie as The Princess and the Pauper	William Lau	Nominated	
2005	DVD Exclusive Award	Best Original Score (for a DVD Premiere Movie)	Barbie as The Princess and the Pauper	Arnie Roth	Nominated	
2005	DVD Exclusive Award	Best Visual Effects (in a DVD Premiere Movie)	Barbie as The Princess and the Pauper	Tricia Jellis	Nominated	
2005	DVD Exclusive Award	Best Animated Character Performance (Voice and Animation in a DVD Premiere Movie)	Preminger	Martin Short (voice); Gino Nichele (animation director); William Lau (animation director); Jean Gillmore (character designer)	Nominated	
2005	DVD Exclusive Award	Best Original Song (in a DVD Premiere Movie)	"To Be A Princess"	Alessandro Juliani (performer); Julie Stevens (performer); Megan Cavallari (music); Amy Powers (lyrics); Rob Hudnut (lyrics)	Nominated	

== Video game ==
A video game for Game Boy Advance, PC, and Macintosh was released in 2004 by Vivendi Universal Games. In the Game Boy Advance title, the plot follows that of the movie: players must thwart Preminger's attempt to take over the kingdom by marrying Anneliese. Players control four characters: Anneliese, Erika, Serafina, and Wolfie.

== Cultural impact and legacy ==
Barbie as the Princess and the Pauper is widely considered the best film of the Barbie animated film franchise, frequently topping rankings and lists by entertainment websites. Rappler's Mikaela de Castro called it the franchise's "magnum opus". It has a strong cult following. The film's popularity is often attributed to its songs, especially "I Am a Girl Like You", which Eleanor Burnard of Collider wrote have become "staples of millennial and Gen-Z pop culture". According to a Buzzfeed article by Sara Thompson, Barbie as the Princess and the Pauper is among the films and shows that represent "peak 2000s girl culture".

In the 2020s, the film went viral across TikTok and other forms of social media, with the character Preminger becoming popular as the basis of memes and remixes. As of September 2023, the video tag #preminger had accumulated over 318 million views across the TikTok app. Compilations of Preminger's scenes are also popular on YouTube.

In January 2024, to commemorate the film's 20th anniversary many cast and crew members including songwriters Megan Cavallari and Amy Powers, producers Jennifer McCarron and Rob Hudnut, editor Greg Richardson, director William Lau, singers Julie Stevens and Melissa Lyons and voice actors Kelly Sheridan and Brian Drummond reunited by partaking in a 1-hour and a half livestream on YouTube on The Tammy Tuckey Show. The event had been organised ahead of time.
