= Spent (film) =

- Directed by: Gil Cates Jr.
- Written by: Gil Cates Jr.
- Produced by: Jordan Summers; Rana Joy Glickman; Gil Cates Jr.
- Starring: Jason London; Charlie Spradling; Erin Beaux; Phill Lewis
- Cinematography: Robert D. Tomer
- Edited by: Jonathan Cates
- Music by: Stan Ridgway
- Distributed by: Regent Entertainment
- Release date: July 21, 2000 (US)
- Running time: 91 minutes
- Country: United States
- Language: English
- Box office: $9,287

Spent (stylized as $pent) is a 2000 American drama film directed by Gil Cates Jr. and starring Jason London, Charlie Spradling, and Gil Cates Jr.

== Plot ==
An unemployed actor uses his skills to con everyone he knows into lending or giving him money to pay off his debts.

== Cast ==
- Jason London as Max
- Charlie Spradling as Brigette
- Phill Lewis as Doug
- Erin Beaux as Nathan
- James Parks as Grant
- Richmond Arquette as Jay
- Barbara Barrie as Mrs. Walsh
- Gilbert Cates as Mr. Walsh
- Rain Phoenix as Kimberly
- Kaela Dobkin as Jessica

== Reception ==
The film received generally unfavorable reviews on Metacritic.com, getting 34/100 based on 8 critics.
