= John Emmet Tracy =

American-Canadian actor

- Born: Chicago, Illinois
- Citizenship: United States; Canada
- Education: Bachelor's degree in Theatre
- Alma mater: Rose Bruford College
- Occupation: Actor
- Notable credits: Yellowstone; iZombie; Batwoman
- Family: David Tracy (uncle)
- Website: johnemmettracy.com

John Emmet Tracy is an American-Canadian actor who has appeared in various film, television, and stage roles. He currently has a recurring role as Ellis Steele on the American television series Yellowstone. He has previously held recurring roles on series like Batwoman and iZombie and was a series regular on the Syfy series Olympus. Tracy has also appeared in films including American Mary (2012), If I Stay (2014), and Fifty Shades Freed (2018) and voiced the role of Thomas Jefferson in the video game Assassin's Creed III (2012).

== Early life and education ==
Tracy was born in Chicago, Illinois, and raised in both Chicago and Milwaukee, Wisconsin. In high school, he was an exchange at Lilian Baylis School in England. He also took courses at Royal Academy of Dramatic Art and after starting his university studies in the United States, transferred to Rose Bruford College in England, earning a Bachelor's degree in Theatre. Additionally, he studied under Lynn Redgrave and Uta Hagen.

== Career ==
Tracy began his career primarily as a stage actor. In the late 1990s, he played the title role in a production of Hamlet that toured Japan for a year. He subsequently appeared in stage, film, and television productions in Los Angeles and Vancouver, British Columbia. In the early 2010s, he earned roles in American television series like Smallville, Fringe, and The Killing. Tracy was also among 11 actors chosen for the International Actors' Fellowship at Shakespeare's Globe Theatre in London. Between 2012 and 2014, he appeared in the films, American Mary and If I Stay and also provided the voice of Thomas Jefferson for the video game, Assassin's Creed III.

In March 2013, Tracy starred in a production of Terminus at Performance Works in Vancouver. He won the Jessie Richardson Theatre Award for Outstanding Lead Actor for this performance. In 2014, he received a second Outstanding Lead Actor nomination for his performance as Sharky in a production of The Seafarer at Vancouver's Pacific Theatre. That year, Tracy also created, produced, and performed in The 24 Hour Shakespeare Project which entailed performing abridged productions of each of William Shakespeare's 38 plays over the course of 24 hours on April 23 (Shakespeare's 450th birthday). The event, which was staged at Blake Snyder Theatre at Go Studios, raised money for the British Columbia Children's Hospital.

In 2015, he appeared as Pallas, a series regular role, in the Syfy series, Olympus. In 2017, Tracy was nominated for his third Jessie Richardson Theatre Award for his performance as Anthony in Outside Mullingar at Pacific Theatre. Following several more film and television parts, he earned recurring roles as Enzo Lambert in iZombie and August Cartwright in Batwoman (both on The CW) in 2018 and 2019. That same year, he appeared as the lead role in the improvised feature film Open for Submissions.

In 2019, it was announced that Tracy would be cast in a recurring role on Paramount Network's Yellowstone. He initially appeared in the third season as Ellis Steele, a land acquisition attorney who represents Fortune 500 companies. He has also appeared in the series' fourth and fifth seasons, running through the series finale in 2024.

In 2025, Tracy appeared in two episodes of FBI: International as well as one episode of Fire Country.

== Personal life ==
Tracy is a dual citizen of the United States and Canada. He is the nephew of Catholic theologian David Tracy.

== Filmography ==
=== Film ===
List of selected film roles
Year	Title	Role	Notes	Ref
2012	American Mary	Detective Dolor	Horror film	
2014	If I Stay	Surgeon		
2014	The Surface	Bank manager		
2015	The Mary Alice Brandon File	Edgar John Brandon		
2016	The BFG	Palace staff		
2016	Stagecoach: The Texas Jack Story	Hank Holliday		
2018	Fifty Shades Freed	Troy Whelan		
2018	The Bad Seed	Mark Wiggins		
2019	Open for Submissions	Desmond Baggs		

=== Television ===
List of selected television roles
Year	Title	Role	Notes	Ref
2010	Smallville	Dr. Alfonso	Episode 1.5: "Isis"	
2010	Sanctuary	British museum curator	Episode 3.9: "Vigilante"	
2010, 2017–2018	Supernatural	Mercury / John Driscoll	3 episodes	
2011	Fringe	ER doctor	Episode 3.19: "Lysergic Acid Diethylamide"	
2011	Psych	Charles Wignall	Episode 6.1: "Shawn Rescues Darth Vader"	
2012	The Killing	Officer Flynn	Episode 2.7: "Keylela"	
2012	Fairly Legal	Mike Duffy	Episode 2.10: "Shattered"	
2010, 2016	Motive		2 episodes	
2013	Cedar Cove	Loan officer	Episode 1.10: "Conflicts of Interest"	
2014	Continuum	Leon Rutledge	Episode 3.7: "Waning Minutes"	
2015	Olympus	Pallas	8 episodes	
2017	When Calls the Heart	Dr. Karl Strohm	Episode 4.11: "Heart of a Fighter"	
2017	Beyond	Gambler Brit		
2018	Altered Carbon	Warden Sullivan	Episode 1.1: "Out of the Past"	
2018	ReBoot: The Guardian Code	Coach Gorley	3 episodes	
2018	The Man in the High Castle	Father Finn	Episode 3.4: "Sabra"	
2018	Garage Sale Mysteries	Ian Hathaway	Episode 14: "Garage Sale Mysteries: Picture a Murder"	
2018–2019	iZombie	Enzo Lambert	16 episodes	
2019	Unspeakable	Sam Millhouse	4 episodes	
2019	Project Blue Book	Phil	Episode 1.6: "The Green Fireballs"	
2019–2020	Batwoman	August Cartwright	7 episodes	
2020–2024	Yellowstone	Ellis Steele	Recurring role beginning in season 3 through final season in 2024. 14 episodes.	
2025	FBI: International	Zaleski	2 episodes in season 4.	
2025	Fire Country	Glenn	One episode in season 3.	
