= Phantom Pain =

Phantom Pain may refer to:

- Phantom pain
- Metal Gear Solid V: The Phantom Pain
- Phantom Pain (film)
- "Phantom Pain", a song by Girl in Red from the album I'm Doing It Again Baby!
- "Phantom Pain" (Yellowstone), 2021 TV episode
