= Neglected (film) =

Film directed by David Lipper

- Theatrical release poster
- Directed by: David Lipper
- Written by: David Lipper; Adam G. Levine
- Story by: Nicholas Ferwerda
- Produced by: David Lipper; Robert A. Daly Jr.; Mark Canton; Dorothy Canton; Ryan Winterstern
- Starring: Josh Duhamel; Dylan Sprouse; Til Schweiger; Elena Sanchez; Jeremy London; Jason London
- Production company: Latigo Films
- Distributed by: Inaugural Entertainment
- Release dates: October 18, 2025 (NBFF); May 8, 2026 (United States)
- Running time: 92 minutes
- Country: United States
- Language: English

Neglected is a 2025 American action thriller film starring Josh Duhamel, Dylan Sprouse, Til Schweiger, Elena Sanchez, Jeremy London, and Jason London. It was directed by David Lipper and written by Lipper and Adam G. Levine, from a story by Nicholas Ferwerda.

It premiered at the Newport Beach Film Festival on October 18, 2025, and had a limited theatrical release in the United States on May 8, 2026.

== Premise ==
A soon-to-be retired detective learns that a serial killer has buried his son alive and must solve a series of murders before the boy runs out of air.

== Cast ==
- Josh Duhamel as Detective Shaw
- Dylan Sprouse as "The Kid"
- Til Schweiger as Capt. Haas
- Elena Sanchez as Detective Keyes
- Jeremy London as Sloan
- Jason London as Deacon

== Production ==
The project was announced in December 2024, when Josh Duhamel, Dylan Sprouse, and Til Schweiger were reported as leading the cast, with Lipper co-writing, directing, and producing the film. BondIt Media Capital financed the film. According to the Toronto Film School, Levine wrote the first draft in 2021 and continued developing the screenplay with Lipper over the following three years.

Principal photography took place in Mississippi in December 2024. The film was shot over 12 days in Clinton, Mississippi.

== Release ==
The film premiered at the 2025 Newport Beach Film Festival under the title The Neglected on October 18. In February 2026, Inaugural Entertainment acquired North American distribution rights to the film, now simply titled Neglected. It had a limited theatrical release in Abu Dhabi in September 2026.
