= Snow Beast =

- Film poster
- Directed by: Brian Brough
- Written by: Brittany Wiscombe
- Produced by: Brian Brough; Anthony Straga; Brittany Wiscombe
- Starring: John Schneider; Jason London; Danielle Chuchran; Paul D. Hunt; Kari Hawker
- Distributed by: Silver Peak Productions
- Release date: October 4, 2011
- Country: United States
- Language: English

Snow Beast is a 2011 horror film directed by Brian Brough. In the film, a research team in the snowy wilds of Canada run afoul of a terrifying Yeti, leaving a father and daughter fighting for survival. It stars John Schneider, Jason London, Danielle Chuchran, Paul D. Hunt, and Kari Hawker.

== Plot ==
A snowboarder at a Canadian ski lodge is enjoying the slopes when he finds himself in an unfamiliar isolated forest area. He attempts to find his way back but is followed and killed by a large beast. A few days later, wildlife researcher Jim Harwood and his resentful daughter Emmy, along with his research team of Rob and Marci, travel to the Canadian ski lodge as part of a study on the annual patterns of the Canadian lynx.

After arriving, Jim, Rob, and Marci find that the lynxes in the area seem to be missing. The trio sets up cameras, and a man stops at a mountain roadside to urinate, and the beast, revealed to be a Yeti, kills him. At the same time, a local ranger, Barry, begins tracking the recent disappearances of tourists in the area, localized around the lodge. As Jim, Rob, and Marci set up their cameras through the woods to capture lynx activity, two other tourists are hiking and killed by the beast.

The following day, Jim, Marci, Rob, and Emmy go into the forest to check the cameras. Near a camera, they encounter huge footprints in the snow. They return to their cabin, but nothing definitive is on the camera footage. That night while asleep in the cabin, a loud growling outside awakens the four. Checking the area in the morning, they find a destroyed snowmobile. Marci reports the attack to the ranger station nearby, and Barry records the incident along with others in the cluster of nearby disappearances. Ranger Gibbons is skeptical of any abnormal beast in the area.

Reviewing some of the remote camera feed footage from the cabin, Rob finds that one of the cameras has gone down. He and Jim leave on the remaining snowmobile to fix it, bringing a tranquilizer gun, while Emmy stays at the cabin and watches the cameras, communicating via walkie-talkies. Around this time, Rangers Barry and Gibbons leave to search the wooded area. While doing so, they are ambushed and killed by the beast. Elsewhere in the forest, Rob works on getting the downed camera up and running again with Emmy's help. He falls into a nearby cavern dug out in the snow, and Jim joins him in the pit, which ends up being a cavern of ice caves. When they find the body of the missing snowboarder, they leave in a panic just before the beast returns to its home. It chases Rob and Jim, but they narrowly escape in the snowmobile.

That night, deducing the beast is a bipedal Yeti-like creature, or a "Snow Beast", Jim decides that they are all leaving the following morning after reporting the snowboarder's body. Marci disagrees and sneaks out in the early morning with the tranquilizer gun and a camera, leaving in Jim's truck. She stops to take some pictures and stumbles upon the beast eating one of its kills. It chases her and smashes her violently into the hood of Jim's truck, killing her and damaging the truck. When the others wake, Jim notices Marci's boots and equipment gone and searches for her by himself. Emmy radios to him when she sees the beast dragging Marci's body through the snow. Jim then encounters the beast himself and is attacked.

Emmy tries to convince Rob to help her search for her father, but night has nearly fallen. The beast attacks the cabin once the sun has set and breaks inside. Rob and Emmy barricade themselves in a bedroom with a dresser while the beast trashes the cabin before finally leaving. In the morning, Emmy manages to convince Rob to help her search for her father as he knows the location of the beast's den. He agrees, and they devise a distraction to lure the beast away. Rob manages to shoot the beast with tranquilizers, which downs him long enough for Rob and Emmy to enter the den. They find Jim barely alive when the beast returns. Rob sacrifices himself, allowing Jim and Emmy to escape and the beast kills him then chases after Jim and Emmy. Jim cannot outrun the beast, so he shoots a flare into the snow-covered mountainside. He and Emmy take cover from the subsequent avalanche behind a thick tree, and the beast is buried in the snow. Jim and Emmy make it out alive and are seen later at home, where they reminisce about how no one will ever believe them.

In a final scene, two hikers are coming up to a large snowdrift, and the beast bursts from the snow and attacks them.

== Cast ==
- John Schneider as Jim Harwood
- Jason London as Ranger Barry
- Danielle Chuchran as Emmy Harwood
- Paul D. Hunt as Rob
- Kari Hawker as Marci
- Gregg Christensen as Snow Beast (in-suit performer)
