= Gil Cates Jr. =

American producer

- Born: October 4, 1969 (age 56); New York City, U.S.
- Occupations: Actor, director, and producer
- Years active: 1980–present
- Children: 2
- Parents: Gilbert Cates; Jane Betty Dubin
- Relatives: Phoebe Cates (cousin)

Gil Cates Jr. (born October 4, 1969) is an American producer, director, and former actor. His 2006 documentary film Life After Tomorrow, which he co-produced and directed with Julie Stevens, won awards for both Best Documentary and Best Director at the Phoenix Film Festival and had its premiere on Showtime. He is the Executive Director / CEO of the Geffen Playhouse in Los Angeles.

== Director ==
Born in New York City, he directed the feature film "The Surface", starring Sean Astin and Chris Mulkey, and co-produced the 2013 film Jobs starring Ashton Kutcher and Josh Gad. In addition, Cates is the director of the 2001 film The Mesmerist starring Neil Patrick Harris and Jessica Capshaw, the 2002 film A Midsummer Night's Rave, the 2006 documentary film Life After Tomorrow, the 2008 film Deal starring Burt Reynolds, the 2009 gambling documentary "Pass the Sugar", and the 2011 film Lucky starring Colin Hanks, Ari Graynor, and Ann-Margret. Cates made his television directorial debut with an episode of the NBC comedy Joey starring Emmy nominee Matt LeBlanc and is currently directing a documentary short chronicling the journey of one of the first refugee families to flee Ukraine and arrive in the US after the Russian invasion.

== Actor ==
Cates' television credits include the 1991 Matlock Season 6 two-part episode The Suspect, the 1992 Major Dad Season 3 episode Three Angry Marines, the 1992 Silk Stalkings Season 1 episode Internal Affair, and the 1993 Doogie Howser, M.D. gay-themed Season 4 episode Spell it M-A-N.

Cates' film credits include parts in the 1992 John Landis film Innocent Blood, the 1997 award-nominated film Lovelife, and the 1999 NetForce.

== Family ==
Cates has two children and resides in Los Angeles. He is the son of Jane Betty Dubin and television producer and film director Gilbert Cates, and is a cousin of the film actress Phoebe Cates.

== Director filmography ==
- The Surface (2014)
- Lucky (2011)
- Pass the Sugar (2009)
- Deal (2008)
- Life After Tomorrow (2006)
- A Midsummer Night's Rave (2002)
- The Mesmerist (2002)
- $pent (2000)
