= A Night of Nightmares =

- Directed by: Buddy Giovinazzo
- Written by: Buddy Giovinazzo; Greg Chandler
- Produced by: Nancy Leopardi
- Starring: Marc Senter; Elissa Dowling; Jason London
- Cinematography: Ulf Soderqvist
- Edited by: Anders Hoffman
- Music by: Susan DiBona
- Production companies: S&B Worldwide
- Release date: 26 July 2012 (Fantasia International Film Festival)
- Running time: 84 minutes
- Country: United States
- Language: English

A Night of Nightmares is a 2012 American horror thriller film directed by Buddy Giovinazzo, starring Marc Senter, Elissa Dowling and Jason London.

== Cast ==
- Marc Senter as Mark Lighthouse
- Elissa Dowling as Ginger
- Jason London as Phil Crater
- Richard Portnow as Cliff Tanner
- Margaux Lancaster as Ruthie Le Mans

== Release ==
The film premiered at the Fantasia International Film Festival on 26 July 2022.

== Reception ==
Chris Bumbray of JoBlo.com rated the film 7 out of 10, calling it a "solid little thriller". Mark L. Miller of Ain't it Cool News wrote a positive review of the film, writing that "It’s extremely effective in amplifying mood and tension, made more so by the lead actors and the director’s patient camera." Michael Gingold of Fangoria wrote a positive review of the film, writing that "The real secret of A Night of Nightmares’ success, though, is its pair of personable, idiosyncratic protagonists. Mark and Ginger are believable both as a potential couple and as they physically struggle with, and try to think their way out of, their horrific situation, and the fact that we want them to get together even before the haunting starts makes us want that much more for them to overcome it." Film critic Anton Bitel wrote a positive review of the film, calling it "One of the most creepily charming horror films of the last decade".
