= The Surface (film) =

- Theatrical release poster
- Directed by: Gil Cates Jr.
- Written by: Jeff Gendelman
- Produced by: Jeff Gendelman; Jimmy Sammarco
- Starring: Sean Astin; Mimi Rogers; Chris Mulkey; Jeff Gendelman
- Cinematography: Jimmy Sammarco
- Edited by: Sherwood Jones
- Music by: Jeff Russo
- Production company: Good Note Productions
- Distributed by: Entertainment One
- Release dates: October 9, 2014 (Milwaukee Film Festival); May 15, 2015 (Blu-ray/DVD premiere)
- Running time: 90 minutes
- Country: United States
- Language: English

The Surface is a 2014 American drama thriller film directed by Gil Cates Jr. and starring Sean Astin, Mimi Rogers, Chris Mulkey, and Jeff Gendelman. Gendelman was also the writer and producer.

== Plot ==
Mitch takes his late father’s boat out to the center of Lake Michigan for a final ride in his memory, but collides with the wreckage of a small plane in the water. Kelly, the pilot who survived the crash but severely injured, is pulled onto Mitch’s boat for rescue. But the debris of the wreckage had knocked the propeller off the boat’s motor, leaving both men stranded in the middle of the vast lake.

== Cast ==
- Sean Astin as Mitch
- Mimi Rogers as Kim
- Chris Mulkey as Kelly
- Jeff Gendelman as John
- Rachel Renee as Laurie
- Neil Willenson as Nelson, Fox TV cameraman.
- Sam Fuhrer as The Waterskier
- John Emmet Tracy as Bank Manager
- Elvis Thao as Factory Worker
- Deleono Johnson as Factory Worker
- David John Rosenthal as Fisherman
- Dylan Simon as Cheering Fan
- Veronica Handeland as Bowling Alley Patron (uncredited)

== Production ==
On July 22, 2013 Sean Astin and Mimi Rogers joined the cast of the film, Gil Cates Jr. is directing the film and Jeff Gendelman wrote the script for thriller film. Mimi Rogers also joined the cast on 7 August in the Good Notes Productions financing film.

=== Filming ===
Shooting began on August 10, 2013 in Milwaukee, Wisconsin.
