= Meridian: Kiss of the Beast =

1990 film by Charles Band

Meridian: Kiss Of The Beast
- Directed by: Charles Band
- Screenplay by: Dennis Paoli
- Story by: Charles Band
- Produced by: Charles Band; Debra Dion
- Starring: Sherilyn Fenn; Malcolm Jamieson; Charlie Spradling; Hilary Mason
- Cinematography: Mac Ahlberg
- Edited by: Ted Nicolaou
- Music by: Pino Donaggio
- Distributed by: Full Moon Features
- Release date: April 13, 1990
- Running time: 85 mins
- Country: United States
- Languages: English; Italian

Meridian, also known as Meridian: Kiss of the Beast, The Ravaging and Phantoms, is a 1990 American romantic horror film produced and directed by Charles Band and starring Sherilyn Fenn, Malcolm Jamieson, Hilary Mason and Charlie Spradling.

== Plot ==
The film follows Catherine, a wealthy heiress who has returned to her family castle in Italy after her father's death. Along for the trip is her adventurous best friend Gina, who is eager to tour the surrounding lands. The two decide to visit a local carnival, where Gina becomes infatuated with its leader, Lawrence, and invites both him and his troupe to dinner at the castle. His troupe proves to be an unruly lot, which gives Lawrence the opportunity to drug both women. He takes Catherine to another room, where he begins to seduce her but pulls away so his twin brother Oliver can instead have sex with her. Lawrence returns to the dining hall and rapes Gina.

The following morning leaves both women confused, as neither can fully remember the prior night. Gina develops an interest in the legends surrounding the castle while Catherine starts a tenuous romance with Oliver. Catherine learns that both brothers are long-lived magicians. They can only die at the hands of a loved one. Oliver has also been bespelled by Lawrence to turn into a beast whenever he has sex. He further reveals that Lawrence will torture him by allowing him to fall in love with women, only to murder them before Oliver can achieve either true happiness or death.

The film culminates in a battle between the two brothers, ending in Oliver killing Lawrence in order to save Catherine. The curse finally broken, Oliver begins to leave as he and the troupe came through a magical gate. Catherine chooses to remain by his side, leaving the human world behind.

== Cast ==
- Sherilyn Fenn as Catherine Bomarzini
- Malcolm Jamieson as Lawrence / Oliver
- Hilary Mason as Martha
- Charlie Spradling as Gina
- Alex Daniels as The Beast
- Phil Fondacaro as Circus Dwarf
- Vernon Dobtcheff as Village Priest
- Isabella Celani as Castle Ghost

== Production ==
Meridian had a budget of less than $2 million dollars and filming took place at the Castello di Giovi outside Rome. Band has stated that he found the movie's "erotic love story" appealing and that although it did have a theme of "Beauty and the Beast", this was not intentionally done. The costume for the film's beast was made of human hair, which Band stated was done because it looked better on film.

== Release ==
Meridian was released to video in the United States on April 13, 1990. It has received several DVD releases and in 2016 Full Moon released a re-mastered version of the film.

The film's soundtrack was released in 1992 through Moonstone Records. Allmusic gave the soundtrack two stars, as they felt that it was not among Pino Donaggio's best work.

== Reception ==
Matt Serafini heavily criticized the film in a 2010 review for Dread Central, commenting that while he had previously listed the movie as one of his favorites, Meridian did not hold up under further viewings, as it was "as poorly written and sloppily made as anything in their recent output". Bryan Senn also criticized the film in his book The Werewolf Filmography, negatively referencing the pacing and acting. Hal Erickson of Allmovie panned the film, giving it 1 and 1/2 stars.

Julian White reviewed the 2016 release for Starbust, noting that although the film had its flaws, "it also has considerable allure and, for most of the time, casts quite a spell."
