= Angel of Destruction =

- DVD cover
- Directed by: Charles Philip Moore
- Written by: Paul Maslak (story); Charles Philip Moore
- Produced by: Roger Corman (executive producer); Mike Elliott (executive producer); Rob Kerchner (associate producer); Christopher R. Santiago (associate producer); Cirio H. Santiago (producer)
- Starring: Maria Ford; Charlie Spradling; Jessica Mark; Antonio Bacci
- Cinematography: Joe Batac
- Edited by: Brian Katkin, Terry Kelley
- Music by: Terry Plumeri
- Production company: Concorde-New Horizons
- Release date: June 22, 1994
- Running time: 86 minutes
- Country: United States
- Language: English

Angel of Destruction is a 1994 film directed by Charles Philip Moore and starring Maria Ford, and Charlie Spradling. The film, produced and distributed by Concorde-New Horizons, was a Roger Corman production.

== Plot ==
A controversial rock star Delilah, is hoping her upcoming album will give her success after the two previous albums failed. After a topless cabaret/glam-metal performance at a local S&M club, she finds a finger with a ring in a box left for her within the dressing room. The sender is a psychotic fan Robert Kell, a sexual predator/mercenary/ex-military man in town, who has returned to the area to seek revenge on various underworld mobsters who "left his men to die in Angola", during the Angolan War of Independence.

This situation leads Delilah, and her lover/co-conspirator Reena, to seek a female bodyguard for protection. She has a dislike of the police, as her father was a cop, and he had once raped her. They seek undercover cop Brit Alwood, who agrees to take the case. However moments after the pair leaving Alwood's office, Brit is killed by Kell.

When Brit's kid sister Jo finds out about the crime, she sets out for revenge and agrees to protect Delilah, assisted by her lover Aaron Sayles, who is a detective. Jo is pulled into the dark, erotic world of sex, drugs, and rock-n-roll, and is forced to confront the crazed mind of a vicious serial killer. The two scour the town, interrogating Vietnam veterans that might know Kell's whereabouts.

At the same time Danny Marcus, Delilah's manager and abusive lover, starts causing problems for the talent when her record label owner Sonny Luso wants her to change her bad girl image. Sonny stands to lose $2 million if she won't change her image and the new album fails. He could collect $1.5 million on an insurance policy if she winds up dead – which leads to an assassination attempt that is thwarted by both Jo and Kell, who she believes is trying to save Delilah for a sick and twisted fantasy finale.

== Cast ==
- Maria Ford as Jo Alwood
- Charlie Spradling as Brit Alwood
- Jessica Mark as Delilah
- Antonio Bacci as Aaron Sayles
- Chanda as Reena Jacobs
- Jimmy Broome as Robert Kell
- Bob McFarland as Sonny Luso
- Chuck Moore as Chet Wailner
- Timothy D. Baker as Tony
- James Gregory Paolleli as Danny Marcus
- Jim Moss as Sergeant Rooney
- Steve Nicholson as Dino
- Mark Duffy as Rodman
- Henry Strzalkowski as Louis
- Zenaida Amador as Mrs. Kona
- Paul Holmes as Coroner
- John Kater as Carl Wells

== Background ==
The film is a remake of the 1992 action film Blackbelt, starring Don 'The Dragon' Wilson, which had involved the same writers and producers as Angel of Destruction, as well as also being directed by Moore, and produced by Corman. The roles were changed however, with a martial arts expert being replaced with a female undercover cop instead. The actor Bob McFarland appeared as different characters in both films. Three of the film's major actors Jessica Mark, Antonio Bacci and Jimmy Broome, have never appeared in any other films before or after Angel of Destruction. Although set in Hawaii, the film was actually filmed in the Philippines. Although the film is mainly known for its title Angel of Destruction, it has also been named Furious Angel.

Concorde-New Horizons originally gave the film its small theatrical release in 1994. New Horizons Home Video issued the first VHS release on April 7, 1998, in America. On May 25, 2004, the film was given its first DVD release by New Concorde Home Entertainment. This was issued as part of "The Maria Ford Collection". The film's tagline reads "So hot she'll knock you out cold."

In 1998 the film was one subject of the documentary The Dark Side of Hollywood, which looked behind the scenes of Hollywood's low-budget movie industry, and featured clips and discussion on Angel of Destruction.

== Reception ==
Hal Erickson of Allmovie gave the film one and a half stars. He stated, "Angel of Destruction" stars female martial-arts expert Maria Ford in the title role. In the tradition of the "B" westerns of Yore, Ford sets out to avenge her sister's murderer. She's essentially a woman of peace, though she leaves a lot of her opponents in pieces. There's gore galore before she corners the killers, and it is for this reason, rather than the frequent glimpses of the leading lady's bare torso, that the film is rated R. The saving grace of "Angel of Destruction", for non-chopsocky fans, is the fact that Maria Ford actually has a soupcon of acting ability."

Entertainment Weekly writer Glenn Kenny, gave the film a C− grade in a review published on June 17, 1994. He stated, "In "Angel of Destruction", direct-to-video sexpot Maria Ford swipes a leaf from Cynthia Rothrock's book and goes martial arts. Ford's twist? She occasionally kicks butt whilst half-naked. Mere words cannot do justice to the ludicrousness of Angel's plot, which commences with Ford deciding to avenge the murder of her sister and climaxes when she's forced to do a striptease act at the behest of a psychotic ex-mercenary. You've got to sit through it to not believe it."

In the book The Motion Picture Guide 1995 Annual: The Films of 1994, written by James Pallot and published by CineBooks, it was noted that, "all the elements of "Angel of Destruction" are so familiar that it's easy to think you've already seen it." The 2006 book VideoHound's Golden Movie Retriever, by Jim Craddock, gave the film one and a half stars. The Video Source Book of 2008, written by James M. Craddock and published by Thomson Gale, also gave the same rating.
