= Sofia Karstens =

Canadian television and film actress

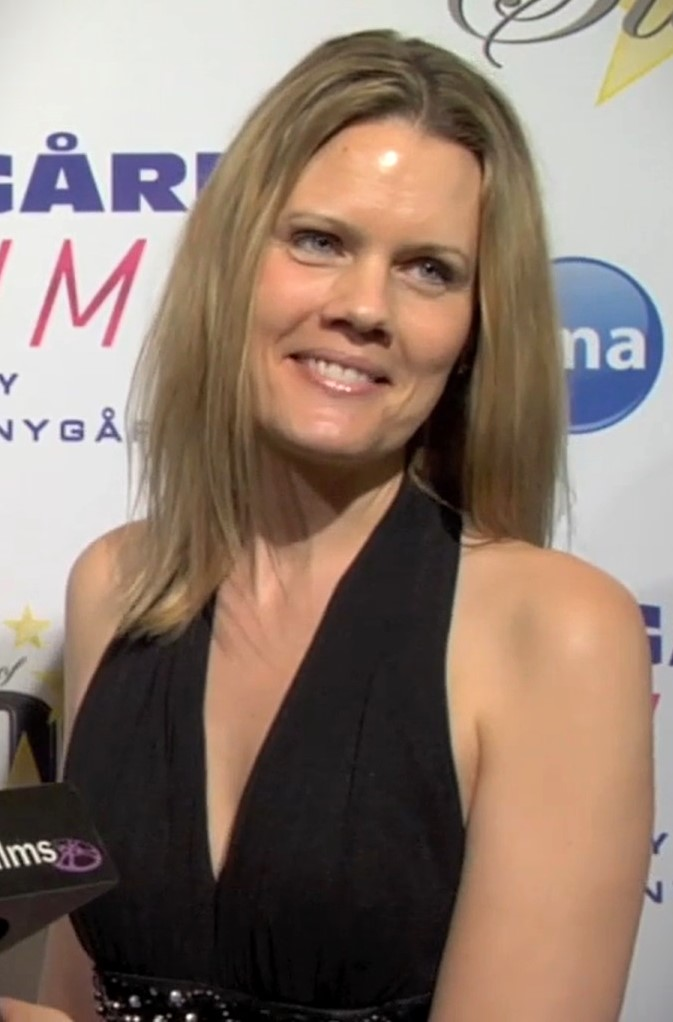
- Karstens in 2015
- Born: Sofia Jeanne Karstens; Montreal, Quebec, Canada
- Citizenship: Canada, United States
- Education: NYU Tisch School of the Arts
- Occupation: Actress
- Years active: 1998–present
- Known for: Lovelace
- Spouse: Jason London (m. 2011)

Sofia Jeanne Karstens is a Canadian television and film actress who is known for her work in Lovelace, The Greatest Script Ever Written and Bad Blood. Karstens acted on television before moving to more film projects.

== Personal life ==
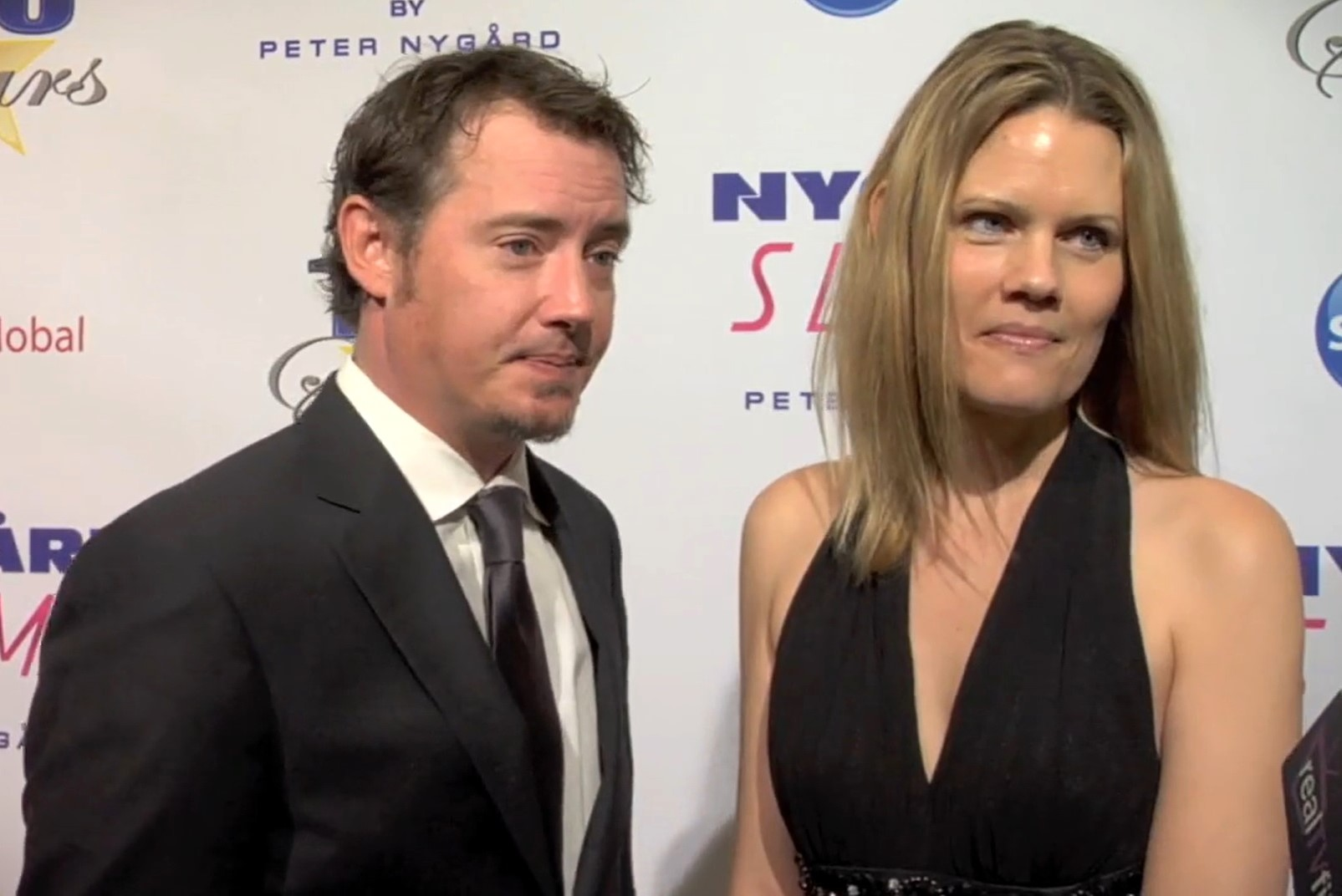
Jason London, Sofia Karstens at Night of 100 Stars 2015

On July 16, 2011, Karstens married actor Jason London. They had met through London's brother, Jeremy, who attended the ceremony at the Karstens family home in North Hero, Vermont. After the marriage ceremony, Karstens and London resettled in Los Angeles to resume their acting careers. The ring that London proposed with had been Karstens' grandmother's ring.

== Filmography ==
Year	Project	Role	Notes
1998	The Census Taker	Mary	Short film
1999	Sunset Beach	Beautiful girl	2 episodes
2000	The Beach Boys: An American Family	Female Dancer	
2000	Coyote Ugly	Dancer #4	(uncredited)
2000	JAG	Misty James	1 episode: "JAG TV"
2004	Skin Trade	The Makeup Artist	
2004	The Bold and the Beautiful	Sophia/Forrester Model	5 episodes
2005	Medium	Rene	1 episode: "Suspicions and Certainties"
2005	Greener Mountains	Beckwith	
2006	Hookers Inc.	Stripper	
2007	The Death and Life of Bobby Z	Party Girl #2	(uncredited)
2009	Chrome Angels	Suzy	
2010	Psych	Katie Farr	1 episode: "The Polarizing Express"
2011	Shooting for Tomorrow	Faye Dunaway	
2011	The Chicago 8	Yippie Girl	
2011	Hollywood & Wine	Alice	
2011	Shooting for Something Else	Lily	Short film
2011	The Greatest Script Ever Written	Actress on TV	Short film
2011	Tomorrow's End	Faye	
2012	Bad Blood	Diana	
2013	Lovelace	Piano Singer	
2014	Crimes of the Mind	Defense Attorney Tess Roberts	
2014	The Nurse	Rena	
