= The Martini Shot =

- Directed by: Stephen Wallis
- Written by: Stephen Wallis
- Produced by: Stephen Wallis; Emma Owen; Angelo Paletta; Susan Ilot; Michael Godfrey; Russ De Jong; Chris Marchese (associate)
- Starring: Matthew Modine; Stuart Townsend; Fiona Glascott; Morgana Robinson; Jason London; John Cleese; Derek Jacobi
- Cinematography: Russ De Jong
- Edited by: Russ De Jong
- Music by: Alain Mayrand
- Production company: Babyjane Productions
- Distributed by: Trinity Creative Partnership
- Release date: July 13, 2023 (Galway Film Fleadh)
- Running time: 90 minutes
- Countries: Ireland; Canada
- Language: English

The Martini Shot is a 2023 drama film written and directed by Stephen Wallis and starring Matthew Modine, Stuart Townsend, Fiona Glascott, Morgana Robinson, Jason London, John Cleese and Derek Jacobi.

== Plot ==
An ailing movie director begins to shoot what he believes to be his final work of art. What starts out as a normal movie, ends up being an exploration of mortality and one's profound effect on the world.

== Cast ==
- Matthew Modine as Steve
- Fiona Glascott as Mary
- Stuart Townsend as Philip
- John Cleese as Dr. Auyeung
- Derek Jacobi as Errol
- Jason London as Chet
- Morgana Robinson as Dr. Ehm
- Catriona Loughlin as Shannon
- Cat Hostick as Rose
- Malcolm Danare as Eddie
- Chris Marchese as Jack

== Production ==
The film was shot in Ireland before the COVID-19 pandemic and produced by Stephen Wallis, Emma Owen, Angelo Paletta, Susan Ilot, Michael Godfrey, Russ De Jong; with Chris Marchese as associate producer.

== Release ==
The film premiered at the Galway Film Fleadh on July 13, 2023.

== Reception ==
Davide Abbatescianni of Cineuropa gave the film a positive review and wrote, “These days, it’s extremely rare to find such a small film with such a big heart. With tact, creativity and simplicity, Stephen Wallis has crafted a beautiful picture about life, death, love and art…”

Nikki Baughan of Screen International gave the film a negative review, calling it “…an infuriatingly opaque, unrelentingly pretentious narrative…”

== Accolades ==
The Martini Shot received over 60 award wins at film festivals worldwide.

Selected awards and nominations
Film festival	Year	Award	Recipient	Result
Santa Fe Film Festival	2024	Best Feature Film	The Martini Shot	Won
Santa Fe Film Festival	2024	Best Actor	Matthew Modine	Won
Garden State Film Festival	2024	Best Feature Film	The Martini Shot	Won
Toronto Independent Film Festival	2024	Best Feature Film	The Martini Shot	Won
Toronto Independent Film Festival	2024	Best Actor	Matthew Modine	Won
Gasparilla International Film Festival	2024	Best Female Performance	Fiona Glascott	Won
Red Dirt International Film Festival	2024	Best Director	Stephen Wallis	Won

== See also ==
- Galway Film Fleadh
