= A Midsummer Night's Rave =

2002 American film by Gil Cates Jr.

- Official film poster
- Directed by: Gil Cates Jr.
- Written by: Rober Raymond
- Produced by: Summer Forest Hoeckel; Leslie Bates; Steve Eggleston
- Starring: Corey Pearson; Lauren German; Andrew Keegan; Chad Lindberg; Sunny Mabrey
- Cinematography: Tom Harting
- Edited by: Jonathan Cates
- Music by: Peter Rafelson
- Distributed by: Velocity Home Entertainment
- Release date: November 1, 2002
- Running time: 85 minutes
- Language: English
- Budget: $1.5 million

A Midsummer Night's Rave is a 2002 American film adapted from Shakespeare's A Midsummer Night's Dream released on November 1, 2002. The film stars Corey Pearson, Lauren German, Andrew Keegan, Chad Lindberg, and Sunny Mabrey; and was directed by Gil Cates Jr. It is set at a rave, rather than the forest where most of the original is set. The film received little attention from professional movie critics, but is considered a success with teen audiences, and has been used as an exemplar for a category of movies (the "McShakespeare", an example of McDonaldization) in more academic publications.

== Plot and setting ==
A Midsummer Night's Rave transposes A Midsummer Night's Dream to modern rave culture. Unlike Rave Macbeth—released a year earlier and also adapting a Shakespeare play, Macbeth, into the context of rave culture—A Midsummer Night's Rave's plot also explores the characters' activities outside of the rave: Xander (Andrew Keegan) and Mia (Sunny Mabrey) needs the aid of a rave and a green glowing drug, provided by a British mystic, O. B. John (Jason Carter), to admit their love for each other; a drug dealer, apparently modelled on Shylock, named Doc wants his stolen drug money; and Nick (Chad Lindberg) dons a donkey costume at a daycare center. The plot is significantly altered from the original to "accommodate a homosexual relationship and to allow one liberated woman, Elena (Lauren German), to reject her callow lover."

== Reception ==
Among the few professional reviews is Joe Leydon's for Variety in 2003. The review is generally negative, but highlights some actor performances and the directorial choice to omit the original Shakespearean dialog. Overall he thinks it "... plays less like witty romantic comedy than a watered-down (and dumbed-down) version of ...Go. [The director] goes for cheap laughs by encouraging actors to chew on the scenery—and each other—without worrying about such niceties as narrative logic and character consistency." His summary of its viability as a film is that "[it] isn't likely to be a fave-rave with critics or auds." Mark Jenkins, in a review for the Washington City Paper, sums it up as: "Although rendered in suitably neon hues, the movie is not a visual triumph; its low-budget seams show, and an attempt at a Trainspotting-like aside is weak. The film's principal virtues are its attractive cast, sprightly pace, thumping soundtrack, and happy-face take on young romance. The love drug is not required for viewing, but any cynics in the audience will probably wish they had taken something."

A more positive take appears in the book Visual Media for Teens (2009), which in its chapter on "'Issues of Identity' Films" recommends A Midsummer Night's Rave with the description "This film really manages to stick close to the original story in a delightful retelling of a classic play that appeals to teens." R. S. White, however, in Shakespeare's Cinema of Love: A Study in Genre and Influence (2016), describes it by saying that "... [the] farcical A Midsummer Night's Rave (2002), [is] a conscious pastiche of Shakespeare's play, [and] shows the irrational events being caused by consciousness-altering drugs and the air of psychedelic fantasy created by a musical rave party." Similarly, Joss Whedon as Shakespearean Moralist: Narrative Ethics of the Bard and the Buffyverse (2014) lists it among the films it considers "a hit with the teens" in a chapter exploring films that employ allusions to and loose adaptations of Shakespeare, as distinct from the more strict adaptations of Orson Welles, Laurence Olivier, and Franco Zeffirelli. In an article for Tor.com, Leah Schnelbach and Natalie Zutter lists it as among "Shakespeare Adaptations That Best Speak to Teens", and concludes: "If any of you want to revisit a certain ~~best night of your life~~ subset of 1990s culture, this is your Shakespeare adaptation." In 2016, Kristen Stegemoeller, writing for Paper, listed it as number 8 in a list of "Shakespeare's Teen Movies" based solely on a plot description found on Wikipedia. And in a 2015 article "In Defense of Go As A Rave Movie" (referring to Go (1999)), Genna Rivieccio describes A Midsummer Night's Rave as among the "classics" of rave movies.

== A Midsummer Night's Rave and the "McShakespeare" ==
A "McMovie"—the application of McDonaldization to movies—is, according to Greenberg, characterised by "[dogged] imitation and allusion rather than experimentation, even within narrow genre confines[.] ... Uninspiring prototypes [that] have spun off sequels, which have birthed still drearier successors—a Barthesian chain of replication unfolding into ever-declining signification." Jess-Cooke adds that "[the] McMovie fundamentally draws attention to the ideological assertions and determining factors of a fast-food chain of film production. ... film rip-offs that champion loose endings, weak, cartoonish characters, inconsistent screenplays, stale narratives, fast pacing, loud music and soundbite dialogue ...".

Analogous to this, Jess-Cooke creates the concept of the McShakespeare as a commodification of Shakespeare adaptations.

In the McShakespeare, the Bard is used—like the golden arches [of the McDonald's logo]—to localise cultural concerns within a global economy and, conversely, to signify the global within the local. The tension between the local and global is at the heart of the McShakespeare, largely in terms of the use of the plays to articulate experiences of displacement and to re-work social rituals, indigenous identities, traditions, languages and cultural codes for popular consumption. ... [The] McShakespeare suggests contemporary Shakespeare appropriation as a signifying practice instead of a point of textual origin[:] ... Shakespeare serves less as an originating text or a cultural icon than as product placement, a secondary position of intertextual engagement that classifies, or legitimates, the often blatant registers of a McDonald's ideology.

In that context she assesses A Midsummer Night's Rave. She finds that it "[acknowledges] Shakespearean cinema's main audience as teenage" by adapting Shakespeare's play as explicitly "youth culture". As an example she points out that its entire cast is composed of actors that have played in popular teen movies like The Fast and the Furious, American Pie, and 10 Things I Hate About You; and includes a part for pop-culture icon Carrie Fisher that "subtly conjures" Princess Leia. She describes its plot as "loose" and "weaves together strands from a variety of Shakespeare's plays", and that it is neither narrative-driven nor ideologically subversive. However, she does find in it an effort to recontextualise Shakespeare away from a "high school" and academic setting, and into a more "in culture" and "anti-authoritarian" one.

== Cast ==
- Corey Pearson—Damon (Demetrius)
- Lauren German—Elena (Helena)
- Andrew Keegan—Xander (Lysander)
- Chad Lindberg—Nick (Nick Bottom)
- Sunny Mabrey—Mia (Hermia)
- Jason Carter—OB John (Oberon)
- Nichole Hiltz—Britt (Titania)
- Glen Badyna—Puck (Puck)
- Olivia Rosewood—Tami (Snug)
- Chris Owen—Frankie (Peter Quince)
- Will McCormack—Greg (Francis Flute)
- Greg Zola—Snout (Tom Snout)
- Keri Lynn Pratt—Debbie (Robin Starveling)
- Jamie Anderson—Amanda
- Jennifer Crystal Foley—Lily
- Jolie Summers—Rose
- Jennifer Foy—Violet
- Sara Arrington—TP Fairy
- Terry Scannell—Doc
- Jennifer Rebecca Bailey—Jennifer
- Dinah Lee—Jessica
- Sean Whalen—Gil
- Jason London—Stosh
- Charlie Spradling—Stosh's Babe
- Matt Czuchry—Evan

== Sources ==
- Halsall, Jane; Edminster, R. William; Nichols, C. Allen, eds. (2009). ""Issues of Identity" Films". Visual Media for Teens: Creating and Using a Teen-Centered Film Collection. Libraries Unlimited Professional Guides for Young Adult Librarians. ABC-CLIO. pp. 39–52. ISBN 978-0-313-39128-6.
- Jess-Cooke, Carolyn (2006). "Screening the McShakespeare in Post-Millennial Cinema". In Burnett, Mark Thornton; Wray, Ramona (eds.). Screening Shakespeare in the Twenty-First Century. Edinburgh: Edinburgh University Press. pp. 163–84. ISBN 978-0-7486-3008-0.
- Jenkins, Mark (July 30, 2004). "A Midsummer Night's Rave". Washington Citypaper.
- Lanier, Douglas (2006a). ""That You Have but Slumbered Here": A Midsummer Night's Dream in Popular Culture". In Bourus, Terri; Holland, Peter (eds.). A Midsummer Night's Dream. Shakespeare Sourcebooks. Sourcebooks. pp. 23–36. ISBN 978-1-4022-2680-9.
- Leydon, Joe (April 29, 2003). "Review: A Midsummer Night's Rave". Variety.
- Rabb, J. Douglas; Richardson, J. Michael (2014). "Shakespeare and Popular Culture: Uses and Echoes of the Bard in the Whedonverses and Ours as Well". Joss Whedon as Shakespearean Moralist: Narrative Ethics of the Bard and the Buffyverse. McFarland. pp. 83–101. ISBN 978-0-7864-7440-0.
- Rivieccio, Genna (February 24, 2015). "In Defense of Go As A Rave Movie". Culledculture.com.
- Schnelbach, Leah; Zutter, Natalie (January 1, 2016). "Shakespeare Adaptations That Best Speak to Teens". Tor.com.
- Stegemoeller, Kristen (April 23, 2016). "Shakespeare's Teen Movies: Ranked". Paper.
- White, R. S. (2016). "Dreams in the forest: romantic comedy". Shakespeare's Cinema of Love: A Study in Genre and Influence. Oxford: Oxford University Press. pp. 71–108. ISBN 978-1-5261-0782-4.
