= Billy Klapper =

American craftsman (1937–2024)

Billy Ray Klapper
- Born: April 19, 1937; Lazare, Texas, United States
- Died: September 10, 2024 (aged 87); Pampa, Texas, United States
- Occupations: Bit maker, Spur maker
- Television: Yellowstone (American TV series)

Billy Ray Klapper (April 19, 1937 – September 10, 2024) was a spur and bit maker known for creating and producing many unique spurs and bits for the ranching community.

== Early life and career ==
Klapper began his career as a ranch hand at the Buckle L Ranch in Childress, Texas and later at the Y Ranch in Paducah, Texas, and transitioned to spur and a bit making in 1966 under the mentorship of Adolph Bayers, where he observed and learned the craft.By 1968, the demand for his work had grown significantly, leading him to pursue making cowboy equipment full-time. During his career, Klapper developed 682 spur patterns and 816 bit patterns.

== Craftsmanship and technique ==
At age 25, Klapper built his first bit while working on the Y Ranch. The long wait times for custom-made equipment from established craftsmen such as his future mentor, Adolph Bayers, inspired Klapper to start making bits.

In 1968, Klapper became a full-time bit and spur maker due to the high demand for his work. He started his business near Childress, Texas, before eventually relocating to Pampa, Texas.

Klapper was known for one-piece spurs built using a technique that set him apart in the industry. He was one of the few craftsmen who made spurs from a single piece of steel rather than welding pieces together. His dedication to traditional methods limited his production to approximately 200 spurs annually. His crafts were known for durability and suitability for working cowboys while having high collectible value; his spurs or bits cost as much as $2,100. While apprenticing, Klapper adopted Bayers’ blacksmithing techniques, including hammering out one piece of steel without welding, using pre-1949 Ford axles as raw material for spurs (though this became harder to source over time), and employing a trip hammer to shape the steel.

== Notable designs ==
- The “27” bit: One of Klapper’s most popular designs, featuring snake-like curved shanks and a solid, high-ported mouthpiece
- The “299” bit: A lighter version of the “27” created for horseman Don Dodge

== Notable clientele ==
- Matlock Rose (NCHA World Champion)
- Shannon Hall (cutting horse trainer)
- Carol Rose (AQHA Hall of Fame breeder)
- Charles III

== Yellowstone appearance ==
In his cameo on Yellowstone, Klapper played himself, appearing in a scene with the character Rip Wheeler (Cole Hauser). The scene takes place in Klapper's workshop in Pampa, Texas, where Rip goes to pick up a bit ordered by Lloyd years ago.

Klapper's craftsmanship is highlighted during this interaction, and he gives Rip a pair of his handmade spurs. This moment is meant to serve as the passing of the torch from the old generation of cowboys to the new.

The episode ends with a tribute to Klapper, reading "In Loving Memory of Billy Klapper," honoring his contribution to Western heritage and his brief but impactful appearance on the show.
