= Broken Vessels =

- Film poster
- Directed by: Scott Ziehl
- Written by: Scott Ziehl; David Baer; John McMahon
- Produced by: Scott Ziehl; Roxana Zal
- Starring: Todd Field; Jason London; Roxana Zal; Susan Traylor; James Hong
- Cinematography: Antonio Calvache
- Edited by: Chris Figler; David Moritz
- Music by: Martin Blasick; Todd Field; Brent David Fraser; Bill Laswell
- Distributed by: Unapix Entertainment Productions
- Release date: July 2, 1999
- Running time: 90 minutes
- Country: United States
- Language: English
- Budget: $600,000
- Box office: $13,493

Broken Vessels is a 1999 medical drama film directed by Scott Ziehl and written by Ziehl along with David Baer and John McMahon. The film debuted at the Los Angeles Independent Film Festival and marked Ziehl's directorial debut. It stars Todd Field, Jason London, Roxana Zal, Susan Traylor, and James Hong. The film follows a rookie paramedic and his hardened drug-addicted partner as they take calls and cruise L.A. in their ambulance. Although it shares the same name as the book, it has nothing to do with the Andre Dubus essay collection of the same name.

== Plot ==
Pennsylvania transplant Tom Meyer begins working as an EMT in Los Angeles. He is paired with utterly self-assured veteran Jimmy Warzniak, who has apparently gone through many partners in his time. As a rookie, Tom is initially overwhelmed and impressed by Jimmy's competence to deal with the high-pressure job. However, Jimmy's drinking and drug usage unnerves Tom (including smoking heroin while on duty), but he enjoys partying with Jimmy and his girlfriends. Jimmy also regularly stops by a nursing home to administer heroin fixes to his grandfather. When Tom is partying with Jimmy and his neighbor Susy, he also starts smoking heroin and drinking. When Tom's roommate kicks him out due to his drug use and negligence, he moves in with Jimmy, which exacerbates his drug usage.

Jimmy's behavior becomes more morally reprehensible, and eventually Tom's does as well. Tom is particularly upset when Jimmy robs an elderly couple whom they were administering aid to. He is further shaken when Jimmy forces them to leave a drug house they were occupying, instead of administering aid to an addict having a medical emergency (as they cannot explain to their boss both being there, and intoxicated, before the 911 call went out). Meanwhile, Tom is repeatedly haunted by flashbacks appearing to be of a car crash while he was drunk driving.

When grandpa dies, Jimmy starts shooting heroin, which upsets Tom further. Tom and Jimmy spiral out in to addiction, and soon spend all of their time using drugs. Tom tries to reconnect with Elizabeth (a brief roommate of Susy's whom he dated), but she's disturbed by his condition and advises him to seek help, which he refuses. Having run out of money, the two agree to sell methamphetamine made by Susy's friend Jed, but sell a large amount for only $100 to buy more heroin. The two get caught and shot at while trying to rip off their dealer, leading to a crash. Tom survives, but Jimmy is killed, and their theft and drug use are discovered by police responders to the scene.

While in police custody, it's revealed that Tom was the drunk driver in a crash with an Amish buggy back in Pennsylvania that killed a 10-year old girl, but charges were dropped when the family refused to testify. Tom's lawyer produces a videotape (that was recorded by Jimmy earlier in the film) that shows LAPD police beating a couple of men at a wedding, implying that they drop the charges in exchange for keeping the tape buried. In the end, Tom says that while he could blame Jimmy for corrupting him, he admits that his addiction problems were his own fault before he met Jimmy, and that he had to stop running away from his past.

== Cast ==
- Todd Field as Jimmy Warzniak
- Jason London as Tom Meyer
- Roxana Zal as Elizabeth Capalino
- Susan Traylor as Susy
- James Hong as Mr. Chen
- Patrick Cranshaw as Gramps
- Brent David Fraser as Jed
- Stephanie Feury as Jill
- Al Israel as Detective McMahon

== Box office ==
Made on a non-union shoestring budget of $600,000, it was nominated for several awards when it was shown at film festivals in 1998. Though it failed to find a legitimate theatrical distributor, eventually, the film was self-released in just two theaters over the holiday weekend of July 4, 1999 and brought in $3,722.

== Critical reception ==
Roger Ebert of the Chicago Sun-Times gave it three stars out of four, saying "What makes the movie special is the way both lead actors find the right quiet notes for their performances."

Leonard Klady of Variety wrote

"A vivid, embracing tale of life on the edge, Broken Vessels is an assured first feature with potent commercial appeal. Focused on a pair of paramedics behind the wheel of an ambulance, the film skillfully careens through the incidental and dark humor of their lives and plows forward into the bleak personal terrain that comes with the job. One of the few genuine artistic hits of the L.A. Indie Fest (the film received the fest's best picture prize), Vessels has sufficient high- octane quality to overcome the noisy, overcrowded specialized scene and carve out a respectable theatrical niche. At the center of Broken Vessels are two exceptionally compelling performances by Field and London. Despite the outward flashiness of Jimmy, Field does nothing to pump up his role; it's wonderfully nuanced work in which the most modest changes in shading wind up resonating as his dance on the edge of sanity and the law becomes complex and precarious. London works his boyish persona for all its worth and his slide from cute to sinister occurs with brilliant ease."

Kevin Thomas of the Los Angeles Times wrote

"Movies don't get much more corrosive or gripping than Scott Ziehl's high-energy first feature, Broken Vessels. The actors, including the ever-reliable William Smith in a cameo, are all on the money in their portrayals in exceptionally well-drawn roles, crackling with pungent dialogue. In major, demanding roles London and Field are especially impressive. Broken Vessels could take Ziehl far. It has that kind of kinetic energy that fuses style and theme, as Tom and Jimmy careen through L.A. streets both in answer to emergency calls and in pursuit of a fix."

== Awards and nominations ==
At the British Independent Film Awards, the film was nominated for Best Foreign Independent Film - English Language, at the Gijón International Film Festival director Scott Ziehl was nominated for the Grand Prix Asturias award in the category of Best Feature. Ziehl and co-producer Roxana Zal won the Audience Award in the category of Best Feature Film at the Los Angeles Independent Film Festival in 1998.
