= Transforming Stories International Christian Film Festival =

Christian film festival

- Location: South Africa
- Founded: 2010
- Awards: Best Feature Film; Best Documentary Film; Best Short Film
- Hosted by: Humble Pie Entertainment
- Language: English
- Website: http://www.transformingstories.org/2011/

Transforming Stories International Christian Film Festival (TSICFF) is an annual Christian film industry film festival held in South Africa. The festival is funded by Humble Pie Entertainment. In 2010, the festival's inaugural year, the award ceremony took place in Johannesburg, South Africa. Screenings took place in five different cities across the country. 18 countries submitted a total of 108 films, 12 of which were chosen as semi-finalists from which 5 became finalists. Awards were presented for Best Feature Film, Best Documentary Film, and Best Short Film. Greg Laurie's Lost Boy: The Next Chapter won the Best Documentary Film Award. In 2011, 19 countries participated, submitting a total of 190 films. Ryley Grunenwald's The Dawn of a New Day was named Best Documentary.
