= Life After Tomorrow =

2006 American documentary film

- Directed by: Gil Cates Jr. Julie Stevens
- Produced by: Gil Cates Jr. (co-producer); Julie Stevens (co-producer); Chris Kelly (executive); Motty Reif (executive)
- Cinematography: Tom Harting
- Edited by: Steven J. Escobar
- Music by: Megan Cavallari
- Release date: 2006
- Running time: 73 minutes
- Country: United States
- Language: English

Life After Tomorrow is a 2006 American documentary film. Executive producers Motty Reif and Chris Kelly, produced and directed by Gil Cates Jr. and Julie Stevens, who played Tessie in the 1979 and Pepper in the 1981 Broadway productions, about the lives of the women who had once played Little Orphan Annie or one of the other orphans in the musical Annie.

On March 24, 2006, the film was premiered at the Phoenix Film Festival where it won awards for both Best Documentary and Best Director.
