= Gilbert Cates =

American film director and television producer

- Born: Gilbert Katz; June 6, 1934; New York City, U.S.
- Died: October 31, 2011 (aged 77); Los Angeles, California, U.S.
- Education: Syracuse University
- Occupations: Film director, television producer
- Spouse(s): Jane Betty Dubin (1957–?; divorced); Judith Reichman (1987–2011; his death)
- Children: 4, including Gil Cates Jr.
- Relatives: Phoebe Cates (niece); Owen Kline (great-nephew); Greta Kline (great-niece)

Gilbert Cates (né Katz; June 6, 1934 – October 31, 2011) was an American film director and television producer, director of the Geffen Playhouse, a member of Cates/Doty Productions, and founding dean of the UCLA School of Theater, Film and Television. Cates is most known for having produced the Academy Awards telecast a record 14 times between 1990 and 2008.

== Personal life ==
Cates was born Gilbert Katz in New York City, the son of Jewish parents Nina (née Peltzman) and Nathan Katz, who was a dress manufacturer. He attended DeWitt Clinton High School, and graduated from Syracuse University. According to The Jewish Journal, Cates stumbled into his profession by accident: While a pre-med student at Syracuse University, he joined the fencing team and was asked to instruct student actors in a production of Richard III on how to handle swords. He was so taken by the experience that he changed his major to theater.

Cates was a member of the Reform Jewish Wilshire Boulevard Temple. The Jewish Journal quotes him as saying that he only attended services on the High Holy Days, but felt "very proud to be Jewish".

Cates was first married to Jane Betty Dubin and then to gynecologist Judith Reichman. He had four children from his first marriage, including Gil Cates Jr., and two stepchildren from his second marriage, and seven grandchildren. He was the younger brother of Joseph Cates who was also a director and producer, and the uncle of actress Phoebe Cates.

On October 31, 2011, Cates, 77, suffered an apparent heart attack and died in a UCLA parking lot.

== Career ==
Cates was a producing director and president of the board at the Geffen Playhouse. He directed many feature films including I Never Sang for My Father (1970), and Summer Wishes, Winter Dreams (1973), both nominated for Oscars, Oh, God! Book II (1980) and The Last Married Couple in America (1980). He also produced and directed Broadway and off-Broadway plays, including I Never Sang for My Father and You Know I Can't Hear You When the Water's Running.

Cates produced the Academy Awards 14 times between 1990 and 2008 and was credited with recruiting Billy Crystal, Whoopi Goldberg, David Letterman, Steve Martin, Chris Rock, and Jon Stewart to serve as hosts. He served on the Academy's Board of Governors from 1984 to 1993, winning an Emmy in 1991 for the 63rd annual Oscars. He returned to the board for another term beginning in 2002, and held the post of vice president from 2003 to 2005. From 1983 to 1987 he served as president of the Directors Guild of America. On April 8, 1991, he became dean of UCLA's newly combined School of Theater, Film and Television, a post he held until 1998, and was a faculty member of the school as a professor. In 2005 Cates received a star on the Hollywood Walk of Fame.
