= List of American films of 2011 =

This is a list of American films released in 2011.

== Box office ==
The highest-grossing American films released in 2011, by domestic box office gross revenue, are as follows:

Highest-grossing films of 2011
Rank	Title	Distributor	Domestic gross
1	Harry Potter and the Deathly Hallows – Part 2	Warner Bros.	$381,011,219
2	Transformers: Dark of the Moon	Paramount	$352,390,543
3	The Twilight Saga: Breaking Dawn – Part 1	Summit Entertainment	$281,287,133
4	The Hangover Part II	Warner Bros.	$254,464,305
5	Pirates of the Caribbean: On Stranger Tides	Disney	$241,071,802
6	Fast Five	Universal	$209,837,675
7	Mission: Impossible – Ghost Protocol	Paramount	$209,397,903
8	Cars 2	Disney	$191,452,396
9	Sherlock Holmes: A Game of Shadows	Warner Bros.	$186,848,418
10	Thor	Paramount	$181,030,624

== January–March ==
Opening		Title	Production company	Cast and crew	Ref.
J A N U A R Y	5	Phil Ochs: There but for Fortune	First Run Features	Kenneth Bowser (director)	
J A N U A R Y	7	Season of the Witch	Rogue Pictures / Relativity Media	Dominic Sena (director); Bragi Schut (screenplay); Nicolas Cage, Ron Perlman, Stephen Campbell Moore, Claire Foy, Stephen Graham, Christopher Lee, Robert Sheehan, Ulrich Thomsen	
J A N U A R Y	14	The Dilemma	Universal Pictures / Imagine Entertainment / Spyglass Entertainment	Ron Howard (director); Allan Loeb (screenplay); Vince Vaughn, Kevin James, Winona Ryder, Jennifer Connelly, Channing Tatum, Queen Latifah, Amy Morton, Chelcie Ross, Eduardo N. Martinez, Clint Howard, Troy West, Rance Howard	
J A N U A R Y	14	The Green Hornet	Columbia Pictures / Original Film	Michel Gondry (director); Evan Goldberg, Seth Rogen (screenplay); Seth Rogen, Jay Chou, Cameron Diaz, Christoph Waltz, Edward James Olmos, David Harbour, Tom Wilkinson, Jamie Harris, Chad L. Coleman, Edward Furlong, Lio Tipton, Jill Remez, Reuben Langdon, Jerry Trimble, James Franco	
J A N U A R Y	21	No Strings Attached	Paramount Pictures / The Montecito Picture Company / Spyglass Entertainment	Ivan Reitman (director); Elizabeth Meriwether (screenplay); Ashton Kutcher, Natalie Portman, Cary Elwes, Kevin Kline, Greta Gerwig, Ophelia Lovibond, Ben Lawson, Chris 'Ludacris' Bridges, Olivia Thirlby, Jake M. Johnson, Lake Bell, Mindy Kaling, Talia Balsam, Adhir Kalyan, Guy Branum, Jennifer Irwin, Abby Elliott, Nasim Pedrad, Matthew Moy, Stefanie Scott, Ivan Reitman	
J A N U A R Y	25	Open Season 3	Sony Pictures Home Entertainment / Sony Pictures Animation	Cody Cameron (director); David I. Stern (screenplay); Matthew J. Munn, Maddie Taylor, Melissa Sturm, Karley Scott Collins, Ciara Bravo, Harrison Fahn, Dana Snyder, André Sogliuzzo, Cody Cameron, Danny Mann, Crispin Glover, Steve Schirripa, Fred Stoller, Sean Mullen, Diedrich Bader, Olivia Hack, John Cygan, Georgia Engel, Nika Futterman, Michelle Murdocca, Jeff Bennett	
J A N U A R Y	28	The Mechanic	CBS Films / Millennium Films	Simon West (director); Richard Wenk, Lewis John Carlino (screenplay); Jason Statham, Ben Foster, Tony Goldwyn, Donald Sutherland, Mini Andén, Jeff Chase, Christa Campbell, John McConnell, Stuart Greer, Lance E. Nichols, J.D. Evermore, David Leitch, Lara Grice	
J A N U A R Y	28	The Rite	Warner Bros. Pictures / New Line Cinema	Mikael Håfström (director); Michael Petroni (screenplay); Anthony Hopkins, Colin O'Donoghue, Alice Braga, Rutger Hauer, Ciarán Hinds, Toby Jones, Marta Gastini, Maria Grazia Cucinotta, Chris Marquette, Torrey DeVitto, Marija Karan, Cecilia Dazzi	
F E B R U A R Y	4	Cold Weather	IFC Films	Aaron Katz (director); Cris Lankenau, Trieste Kelly Dunn, Raúl Castillo, Robyn Rikoon	
F E B R U A R Y	4	The Other Woman	Incentive Filmed Entertainment	Don Roos (director/screenplay); Natalie Portman, Lisa Kudrow, Lauren Ambrose, Scott Cohen	
F E B R U A R Y	4	The Roommate	Screen Gems	Christian E. Christiansen (director); Sonny Mallhi (screenplay); Leighton Meester, Minka Kelly, Cam Gigandet, Aly Michalka, Danneel Harris, Frances Fisher, Billy Zane, Matt Lanter, Nina Dobrev, Kat Graham, Tomas Arana, Alex Meraz, Nathan Parsons	
F E B R U A R Y	4	Sanctum	Universal Pictures / Relativity Media / Wayfare Entertainment / FilmNation Entertainment	Alister Grierson (director); Andrew Wight, John Garvin (screenplay); Richard Roxburgh, Rhys Wakefield, Ioan Gruffudd, Alice Parkinson, Dan Wyllie, Christopher James Baker, Allison Cratchley, Andrew Hansen	
F E B R U A R Y	4	Waiting for Forever	Freestyle Releasing	James Keach (director); Rachel Bilson, Tom Sturridge, Jamie King, Nikki Blonsky, Scott Mechlowicz, Blythe Danner, Roz Ryan, Richard Jenkins	
F E B R U A R Y	11	Carbon Nation	Earth School Education Foundation	Peter Byck (director); R. James Woolsey, Richard Branson, Denis Hayes, Van Jones, Lester R. Brown, Ralph Cavanagh, Box Fox, Thomas Friedman, Eban Goodstein, Gary Hirshberg, Sadhu Aufochs Johnston, Amory B. Lovins, Joel Makower, Edward Mazria, Arthur H. Rosenfeld	
F E B R U A R Y	11	Cedar Rapids	Fox Searchlight Pictures	Miguel Arteta (director); Phil Johnston (screenplay); Ed Helms, John C. Reilly, Anne Heche, Sigourney Weaver, Stephen Root, Kurtwood Smith, Alia Shawkat, Mike O'Malley, Rob Corddry, Seth Morris, Isiah Whitlock Jr., Thomas Lennon, Inga R. Wilson, Mike Birbiglia	
F E B R U A R Y	11	The Eagle	Focus Features / Film4 Productions	Kevin MacDonald (director); Jeremy Brock (screenplay); Channing Tatum, Jamie Bell, Donald Sutherland, Mark Strong, Tahar Rahim, Denis O'Hare, Douglas Henshall, Paul Ritter, Dakin Matthews, Pip Carter, Ned Dennehy	
F E B R U A R Y	11	Gnomeo & Juliet	Touchstone Pictures / Rocket Pictures	Kelly Asbury (director); Rob Sprackling, John R. Smith, Kevin Cecil, Andy Riley, Mark Burton (screenplay); James McAvoy, Emily Blunt, Julie Walters, Richard Wilson, Jason Statham, Ashley Jensen, Maggie Smith, Michael Caine, Patrick Stewart, Matt Lucas, Stephen Merchant, Jim Cummings, Ozzy Osbourne, Dolly Parton, Hulk Hogan, Kelly Asbury, James Daniel Wilson, Tim Bentinck	
F E B R U A R Y	11	Just Go with It	Columbia Pictures / Happy Madison Productions	Dennis Dugan (director); Allan Loeb, Tim Dowling (screenplay); Adam Sandler, Jennifer Aniston, Nicole Kidman, Brooklyn Decker, Nick Swardson, Bailee Madison, Dave Matthews, Griffin Gluck, Rachel Dratch, Kevin Nealon, Heidi Montag, Minka Kelly, Jackie Sandler, Dan Patrick, Jonathan Loughran, Peter Dante, Carol Ann Susi, Mario Joyner, Keegan-Michael Key, Allen Covert, Andy Roddick, Lori Heuring, Branscombe Richmond, Jake Shimabukuro	
F E B R U A R Y	11	Justin Bieber: Never Say Never	Paramount Pictures / Insurge Pictures / MTV Films	Jon Chu (director); Justin Bieber, Miley Cyrus, Jaden Smith, Scooter Braun, Boyz II Men, Sean Kingston, Chris 'Ludacris' Bridges, Usher Raymond, Pattie Mallette, Snoop Dogg, L.A. Reid, Jay Leno, Chelsea Handler, George Lopez, Ryan Good, Jeremy Bieber, Diane Dale, Bruce Dale, Martin Butler, Ryan Butler, Nathan McKay, Allison Kaye, Carin Morris	
F E B R U A R Y	11	Mooz-lum	Codeblack Films	Qasim "Q" Basir (director); Danny Glover, Nia Long, Evan Ross, Roger Guenveur Smith	
F E B R U A R Y	12	The Sunset Limited	HBO Films	Tommy Lee Jones (director); Cormac McCarthy (screenplay); Tommy Lee Jones, Samuel L. Jackson	
F E B R U A R Y	18	Big Mommas: Like Father, Like Son	20th Century Fox / Regency Enterprises	John Whitesell (director); Matthew Fogel, Randi Mayem Singer (screenplay); Martin Lawrence, Brandon T. Jackson, Jessica Lucas, Faizon Love, Portia Doubleday, Michelle Ang, Tony Curran, Emily Rios, Ken Jeong, Ana Ortiz, Max Casella	
F E B R U A R Y	18	I Am Number Four	Touchstone Pictures / DreamWorks Pictures / Reliance BIG Entertainment	D. J. Caruso (director); Alfred Gough, Miles Millar (screenplay); Alex Pettyfer, Timothy Olyphant, Dianna Agron, Teresa Palmer, Kevin Durand, Jake Abel, Callan McAuliffe, Judith Hoag, Beau Mirchoff, Emily Wickersham, Brian Howe, Reuben Langdon, Ken Beck, Tucker Albrizzi, Garrett M. Brown, Megan Follows, Cody Johns	
F E B R U A R Y	18	Unknown	Warner Bros. Pictures / Dark Castle Entertainment / Babelsberg Studio	Jaume Collet-Serra (director); Oliver Butcher, Stephen Cornwell, Karl Gajdusek (screenplay); Liam Neeson, Diane Kruger, January Jones, Frank Langella, Aidan Quinn, Bruno Ganz, Sebastian Koch, Stipe Erceg, Rainer Bock, Mido Hamada, Karl Markovics, Eva Löbau, Adnan Maral, Petra Schmidt-Schaller, Olivier Schneider, Clint Dyer	
F E B R U A R Y	25	Drive Angry	Summit Entertainment / Millennium Films	Patrick Lussier (director/screenplay); Todd Farmer (screenplay); Nicolas Cage, Amber Heard, David Morse, William Fichtner, Billy Burke, Katy Mixon, Charlotte Ross, Christa Campbell, Pruitt Taylor Vince, Todd Farmer, Tom Atkins, Jack McGee	
F E B R U A R Y	25	Hall Pass	Warner Bros. Pictures / New Line Cinema	Bobby Farrelly, Peter Farrelly (directors/screenplay); Owen Wilson, Jason Sudeikis, Jenna Fischer, Christina Applegate, Alyssa Milano, Joy Behar, Stephen Merchant, J.B. Smoove, Richard Jenkins, Alexandra Daddario, Nicky Whelan, Bruce Thomas, Derek Waters, Tyler Hoechlin, Larry Joe Campbell, Rob Moran, Lauren Bowles, Dwight Evans, Bo Burnham, Vanessa Angel, Kathy Griffin	
M A R C H	4	The Adjustment Bureau	Universal Pictures / Media Rights Capital	George Nolfi (director/screenplay); Matt Damon, Emily Blunt, Anthony Mackie, Terence Stamp, John Slattery, Shohreh Aghdashloo, Michael Kelly, Anthony Ruivivar, Donnie Keshawarz, Amanda Warren, Jennifer Ehle, Pedro Pascal, Brian Haley, Shane McRae, David Alan Basche, Chuck Scarborough, Jon Stewart, Michael Bloomberg, James Carville, Mary Matalin, Betty Liu	
M A R C H	4	Beastly	CBS Films	Daniel Barnz (director/screenplay); Alex Pettyfer, Vanessa Hudgens, Mary-Kate Olsen, Neil Patrick Harris, Peter Krause, LisaGay Hamilton, Dakota Johnson, Erik Knudsen, Regina King	
M A R C H	4	Rango	Paramount Pictures / Blind Wink Productions / Nickelodeon Movies / GK Films	Gore Verbinski (director); John Logan (screenplay); Johnny Depp, Isla Fisher, Abigail Breslin, Ned Beatty, Alfred Molina, Bill Nighy, Stephen Root, Harry Dean Stanton, Ray Winstone, Timothy Olyphant, Maile Flanagan, Alanna Ubach, Ian Abercrombie, Gil Birmingham, James Ward Byrkit, Claudia Black, Blake Clark, Patrika Darbo, George DelHoyo, Charles Fleischer, Beth Grant, Ryan Hurst, Vincent Kartheiser, Joe Nunez, Chris Parson, Lew Temple, Gore Verbinski, Kym Whitley, John Cothran, Jr., Alex Manugian	
M A R C H	4	Take Me Home Tonight	Relativity Media / Rogue Pictures / Imagine Entertainment	Michael Dowse (director); Jackie Filgo, Jeff Filgo (screenplay); Topher Grace, Anna Faris, Dan Fogler, Teresa Palmer, Michael Biehn, Michelle Trachtenberg, Chris Pratt, Lucy Punch, Demetri Martin, Michael Ian Black, Seth Gabel, Nathalie Kelley, Candace Kroslak, Ryan Bittle, Robert Hoffman, Edwin Hodge, Bob Odenkirk, Angie Everhart, Clement von Franckenstein, Ginnifer Goodwin	
M A R C H	11	Battle: Los Angeles	Columbia Pictures / Relativity Media / Original Film	Jonathan Liebesman (director); Christopher Bertolini (screenplay); Aaron Eckhart, Michelle Rodriguez, Michael Peña, Bridget Moynahan, Ne-Yo, Ramon Rodríguez, Cory Hardrict, Jim Parrack, Gino Anthony Pesi, Lucas Till, Noel Fisher, Adetokumboh M'Cormack, Will Rothhaar, Neil Brown Jr., Taylor Handley, James Hiroyuki Liao, Joey King	
M A R C H	11	Jane Eyre	Focus Features / BBC Films	Cary Fukunaga (director); Moira Buffini (screenplay); Mia Wasikowska, Michael Fassbender, Jamie Bell, Judi Dench, Imogen Poots, Sally Hawkins, Simon McBurney, Holliday Grainger, Tamzin Merchant, Sophie Ward, Su Elliot, Jayne Wisener, Harry Lloyd, Valentina Cervi, Craig Roberts, Ben Roberts	
M A R C H	11	Mars Needs Moms	Walt Disney Pictures / ImageMovers Digital	Simon Wells (director/screenplay); Wendy Wells (screenplay); Seth Green, Dan Fogler, Elisabeth Harnois, Mindy Sterling, Joan Cusack, Kevin Cahoon, Tom Everett Scott, Raymond Ochoa, Ryan Ochoa, Edi Patterson, Dee Bradley Baker, Seth Dusky, Robert Ochoa, Matthew Henerson, Adam Jennings, Stephen Kearin, Amber Gainey Meade, Aaron Rapke, Julene Renee, Kirsten Severson, Matthew Wolf	
M A R C H	11	Red Riding Hood	Warner Bros. Pictures	Catherine Hardwicke (director); David Leslie Johnson (screenplay); Amanda Seyfried, Gary Oldman, Shiloh Fernandez, Max Irons, Billy Burke, Julie Christie, Virginia Madsen, Lukas Haas, Michael Shanks, Christine Willes, Adrian Holmes, Michael Hogan, Alexandria Maillot, Kacey Rohl, Megan Charpentier	
M A R C H	11	Elektra Luxx	Myriad Pictures	Sebastian Gutierrez (director/screenplay); Carla Gugino, Timothy Olyphant, Joseph Gordon-Levitt, Malin Åkerman, Adrianne Palicki, Emmanuelle Chriqui, Josh Brolin	
M A R C H	18	Limitless	Relativity Media / Rogue Pictures / Virgin Produced	Neil Burger (director); Leslie Dixon (screenplay); Bradley Cooper, Robert De Niro, Abbie Cornish, Anna Friel, Johnny Whitworth, Richard Bekins, Robert John Burke, Tomas Arana, T.V. Carpio, Patricia Kalember, Andrew Howard, Ned Eisenberg	
M A R C H	18	The Lincoln Lawyer	Lionsgate / Lakeshore Entertainment / Sidney Kimmel Entertainment	Brad Furman (director); John Romano (screenplay); Matthew McConaughey, Ryan Phillippe, Marisa Tomei, Josh Lucas, John Leguizamo, Michael Peña, Bryan Cranston, Frances Fisher, William H. Macy, Trace Adkins, Bob Gunton, Laurence Mason, Margarita Levieva, Pell James, Shea Whigham, Katherine Moennig, Michael Paré, Michaela Conlin, Mackenzie Aladjem	
M A R C H	18	Paul	Universal Pictures / Relativity Media / Working Title Films	Greg Mottola (director); Nick Frost, Simon Pegg (screenplay); Nick Frost, Simon Pegg, Seth Rogen, Bill Hader, Kristen Wiig, Jason Bateman, Sigourney Weaver, Jane Lynch, John Carroll Lynch, Joe Lo Truglio, David Koechner, Blythe Danner, Jesse Plemons, Jeffrey Tambor, Bobby Lee, Steven Spielberg	
M A R C H	18	Win Win	Fox Searchlight Pictures / Everest Entertainment	Tom McCarthy (director/screenplay); Paul Giamatti, Amy Ryan, Bobby Cannavale, Melanie Lynskey, Burt Young, Jeffrey Tambor, Alex Shaffer, Margo Martindale, David W. Thompson, Nina Arianda, Marcia Haufrecht, Sharon Wilkins, Clare Foley, Mike Diliello, Tim Ransom	
M A R C H	25	Diary of a Wimpy Kid: Rodrick Rules	20th Century Fox / Fox 2000 Pictures	David Bowers (director); Jeff Filgo, Jackie Filgo, Jeff Judah, Gabe Sachs (screenplay); Zachary Gordon, Robert Capron, Rachael Harris, Devon Bostick, Peyton List, Steve Zahn, Fran Kranz, Grayson Russell, Karan Brar, Laine MacNeil, Conner and Owen Fielding, Terence Kelly, Belita Moreno, Andrew McNee, Alfred E. Humphreys, Serge Houde, Teryl Rothery, Melissa Roxburgh, Dalila Bela, Jeff Kinney, John Shaw, Bryce Hodgson, Jakob Davies, Kevin Kazahoff, Michelle Harrison, Graeme Duffy, Ben Hollingsworth, Elysia Rotaru, Brenda Anderson, Doreen Ramus, Betty Phillips, Tae Helgeth, Sheila Paterson, Monica Marko	
M A R C H	25	Sucker Punch	Warner Bros. Pictures / Legendary Pictures / Cruel and Unusual Films	Zack Snyder (director/screenplay); Steve Shibuya (screenplay); Emily Browning, Abbie Cornish, Jamie Chung, Jena Malone, Vanessa Hudgens, Carla Gugino, Scott Glenn, Jon Hamm, Oscar Isaac, Patrick Sabongui	

== April–June ==
Opening		Title	Production company	Cast and crew	Ref.
A P R I L	1	Insidious	FilmDistrict / Haunted Movies / Stage 6 Films / Alliance Films / IM Global	James Wan (director); Leigh Whannell (screenplay); Patrick Wilson, Rose Byrne, Barbara Hershey, Lin Shaye, Ty Simpkins, Leigh Whannell, Angus Sampson, Joseph Bishara, J. LaRose, Ben Woolf	
A P R I L	1	Hop	Universal Pictures / Relativity Media / Illumination Entertainment	Tim Hill (director); Cinco Paul, Ken Daurio, Brian Lynch (screenplay); Russell Brand, James Marsden, Kaley Cuoco, Elizabeth Perkins, Hank Azaria, Gary Cole, David Hasselhoff, Chelsea Handler, Hugh Laurie, Tiffany Espensen, Dustin Ybarra, Hugh Hefner, Django Marsh	
A P R I L	1	Source Code	Summit Entertainment / Vendôme Pictures	Duncan Jones (director); Ben Ripley (screenplay); Jake Gyllenhaal, Michelle Monaghan, Vera Farmiga, Jeffrey Wright, Michael Arden, Russell Peters, Scott Bakula, Frédérick De Grandpré, Cas Anvar	
A P R I L	1	Super	IFC Midnight Films / This Is That Productions / HanWay Films / Ambush Entertainment	James Gunn (director/screenplay); Rainn Wilson, Elliot Page, Liv Tyler, Kevin Bacon, Nathan Fillion, Gregg Henry, Michael Rooker, Andre Royo, Sean Gunn, Stephen Blackehart, Linda Cardellini, William Katt, Rob Zombie, Zach Gilford, Steve Agee, Mollie Milligan, James Gunn	
A P R I L	1	Trust	Millennium Films / Nu Image	David Schwimmer (director); Andy Bellin, Robert Festinger (screenplay); Clive Owen, Catherine Keener, Jason Clarke, Liana Liberato, Viola Davis, Chris Henry Coffey, Noah Emmerich, Zoe Levin, Spencer Curnutt, Aislinn Debutch	
A P R I L	8	Arthur	Warner Bros. Pictures	Jason Winer (director); Peter Baynham (screenplay); Russell Brand, Helen Mirren, Jennifer Garner, Luis Guzmán, Greta Gerwig, Nick Nolte, Geraldine James, Evander Holyfield, Murphy Guyer, Jennie Eisenhower, Christina Calph, John Hodgman, Nigel Barker, Scott Adsit	
A P R I L	8	Hanna	Focus Features	Joe Wright (director); Seth Lochhead, David Farr (screenplay); Saoirse Ronan, Cate Blanchett, Eric Bana, Jason Flemyng, Olivia Williams, Tom Hollander, Vicky Krieps, John Macmillan, Michelle Dockery, Jessica Barden, Joel Basman, Álvaro Cervantes, Martin Wuttke	
A P R I L	8	Henry's Crime	Moving Pictures Film and Television / Maitland Primrose Group	Malcolm Venville (director); Sacha Gervasi, David N. White (screenplay); Keanu Reeves, Vera Farmiga, James Caan, Judy Greer, Fisher Stevens, Peter Stormare, Bill Duke, Danny Hoch, Currie Graham, David Costabile	
A P R I L	8	Soul Surfer	TriStar Pictures / FilmDistrict / Mandalay Vision	Sean McNamara (director/screenplay); Michael Berk, Douglas Schwartz (screenplay); Dennis Quaid, AnnaSophia Robb, Helen Hunt, Carrie Underwood, Kevin Sorbo, Ross Thomas, Chris Brochu, Lorraine Nicholson, Jeremy Sumpter, Sonia Balmores Chung, Craig T. Nelson, Branscombe Richmond, Bethany Hamilton, Alana Blanchard, Sean McNamara, Tatiana Weston-Webb	
A P R I L	8	Your Highness	Universal Pictures	David Gordon Green (director); Danny McBride, Ben Best (screenplay); Danny McBride, James Franco, Natalie Portman, Zooey Deschanel, Justin Theroux, Toby Jones, Damian Lewis, Rasmus Hardiker, Caroline Grace-Cassidy, Simon Farnaby, Deobia Oparei, Charles Dance, John Fricker, Angela Pleasence, Charles Shaughnessy, Rhian Sugden, Amii Grove, Madison Welch	
A P R I L	15	Atlas Shrugged: Part I	Rocky Mountain Pictures	Paul Johansson (director); Brian Patrick O'Toole (screenplay); Taylor Schilling, Grant Bowler, Matthew Marsden, Graham Beckel, Edi Gathegi, Jsu Garcia, Michael Lerner, Jack Milo, Ethan Cohn, Rebecca Wisocky, Christina Pickles, Neill Barry, Patrick Fischler, Sylva Kelegian, Jon Polito, Michael O'Keefe, Geoff Pierson, Armin Shimerman, Paul Johansson	
A P R I L	15	The Conspirator	Lionsgate / Roadside Attractions / American Film Company / Wildwood Enterprises, Inc	Robert Redford (director); James D. Solomon (screenplay); James McAvoy, Robin Wright, Kevin Kline, Evan Rachel Wood, Danny Huston, Justin Long, Colm Meaney, Tom Wilkinson, Alexis Bledel, Stephen Root, Jonathan Groff, Johnny Simmons, Toby Kebbell, Norman Reedus, John Cullum, Shea Whigham, James Badge Dale, Jim True-Frost, Chris Bauer, David Andrews, Brian F. Durkin, Cullen Moss, Jason Hatfield, Amy Tipton, Cal Johnson	
A P R I L	15	Rio	20th Century Fox / Blue Sky Studios	Carlos Saldanha (director); Don Rhymer, Joshua Sternin, Jeffrey Ventimilia, Sam Harper (screenplay); Jesse Eisenberg, Anne Hathaway, will.i.am, Jamie Foxx, George Lopez, Tracy Morgan, Jemaine Clement, Rodrigo Santoro, Leslie Mann, Jake T. Austin, Jane Lynch, Wanda Sykes, Carlos Ponce, Jeff Garcia, Bebel Gilberto, Tom Wilson, Judah Friedlander, Phil Miler, Carlos Saldanha, Sergio Mendes, Gracinha Leporace, Ester Dean, Karen Disher, Carlinhos Brown, Jean Gilpin, Nicholas Guest, Rif Hutton, Sergio Kato, Davi Vieira, Bernando de Paula, Francisco Ramos	
A P R I L	15	Scream 4	Dimension Films	Wes Craven (director); Kevin Williamson (screenplay); Neve Campbell, Courteney Cox, David Arquette, Emma Roberts, Hayden Panettiere, Anthony Anderson, Adam Brody, Rory Culkin, Mary McDonnell, Marley Shelton, Alison Brie, Marielle Jaffe, Nico Tortorella, Erik Knudsen, Anna Paquin, Kristen Bell, Lucy Hale, Shenae Grimes, Britt Robertson, Aimee Teegarden, Roger L. Jackson	
A P R I L	22	African Cats	Disneynature	Alastair Fothergill, Keith Scholey (directors); Samuel L. Jackson	
A P R I L	22	Madea's Big Happy Family	Lionsgate / Tyler Perry Studios	Tyler Perry (director/screenplay); Tyler Perry, Loretta Devine, Bow Wow, Lauren London, Isaiah Mustafa, Tamela Mann, Cassi Davis, Shannon Kane, Natalie Desselle-Reid, Rodney Perry, David Mann, Teyana Taylor, Philip Anthony-Rodriguez, Chandra Currelley, Maury Povich	
A P R I L	22	POM Wonderful Presents: The Greatest Movie Ever Sold	Sony Pictures Classics	Morgan Spurlock (director/screenplay) Jeremy Chilnick (screenplay); Morgan Spurlock, Ben Silverman, Noam Chomsky, OK Go, Ralph Nader	
A P R I L	22	Water for Elephants	20th Century Fox	Francis Lawrence (director); Richard LaGravenese (screenplay); Robert Pattinson, Reese Witherspoon, Christoph Waltz, Hal Holbrook, Ken Foree, James Frain, Paul Schneider, Tim Guinee, Mark Povinelli, Scott MacDonald, Jim Norton, Richard Brake, Sam Anderson, John Aylward, Brad Greenquist, Tai, Uggie	
A P R I L	23	Cinema Verite	HBO Films	Shari Springer Berman, Robert Pulcini (directors); David Seltzer (screenplay); Diane Lane, Tim Robbins, James Gandolfini, Kathleen Quinlan, Thomas Dekker, Patrick Fugit, Shanna Collins, Willam Belli, Lolita Davidovich, Kyle Riabko, Kaitlyn Dever, Nick Eversman, Johnny Simmons, Caitlin Custer, Jake Richardson, Matt O'Leary, Stephen Caffrey, Richard Fancy, Don McManus, Robert Curtis Brown, Dawn Hudson, Molly Hagan, Sean O'Bryan, Michelle Morgan, Emilio Rivera, Johnny Carson, Dick Cavett, Bill Loud, Lance Loud, James Urbaniak	
A P R I L	29	Dylan Dog: Dead of Night	Freestyle Releasing	Kevin Munroe (director); Joshua Oppenheimer, Thomas Dean Donnelly (screenplay); Brandon Routh, Taye Diggs, Sam Huntington, Anita Briem, Kurt Angle, Peter Stormare, Laura Spencer, Marco St. John	
A P R I L	29	Fast Five	Universal Pictures / Original Film	Justin Lin (director); Chris Morgan (screenplay); Vin Diesel, Paul Walker, Jordana Brewster, Tyrese Gibson, Chris "Ludacris" Bridges, Matt Schulze, Sung Kang, Dwayne Johnson, Joaquim de Almeida, Gal Gadot, Elsa Pataky, Tego Calderón, Don Omar, Michael Irby, Fernando F. Chien, Alimi Ballard, Yorgo Constantine, Kent Shocknek, Sharon Tay, Eva Mendes, Michelle Rodriguez, Johnny Strong, Hélène Cardona	
A P R I L	29	Hoodwinked Too! Hood vs. Evil	The Weinstein Company / Kanbar Entertainment	Mike Disa (director/screenplay); Cory Edwards, Todd Edwards, Tony Leech (screenplay); Glenn Close, Cheech Marin, Tommy Chong, Hayden Panettiere, Amy Poehler, Martin Short, Patrick Warburton, Joan Cusack, David Ogden Stiers, Bill Hader, Cory Edwards, Brad Garrett, Andy Dick, David Alan Grier, Phil LaMarr, Wayne Newton, Danny Pudi, Debra Wilson Skelton, Tress MacNeille, Heidi Klum, Mike Disa, Rob Paulsen, Ian James Corlett, Brian T. Delaney, Nicholas Guest, Kyle Hebert, Bridget Hoffman, Wendee Lee, Stephanie Sheh, Keith Silverstein, Benjy Gaither, Clarissa Jacobson, Lance Holt, Rebecca Andersen	
A P R I L	29	Prom	Walt Disney Pictures	Joe Nussbaum (director); Katie Wech (screenplay); Aimee Teegarden, Thomas McDonell, Cameron Monaghan, Nolan Sotillo, Danielle Campbell, Kylie Bunbury, DeVaughn Nixon, Jared Kusnitz, Nicholas Braun, Joe Adler, Jonathan Keltz, Christine Elise McCarthy, Raini Rodriguez, Dean Norris, Faith Ford, Robbie Tucker, Jere Burns, Allie Trimm, Amy Pietz, Blair Fowler, Riley Voelkel, Kofi Siriboe, Yin Chang, Janelle Ortiz, Afam Okeke, Aimee-Lynn Chadwick, Carlease Burke, Madison Riley, Rocco Nugent, Ivy Malone, Chloe Little, Kristopher Higgins	
M A Y	6	The Beaver	Summit Entertainment / Anonymous Content / Participant Media / Imagenation Abu Dhabi	Jodie Foster (director); Kyle Killen (screenplay); Mel Gibson, Jodie Foster, Anton Yelchin, Jennifer Lawrence, Riley Thomas Stewart, Zachary Booth, Cherry Jones, Matt Lauer	
M A Y	6	Hobo with a Shotgun	Rhombus Media / Whizbang Films / Yer Dead Productions	Jason Eisener (director); John Davies (screenplay); Rutger Hauer, Gregory Smith, Brian Downey, Molly Dunsworth, Nick Bateman, Peter Simas, Robb Wells, Jeremy Akerman, George Stroumboulopoulos	
M A Y	6	Jumping the Broom	TriStar Pictures / Stage 6 Films	Salim Akil (director); Arlene Gibbs, Elizabeth Hunter (screenplay); Angela Bassett, Paula Patton, Laz Alonso, Loretta Devine, Mike Epps, Meagan Good, Tasha Smith, Julie Bowen, DeRay Davis, Valarie Pettiford, Pooch Hall, Romeo Miller, Brian Stokes Mitchell, Gary Dourdan, T.D. Jakes, Tenika Davis, Vera Cudjoe, El DeBarge	
M A Y	6	Something Borrowed	Warner Bros. Pictures / Alcon Entertainment	Luke Greenfield (director); Jennie Snyder Urman (screenplay); Ginnifer Goodwin, Kate Hudson, John Krasinski, Colin Egglesfield, Steve Howey, Ashley Williams, Geoff Pierson, Jill Eikenberry	
M A Y	6	Thor	Paramount Pictures / Marvel Studios	Kenneth Branagh (director); Mark Protosevich, Zack Stentz, Ashley Edward Miller, Don Payne (screenplay); Chris Hemsworth, Natalie Portman, Tom Hiddleston, Stellan Skarsgård, Kat Dennings, Clark Gregg, Colm Feore, Ray Stevenson, Idris Elba, Jaimie Alexander, Rene Russo, Anthony Hopkins, Tadanobu Asano, Josh Dallas, Adriana Barraza, Maximiliano Hernández, Joseph Gatt, Jamie McShane, Dale Godboldo, Patrick O'Brien Demsey, J. Michael Straczynski, Matt Battaglia, Stan Lee, Joel McCrary, Isaac Kappy, Dakota Goyo, Samuel L. Jackson, Jeremy Renner, Walter Simonson, Jimmy Star, Douglas Tait	
M A Y	13	Bridesmaids	Universal Pictures / Relativity Media	Paul Feig (director); Annie Mumolo, Kristen Wiig (screenplay); Kristen Wiig, Maya Rudolph, Rose Byrne, Melissa McCarthy, Wendi McLendon-Covey, Ellie Kemper, Chris O'Dowd, Jill Clayburgh, Matt Lucas, Rebel Wilson, Michael Hitchcock, Tim Heidecker, Ben Falcone, Mitch Silpa, Terry Crews, Elaine Kao, Kali Hawk, Steve Bannos, Hugh Dane, Franklin Ajaye, Lynne Marie Stewart, Andy Buckley, Matt Bennett, Nancy Carell, Melanie Hutsell, Eloy Casados, Jessica St. Clair, Annie Mumolo, Mia Rose Frampton, Jordan Black, Jillian Bell, Richard Riehle, Jimmy Brogan, Wilson Phillips, Jon Hamm, Pat Carroll, Paul Feig	
M A Y	13	Priest	Screen Gems	Scott Stewart (director); Cory Goodman (screenplay); Paul Bettany, Cam Gigandet, Lily Collins, Karl Urban, Maggie Q, Stephen Moyer, Christopher Plummer, Brad Dourif, Mädchen Amick	
M A Y	20	Midnight in Paris	Sony Pictures Classics	Woody Allen (director/screenplay); Owen Wilson, Rachel McAdams, Kathy Bates, Adrien Brody, Marion Cotillard, Michael Sheen, Carla Bruni, Tom Hiddleston, Alison Pill, Corey Stoll, Nina Arianda, Kurt Fuller, Mimi Kennedy, Léa Seydoux, Sonia Rolland, Daniel Lundh, Marcial Di Fonzo Bo, Gad Elmaleh, David Lowe, Olivier Rabourdin, Karine Vanasse, Michel Vuillermoz, Catherine Benguigui, Audrey Fleurot, Guillaume Gouix, Yves Heck, Thérèse Bourou-Rubinsztein, Emmanuelle Uzan, Tom Cordier, Adrien de Van, Serge Bagdassarian, Yves-Antonie Spoto, Vincent Menjou Cortes, François Rostain	
M A Y	20	Pirates of the Caribbean: On Stranger Tides	Walt Disney Pictures / Jerry Bruckheimer Films	Rob Marshall (director); Ted Elliott, Terry Rossio (screenplay); Johnny Depp, Geoffrey Rush, Ian McShane, Penélope Cruz, Kevin R. McNally, Sam Claflin, Àstrid Bergès-Frisbey, Stephen Graham, Richard Griffiths, Greg Ellis, Damian O'Hare, Óscar Jaenada, Keith Richards, Anton Lesser, Roger Allam, Judi Dench, Christopher Fairbank, Paul Bazely, Bronson Webb, Yuki Matsuzaki, Robbie Kay, Steve Evets, Ian Mercer, Deobia Oparei, Gemma Ward, Sebastian Armesto, Juan Carlos Vellido, Gerard Monaco, Luke Roberts, Daniel Ings, Emilia Jones, Patrick Kennedy, Clifford Rose, Derek Mears	
M A Y	23	Too Big to Fail	HBO Films / Spring Creek Productions / Deuce Three Productions	Curtis Hanson (director); Peter Gould (screenplay); William Hurt, Edward Asner, Billy Crudup, Paul Giamatti, Topher Grace, Cynthia Nixon, Bill Pullman, Tony Shalhoub, James Woods, Matthew Modine, Michael O'Keefe, Ayad Akhtar, Kathy Baker, Amy Carlson, Evan Handler, John Heard, Dan Hedaya, Peter Hermann, Chance Kelly, Tom Mason, Ajay Mehta, Tom Tammi, Laila Robins, Victor Slezak, Joey Slotnick, Casey Biggs, Steve Tom, Bud Jones, Jonathan Freeman	
M A Y	26	Kung Fu Panda 2	Paramount Pictures / DreamWorks Animation	Jennifer Yuh Nelson (director); Jonathan Aibel, Glenn Berger (screenplay); Jack Black, Angelina Jolie, Gary Oldman, Dustin Hoffman, Jackie Chan, Seth Rogen, Lucy Liu, David Cross, James Hong, Michelle Yeoh, Danny McBride, Dennis Haysbert, Jean-Claude Van Damme, Victor Garber, Paul Mazursky, Romy Rosemont, Maury Sterling, Fred Tatasciore, Lauren Tom, Conrad Vernon, Liam Knight	
M A Y	26	The Hangover Part II	Warner Bros. Pictures / Legendary Pictures / Green Hat Films	Todd Phillips (director/screenplay); Scot Armstrong, Craig Mazin (screenplay); Bradley Cooper, Ed Helms, Zach Galifianakis, Justin Bartha, Jeffrey Tambor, Ken Jeong, Mike Tyson, Bryan Callen, Paul Giamatti, Jamie Chung, Nick Cassavetes, Sasha Barrese, Gillian Vigman, Mason Lee, Sondra Currie, Brody Stevens, Michael Berry Jr., Andrew Howard, Yasmin Lee, Nirut Sirijanya, Penpak Sirikul, Crystal the Monkey, Todd Phillips	
M A Y	27	The Tree of Life	Fox Searchlight Pictures / Plan B Entertainment	Terrence Malick (director/screenplay); Brad Pitt, Sean Penn, Jessica Chastain, Hunter McCracken, Laramie Eppler, Tye Sheridan	
J U N E	3	Beautiful Boy	Anchor Bay Entertainment	Shawn Ku (director/screenplay); Michael Armbruster (screenplay); Maria Bello, Michael Sheen, Alan Tudyk, Moon Bloodgood, Kyle Gallner, Meat Loaf, Bruce French, Austin Nichols, David Lipper, Brooke Lyons, Jessie Usher, Myra Turley	
J U N E	3	Beginners	Focus Features / Olympus Pictures	Mike Mills (director/screenplay); Ewan McGregor, Christopher Plummer, Mélanie Laurent, Goran Višnjić, Mary Page Keller, China Shavers, Lou Taylor Pucci	
J U N E	3	Submarine	The Weinstein Company / Warp Films / Film4 Productions / UK Film Council / Red Hour Films	Richard Ayoade (director/screenplay); Craig Roberts, Yasmin Paige, Noah Taylor, Paddy Considine, Sally Hawkins, Gemma Chan, Melanie Walters, Steffan Rhodri, Ben Stiller	
J U N E	3	X-Men: First Class	20th Century Fox / Bad Hat Harry Productions / Marvel Entertainment / Dune Entertainment	Matthew Vaughn (director/screenplay); Ashley Edward Miller, Zack Stentz, Jane Goldman (screenplay); James McAvoy, Michael Fassbender, Rose Byrne, Jennifer Lawrence, January Jones, Nicholas Hoult, Oliver Platt, Jason Flemyng, Lucas Till, Edi Gathegi, Kevin Bacon, Caleb Landry Jones, Zoë Kravitz, Matt Craven, Álex González, Rade Šerbedžija, Glenn Morshower, Corey Johnson, Demetri Goritsas, Don Creech, James Remar, Ludger Pistor, Ray Wise, Olek Krupa, Gene Farber, James Faulkner, Annabelle Wallis, Sasha Pieterse, Brendan Fehr, Michael Ironside, Jason Beghe, Tony Curran, Randall Batinkoff, Laurence Belcher, Bill Milner, Morgan Lily, Hugh Jackman, Jim Meskimen, Rebecca Romijn	
J U N E	7	The Lion of Judah	Animated Family Films	Deryck Broom, Roger Hawkins (directors); Brent Dawes (screenplay); Michael Madsen, Ernest Borgnine, Scott Eastwood, Vic Mignogna	
J U N E	10	Judy Moody and the Not Bummer Summer	Relativity Media / Smokewood Entertainment	John Schultz (director); Kathy Waugh, Megan McDonald (screenplay); Jordana Beatty, Heather Graham, Parris Mosteller, Janet Varney, Kristoffer Winters, Jaleel White, Preston Bailey, Taylar Hender, Bobbi Sue Luther, Hunter King, Ashley Boettcher, Robert Costanzo, Cameron Boyce, Dean Cameron, Brian Palermo, Richard Riehle	
J U N E	10	Road to Nowhere	Monterey Media / E1 Films	Monte Hellman (director); Steven Gaydos (screenplay); Cliff De Young, Waylon Payne, Tygh Runyan, Shannyn Sossamon, Dominique Swain, John Diehl, Rob Kolar, Fabio Testi, Bonnie Pointer, Lathan McKay, Peter Bart, Nic Paul, Michael Bigham	
J U N E	10	Super 8	Paramount Pictures / Amblin Entertainment / Bad Robot	J.J. Abrams (director/screenplay); Joel Courtney, Elle Fanning, Kyle Chandler, Riley Griffiths, Ryan Lee, Ron Eldard, Gabriel Basso, Zach Mills, AJ Michalka, Joel McKinnon Miller, Jessica Tuck, Brett Rice, Noah Emmerich, Richard T. Jones, Bruce Greenwood, David Gallagher, Glynn Turman, Dan Castellaneta, Caitriona Balfe, Patrick St. Esprit, Katie Lowes, Michael Giacchino, Michael Hitchcock, Jay Scully, Beau Knapp, Dale Dickey, Amanda Foreman, Thomas F. Duffy, Teri Clark Linden, Bingo O'Malley, Jason Brooks, Tim Griffin, Marco Sanchez, Jonathan Dixon, Greg Grunberg, Walter Cronkite, Jake McLaughlin, Alex Nevil	
J U N E	17	The Art of Getting By	Fox Searchlight Pictures / Gigi Films / Goldcrest Films	Gavin Wiesen (director/screenplay); Freddie Highmore, Emma Roberts, Michael Angarano, Elizabeth Reaser, Sam Robards, Rita Wilson, Blair Underwood, Alicia Silverstone, Marcus Carl Franklin, Sasha Spielberg, Jarlath Conroy, Ann Dowd	
J U N E	17	Buck	IFC Films	Cindy Meehl (director); Buck Brannaman	
J U N E	17	Green Lantern	Warner Bros. Pictures / DC Comics	Martin Campbell (director); Greg Berlanti, Michael Green, Marc Guggenheim, Michael Goldenberg (screenplay); Ryan Reynolds, Blake Lively, Peter Sarsgaard, Mark Strong, Tim Robbins, Geoffrey Rush, Angela Bassett, Temuera Morrison, Michael Clarke Duncan, Taika Waititi, Clancy Brown, Jon Tenney, Jay O. Sanders, Mike Doyle, Nick Jandl	
J U N E	17	Mr. Popper's Penguins	20th Century Fox / Dune Entertainment / Davis Entertainment	Mark Waters (director); Sean Anders, John Morris, Jared Stern (screenplay); Jim Carrey, Carla Gugino, Angela Lansbury, Madeline Carroll, Clark Gregg, Maxwell Perry Cotton, Desmin Borges, Philip Baker Hall, Dominic Chianese, Ophelia Lovibond, Jeffrey Tambor, David Krumholtz, James Tupper, Brian T. Delaney, Betsy Aidem, Frank Welker	
J U N E	24	A Better Life	Summit Entertainment	Chris Weitz (director); Eric Eason (screenplay); Demián Bichir, José Julián, Dolores Heredia, Carlos Linares, Eddie "Piolín" Sotelo, Joaquín Cosío, Nancy Lenehan, Gabriel Chavarria	
J U N E	24	Bad Teacher	Columbia Pictures / Mosaic Media Group	Jake Kasdan (director); Lee Eisenberg, Gene Stupnitsky (screenplay); Cameron Diaz, Justin Timberlake, Jason Segel, Lucy Punch, Phyllis Smith, John Michael Higgins, Dave Allen, Jillian Armenante, Kaitlyn Dever, Kathryn Newton, Molly Shannon, Eric Stonestreet, Thomas Lennon, Noah Munck, Finneas O'Connell, Jeff Judah, Nat Faxon, Stephanie Faracy, David Paymer, Alanna Ubach, Christine Smith, Paul Feig, Deirdre Lovejoy, Rose Abdoo, Jerry Lambert, Jennifer Irwin, Rick Overton, Matt Besser, Lee Eisenberg, Dot-Marie Jones, Ryan Seacrest	
J U N E	24	Cars 2	Walt Disney Pictures / Pixar Animation Studios	John Lasseter, Brad Lewis (directors); Ben Queen (screenplay); Larry the Cable Guy, Owen Wilson, Michael Caine, Emily Mortimer, John Turturro, Eddie Izzard, Brent Musburger, Joe Mantegna, Thomas Kretschmann, Peter Jacobson, Bonnie Hunt, Darrell Waltrip, Franco Nero, David Hobbs, Tony Shalhoub, Jeff Garlin, Jason Isaacs, Lloyd Sherr, Bruce Campbell, Teresa Gallagher, Jenifer Lewis, Stanley Townsend, Velibor Topic, Sig Hansen, Guido Quaroni, Vanessa Redgrave, Brad Lewis, Cheech Marin, Jeff Gordon, Lewis Hamilton, Paul Dooley, Edie McClurg, Richard Kind, Katherine Helmond, John Ratzenberger, Michael Wallis, John Lasseter, Daisuke "Dice" Tsutsumi, Patrick Walker, Michel Michelis, John Mainieri, Catherine Bolt, Gillian Bolt, Jess Fulton, Sonoko Konishi	
J U N E	24	Conan O'Brien Can't Stop	Magnolia Pictures / Abramorama	Rodman Flender (director); Conan O'Brien, Andy Richter, Sona Movsesian, Jimmy Vivino, Scott Healy, Mike Merritt, James Wormworth, Jerry Vivino, Mark Pender, Richie Rosenberg, Jon Hamm, Jack McBrayer, Tenacious D, Jon Stewart, Stephen Colbert, Jim Carrey, Eddie Vedder, Jack White, Rodman Flender, Rachael L. Hollingsworth, Fredericka Meek	
J U N E	29	Transformers: Dark of the Moon	Paramount Pictures / Hasbro	Michael Bay (director); Ehren Kruger (screenplay); Shia LaBeouf, Josh Duhamel, John Turturro, Tyrese Gibson, Rosie Huntington-Whiteley, Patrick Dempsey, Kevin Dunn, Julie White, John Malkovich, Frances McDormand, Keiko Agena, Lester Speight, Josh Kelly, Alan Tudyk, Ken Jeong, Glenn Morshower, Buzz Aldrin, Bill O'Reilly, Elya Baskin, Andy Daly, Iqbal Theba, Sammy Sheik, Mindy Sterling, Chris Sheffield, Ravil Isyanov, LaMonica Garrett, Tom Virtue, Peter Murnik, Lindsey Ginter, David St. James, Inna Korobkina, Kathleen Gati, Scott Krinsky, Maile Flanagan, Meredith Monroe, Danny McCarthy, Mark Ryan, Walter Cronkite, John F. Kennedy, Richard Nixon, Peter Cullen, Hugo Weaving, Leonard Nimoy, Jess Harnell, Charlie Adler, Robert Foxworth, James Remar, Francesco Quinn, George Coe, Tom Kenny, Reno Wilson, Frank Welker, John DiMaggio, Keith Szarabajka, Greg Berg, Jim Meskimen, Ron Bottitta, Jim Wood	

== July–September ==
Opening		Title	Production company	Cast and crew	Ref.
J U L Y	1	Larry Crowne	Universal Pictures	Tom Hanks (director/screenplay); Nia Vardalos (screenplay); Tom Hanks, Julia Roberts, Taraji P. Henson, Cedric the Entertainer, George Takei, Rita Wilson, Bryan Cranston, Gugu Mbatha-Raw, Wilmer Valderrama, Pam Grier, Rami Malek, Maria Canals-Barrera, Sy Richardson, Dale Dye, Ian Gomez, Malcolm Barrett, Chet Hanks, Nia Vardalos, Jon Seda, Grace Gummer, Rob Riggle, Barry Sobel, Tina Huang, Randall Park	
J U L Y	1	Monte Carlo	20th Century Fox / Fox 2000 Pictures / Regency Enterprises	Tom Bezucha (director/screenplay); Maria Maggenti, April Blair (screenplay); Selena Gomez, Leighton Meester, Katie Cassidy, Cory Monteith, Andie MacDowell, Pierre Boulanger, Luke Bracey, Catherine Tate, Brett Cullen, Giulio Berruti, Valérie Lemercier, Franck de Lapersonne	
J U L Y	1	The Perfect Host	Magnolia Pictures	Nicholas Tomnay (director/screenplay); Krishna Jones (screenplay); David Hyde Pierce, Clayne Crawford, Helen Reddy, Megahn Perry, Joseph Will, Nathaniel Parker	
J U L Y	6	Septien	IFC Films	Michael Tully (director); Michael Tully, Onur Tukel, Robert Longstreet, Rachel Korine	
J U L Y	8	Beats, Rhymes & Life: The Travels of A Tribe Called Quest	Sony Pictures Classics	Michael Rapaport (director); A Tribe Called Quest	
J U L Y	8	Horrible Bosses	Warner Bros. Pictures / New Line Cinema	Seth Gordon (director); Michael Markowitz, John Francis Daley, Jonathan Goldstein (screenplay); Jason Bateman, Charlie Day, Jason Sudeikis, Jamie Foxx, Jennifer Aniston, Kevin Spacey, Colin Farrell, Donald Sutherland, Julie Bowen, Lindsay Sloane, Barry Livingston, Meghan Markle, John Francis Daley, P.J. Byrne, Dave Sheridan, Ioan Gruffudd, Brian George, Chad L. Coleman, Isaiah Mustafa, Wendell Pierce, Ron White, Bob Newhart, Seth Gordon	
J U L Y	8	Project Nim	Roadside Attractions	James Marsh (director); Bob Angelini, Bern Cohen, Renne Falitz, Bob Ingersoll	
J U L Y	8	The Ward	ARC Entertainment / XLrator Media / Echo Lake Entertainment / A Bigger Boat	John Carpenter (director); Michael Rasmussen, Shawn Rasmussen (screenplay); Amber Heard, Mamie Gummer, Danielle Panabaker, Laura-Leigh, Lyndsy Fonseca, Mika Boorem, Jared Harris, Susanna Burney, Mark Chamberlin, Sydney Sweeney	
J U L Y	8	Zookeeper	Columbia Pictures / Metro-Goldwyn-Mayer	Frank Coraci (director); Nick Bakay, Kevin James, Rock Reuben, Jay Sherick, David Ronn (screenplay); Kevin James, Rosario Dawson, Leslie Bibb, Ken Jeong, Donnie Wahlberg, Joe Rogan, Nat Faxon, Steffiana de la Cruz, Nick Bakay, Jackie Sandler, Nick Turturro, Thomas Gottschalk, Brandon Keener, Gary Valentine, Nick Nolte, Sylvester Stallone, Adam Sandler, Cher, Judd Apatow, Jon Favreau, Faizon Love, Maya Rudolph, Bas Rutten, Don Rickles, Jim Breuer, Tom Woodruff, Jr., Bart the Bear 2, Crystal the Monkey	
J U L Y	15	Harry Potter and the Deathly Hallows – Part 2	Warner Bros. Pictures / Heyday Films	David Yates (director); Steve Kloves (screenplay); Daniel Radcliffe, Rupert Grint, Emma Watson, Helena Bonham Carter, Robbie Coltrane, Warwick Davis, David Bradley, Tom Felton, Ralph Fiennes, Michael Gambon, John Hurt, Jason Isaacs, Gary Oldman, Alan Rickman, Maggie Smith, Jim Broadbent, Timothy Spall, David Thewlis, Emma Thompson, Julie Walters, Mark Williams, Bonnie Wright, Matthew Lewis, James Phelps, Oliver Phelps, Chris Rankin, Natalia Tena, Evanna Lynch, Adrian Rawlins, Geraldine Somerville, Ciarán Hinds, Domhnall Gleeson, Clémence Poésy, Kelly Macdonald, Helen McCrory, Miriam Margoyles, Gemma Jones, Jessie Cave, Afshan Azad, Anna Shaffer, Georgina Leonidas, Devon Murray, Freddie Stroma, Alfred Enoch, Katie Leung, Ralph Ineson, Scarlett Byrne, Josh Herdman, George Harris, Guy Henry, Nick Moran, Dave Legeno, Alfie McIlwain, Ellie Darcey-Alden, Leslie Phillips	
J U L Y	15	Lucky	Phase 4 Films / Ten/Four Pictures / Tax Credit Finance / Mirabelle Pictures	Gil Cates Jr. (director); Kent Sublette (screenplay); Colin Hanks, Ari Graynor, Ann-Margret, Mimi Rogers, Jeffrey Tambor, Adam J. Harrington, Allison Mackie, Tom Amandes, Michelle Davidson, Michael Arata, Meghan Strange, Jason Harris Katz	
J U L Y	15	Winnie the Pooh	Walt Disney Pictures / Walt Disney Animation Studios	Stephen Anderson, Don Hall (directors); Jim Cummings, Tom Kenny, Craig Ferguson, Travis Oates, Bud Luckey, John Cleese, Huell Howser, Jack Boulter, Kristen Anderson-Lopez, Wyatt Dean Hall	
J U L Y	22	Another Earth	Fox Searchlight Pictures	Mike Cahill (director/screenplay); Brit Marling (screenplay); William Mapother, Brit Marling, Robin Lord Taylor, Kumar Pallana, Rupert Reid, Richard Berendzen, Jordan Baker, Flint Beverage, Diane Ciesla	
J U L Y	22	Captain America: The First Avenger	Paramount Pictures / Marvel Studios	Joe Johnston (director); Christopher Markus, Stephen McFeely (screenplay); Chris Evans, Tommy Lee Jones, Hugo Weaving, Hayley Atwell, Sebastian Stan, Dominic Cooper, Neal McDonough, Derek Luke, Stanley Tucci, Richard Armitage, Samuel L. Jackson, Toby Jones, Kenneth Choi, JJ Feild, Natalie Dormer, William Hope, David Bradley, Simon Kunz, Laura Haddock, Amanda Righetti, Spencer Garrett, Stan Lee, Lex Shrapnel, Amanda Walker, Bruno Ricci, Michael Brandon, Nicholas Pinnock, Marek Oravec, Sam Hoare, Jenna Coleman, Sophie Colquhoun, Doug Cockle, Ben Batt, Katherine Press, Anatole Taubman, Erich Redman, James Payton, Ronan Raftery, Nick Hendrix, Luke Allen-Gale, Colin Stinton	
J U L Y	22	Friends with Benefits	Screen Gems / Castle Rock Entertainment	Will Gluck (director/screenplay); Harley Peyton, Keith Merryman, David A. Newman (screenplay); Justin Timberlake, Mila Kunis, Patricia Clarkson, Jenna Elfman, Bryan Greenberg, Richard Jenkins, Woody Harrelson, Andy Samberg, Nolan Gould, Shaun White, Andrew Fleming, Catherine Reitman, Courtney Henggeler, Masi Oka, Tiya Sircar, Emma Stone, Lili Mirojnick, Angelique Cabral, Rashida Jones, Jason Segel	
J U L Y	29	Cowboys & Aliens	Universal Pictures / DreamWorks Pictures / Reliance Entertainment / Relativity Media / Imagine Entertainment	Jon Favreau (director); Roberto Orci, Alex Kurtzman, Damon Lindelof, Mark Fergus, Hawk Ostby (screenplay); Daniel Craig, Harrison Ford, Olivia Wilde, Sam Rockwell, Paul Dano, Clancy Brown, Keith Carradine, Noah Ringer, Adam Beach, Abigail Spencer, Ana de la Reguera, Walton Goggins, Julio Cedillo, David O'Hara, Toby Huss, Raoul Trujillo, Chris Browning, Paul Ortega	
J U L Y	29	Crazy, Stupid, Love	Warner Bros. Pictures	John Requa, Glenn Ficarra (directors); Dan Fogelman (screenplay); Steve Carell, Julianne Moore, Ryan Gosling, Analeigh Tipton, Emma Stone, Marisa Tomei, Kevin Bacon, John Carroll Lynch, Jonah Bobo, Josh Groban, Liza Lapira, Joey King, Beth Littleford, Julianna Guill, Crystal Reed, Dan Butler	
J U L Y	29	The Smurfs	Columbia Pictures / Sony Pictures Animation / The Kerner Entertainment Company	Raja Gosnell (director); J. David Stem, David N. Weiss, Jay Scherick, David Ronn (screenplay); Neil Patrick Harris, Jayma Mays, Sofía Vergara, Hank Azaria, Tim Gunn, Jonathan Winters, Katy Perry, Alan Cumming, George Lopez, Anton Yelchin, Fred Armisen, John Kassir, Paul Reubens, Kenan Thompson, B. J. Novak, Jeff Foxworthy, Wolfgang Puck, Gary Basaraba, Tom Kane, Frank Welker, John Oliver, Joel McCrary	
A U G U S T	5	Bellflower	Oscilloscope Laboratories	Evan Glodell (director/screenplay); Evan Glodell, Jessie Wiseman, Tyler Dawson, Rebekah Brandes	
A U G U S T	5	The Change-Up	Universal Pictures / Relativity Media	David Dobkin (director); Jon Lucas, Scott Moore (screenplay); Ryan Reynolds, Jason Bateman, Leslie Mann, Olivia Wilde, Alan Arkin, Mircea Monroe, Gregory Itzin, Ned Schmidtke, Craig Bierko, Dax Griffin, Taaffe O'Connell, Fred Stoller, T. J. Hassan, Jeanette Miller	
A U G U S T	5	Phineas and Ferb the Movie: Across the 2nd Dimension	Disney-ABC Domestic Television	Dan Povenmire (director/screenplay); Robert F. Hughes (director); Jon Colton Barry, Jeff "Swampy" Marsh (screenplay); Vincent Martella, Thomas Brodie-Sangster, Ashley Tisdale, Dee Bradley Baker, Dan Povenmire, Jeff "Swampy" Marsh, Tyler Alexander Mann, Mitchel Musso, Alyson Stoner, Caroline Rhea, Richard O'Brien, John Viener, Kevin Michael Richardson, Kelly Hu, Maulik Pancholy, Bobby Gaylor, Jack McBrayer, Jaret Reddick, Carlos Alazraqui, Steve Zahn, Doris Roberts, Slash, Loni Love, Jeff Bennett, Ariel Winter, Todd Stashwick, Olivia Olson, Danny Jacob	
A U G U S T	5	Rise of the Planet of the Apes	20th Century Fox / Dune Entertainment / Chernin Entertainment	Rupert Wyatt (director); Rick Jaffa and Amanda Silver (screenplay); James Franco, Freida Pinto, John Lithgow, Brian Cox, Tom Felton, Andy Serkis, David Oyelowo, Tyler Labine, David Hewlett, Jamie Harris, Chelah Horsdal, Karin Konoval, Terry Notary, Richard Ridings, Devyn Dalton, Jay Caputo, Christopher Gordon	
A U G U S T	10	The Help	Touchstone Pictures / DreamWorks Pictures / Reliance Entertainment / Participant Media / Imagenation Abu Dhabi / 1492 Pictures	Tate Taylor (director/screenplay); Emma Stone, Viola Davis, Octavia Spencer, Jessica Chastain, Bryce Dallas Howard, Allison Janney, Ahna O'Reilly, Sissy Spacek, Chris Lowell, Mike Vogel, Wes Chatham, Cicely Tyson, Anna Camp, Ashley Johnson, Brian Kerwin, Aunjanue Ellis, Mary Steenburgen, Leslie Jordan, David Oyelowo, Dana Ivey	
A U G U S T	12	30 Minutes or Less	Columbia Pictures / Media Rights Capital	Ruben Fleischer (director); Michael Diliberti, Matthew Sullivan (screenplay); Jesse Eisenberg, Aziz Ansari, Danny McBride, Nick Swardson, Dilshad Vadsaria, Michael Peña, Bianca Kajlich, Fred Ward, Brett Gelman	
A U G U S T	12	Final Destination 5	Warner Bros. Pictures / New Line Cinema	Steven Quale (director); Eric Heisserer (screenplay); Nicholas D'Agosto, Emma Bell, Miles Fisher, Arlen Escarpeta, David Koechner, Tony Todd, Jacqueline MacInnes Wood, P.J. Byrne, Courtney B. Vance, Brent Stait, Barclay Hope, Chasty Ballesteros, Mike Dopud, Ellen Wroe, Roman Podhora, Jasmin Dring	
A U G U S T	12	Glee: The 3D Concert Movie	20th Century Fox	Kevin Tancharoen (director); Dianna Agron, Chris Colfer, Darren Criss, Kevin McHale, Lea Michele, Cory Monteith, Heather Morris, Amber Riley, Naya Rivera, Mark Salling, Jenna Ushkowitz, Harry Shum Jr., Chord Overstreet, Ashley Fink	
A U G U S T	18	The Idiotmaker's Gravity Tour	ConFluence-Film	Daniel Kremer (director); Daniel Kremer, William Cully Allen (writer); William Cully Allen, Glenn Walsh, K.J. Linhein, Pappu Rai, Peter Brunette, William McKeever, Julie Edelstein	
A U G U S T	19	Conan the Barbarian	Lionsgate / Millennium Films / Paradox Entertainment	Marcus Nispel (director); Thomas Dean Donnelly, Joshua Oppenheimer, Sean Hood (screenplay); Jason Momoa, Rachel Nichols, Stephen Lang, Rose McGowan, Saïd Taghmaoui, Leo Howard, Bob Sapp, Ron Perlman, Steven O'Donnell, Nonso Anozie, Gisella Marengo, Laila Rouass, Alina Pușcău, Morgan Freeman, Diana Lubenova, Milton Welsh, Raad Rawi, Anton Trendafilov, Ivana Staneva	
A U G U S T	19	Flypaper	Foresight Unlimited / The Safran Company	Rob Minkoff (director); Patrick Dempsey, Ashley Judd	
A U G U S T	19	Fright Night	Touchstone Pictures / DreamWorks Pictures / Reliance Entertainment	Craig Gillespie (director); Marti Noxon (screenplay); Anton Yelchin, Colin Farrell, Christopher Mintz-Plasse, David Tennant, Imogen Poots, Toni Collette, Dave Franco, Reid Ewing, Will Denton, Sandra Vergara, Lisa Loeb, Brian Huskey, Grace Phipps, Chris Sarandon, Dee Bradley Baker	Remake of 1985 film
A U G U S T	19	One Day	Focus Features / Random House Films / Film4 Productions	Lone Scherfig (director); David Nicholls (screenplay); Anne Hathaway, Jim Sturgess, Patricia Clarkson, Rafe Spall, Ken Stott, Romola Garai, Jodie Whittaker, Tom Mison, Jamie Sives, Toby Regbo, Georgia King, Matt Berry, Matthew Beard, Heida Reed, Amanda Fairbank Hynes	
A U G U S T	19	Spy Kids: All the Time in the World	Dimension Films / Troublemaker Studios	Robert Rodriguez (director/screenplay); Jessica Alba, Joel McHale, Alexa Vega, Daryl Sabara, Rowan Blanchard, Mason Cook, Ricky Gervais, Jeremy Piven, Danny Trejo, Angela Lanza	
A U G U S T	26	Higher Ground	Sony Pictures Classics	Vera Farmiga (director); Carolyn S. Briggs, Tim Metcalfe (screenplay); Vera Farmiga, Joshua Leonard, Bill Irwin, Donna Murphy, Norbert Leo Butz, John Hawkes, Dagamara Domińczyk, Ebon Moss-Bachrach	
A U G U S T	26	Our Idiot Brother	Big Beach Films / Likely Story	Jesse Peretz (director): Evgenia Peretz, David Schisgall (screenplay); Paul Rudd, Elizabeth Banks, Zooey Deschanel, Emily Mortimer, Steve Coogan, Hugh Dancy, Kathryn Hahn, Rashida Jones, Shirley Knight, T.J. Miller, Adam Scott	
S E P T E M B E R	2	Apollo 18	Dimension Films	Gonzalo López-Gallego (director); Brian Miller (screenplay)	
S E P T E M B E R	2	Seven Days in Utopia	Utopia Films	Matt Russell (director/screenplay); David L. Cook, Rob Levine, Sandra Thrift (screenplay); Lucas Black, Robert Duvall, Melissa Leo	
S E P T E M B E R	2	Shark Night	Relativity Media / Rogue Pictures	David R. Ellis (director); Jesse Studenberg, Will Hayes (screenplay); Sara Paxton, Dustin Milligan, Chris Carmack, Katharine McPhee, Donal Logue, Joshua Leonard, Joel David Moore, Sinqua Walls, Alyssa Diaz, Chris Zylka	
S E P T E M B E R	9	Bucky Larson: Born to Be a Star	Columbia Pictures / Happy Madison Productions	Tom Brady (director); Adam Sandler, Allen Covert, Nick Swardson (screenplay); Nick Swardson, Christina Ricci, Stephen Dorff, Don Johnson, Ido Mosseri, Kevin Nealon, Edward Herrmann, Miriam Flynn, Mario Joyner, Nick Turturro, Mary Pat Gleason, Curtis Armstrong, Brandon Hardesty, Adam Herschman, Pauly Shore, Beverly Polcyn, Jonathan Loughran, Peter Dante, Pasha Lychnikoff, Jimmy Fallon, Joey Diaz	
S E P T E M B E R	9	Contagion	Warner Bros. Pictures / Participant Media / Imagenation Abu Dhabi	Steven Soderbergh (director); Scott Z. Burns (screenplay); Marion Cotillard, Matt Damon, Laurence Fishburne, Jude Law, Gwyneth Paltrow, Kate Winslet, Bryan Cranston, Jennifer Ehle, Elliott Gould, Chin Han, John Hawkes, Josie Ho, Sanaa Lathan, Demetri Martin, Armin Rohde, Enrico Colantoni, Monique Gabriela Curnen	
S E P T E M B E R	9	Warrior	Lionsgate	Gavin O'Connor (director/screenplay); Anthony Tambakis, Cliff Dorfman (screenplay); Joel Edgerton, Tom Hardy, Jennifer Morrison, Nick Nolte, Frank Grillo, Kevin Dunn, Noah Emmerich, Denzel Whitaker, Maximiliano Hernández, Fernando Chien, Kurt Angle, Erik Apple, Nate Marquardt, Anthony Johnson, Roan Carneiro, Yves Edwards, Gavin O'Connor, Jake McLaughlin, Amir Perets, Dan Caldwell, Bryan Callen, Rashad Evans, Vanessa Martinez, Laura Chinn, Capri Thomas, Lexi Cowan, Carlos Miranda, Nick Lehane, Charlie Smith	
S E P T E M B E R	16	Drive	FilmDistrict	Nicolas Winding Refn (director/screenplay); Hossein Amini (screenplay); Ryan Gosling, Carey Mulligan, Bryan Cranston, Ron Perlman, Albert Brooks, Christina Hendricks, Oscar Isaac, James Biberi, Russ Tamblyn, John Pyper-Ferguson, Joe Pingue, Ralph Lawler, Laurene Landon	
S E P T E M B E R	16	I Don't Know How She Does It	The Weinstein Company	Douglas McGrath (director); Aline Brosh McKenna (screenplay); Sarah Jessica Parker, Pierce Brosnan, Greg Kinnear, Christina Hendricks, Olivia Munn, Busy Philipps, Kelsey Grammer, Seth Meyers, Jane Curtin, Mark Blum, Sarah Shahi, Jessica Szohr, Emma Rayne Lyle, Mika Brzezinski, Eugenia Yuan, Michelle Hurst, Beth Fowler, Marceline Hugot, Natalie Gold	
S E P T E M B E R	16	The Lion King in 3D	Walt Disney Pictures	Roger Allers, Rob Minkoff (director); Irene Mecchi, Jonathan Roberts, Linda Woolverton (screenplay); Matthew Broderick, James Earl Jones, Jeremy Irons, Jonathan Taylor Thomas, Moira Kelly, Nathan Lane, Ernie Sabella, Rowan Atkinson, Robert Guillaume, Madge Sinclair, Whoopi Goldberg, Cheech Marin, Jim Cummings	
S E P T E M B E R	16	Restless	Sony Pictures Classics / Imagine Entertainment	Gus Van Sant (director); Jason Lew (screenplay); Henry Hopper, Mia Wasikowska, Ryō Kase, Schuyler Fisk, Jane Adams, Chin Han, Lusia Strus	
S E P T E M B E R	16	Straw Dogs	Screen Gems	Rod Lurie (director/screenplay); James Marsden, Kate Bosworth, Alexander Skarsgård, Dominic Purcell, James Woods, Willa Holland, Laz Alonso, Rhys Coiro, Billy Lush, Walton Goggins, Anson Mount, Drew Powell, Rod Lurie	Remake of 1971 film
S E P T E M B E R	20	Setup	Lionsgate	Mike Gunther (director/screenplay); Mike Behrman (screenplay); 50 Cent, Bruce Willis, Ryan Phillippe, Jenna Dewan, Randy Couture, Will Yun Lee, Shaun Toub, Rory Markham, Jay Karnes, James Remar	
S E P T E M B E R	20	Spooky Buddies	Walt Disney Studios Home Entertainment / Key Pix Productions	Robert Vince (director/screenplay); Anna McRoberts (screenplay); Harland Williams, Rance Howard, Pat Finn, Jennifer Elise Cox, Skyler Gisondo, Sierra McCormick, Elisa Donovan, Tucker Albrizzi, Frank C. Turner, G. Hannelius, Ty Panitz, Diedrich Bader, Ryan Stiles, Tim Conway, Debra Jo Rupp, Frankie Jonas, Dylan Sprayberry, Max Charles, Sage Ryan, Jake Johnson, Michael Teigen, Hardy Gatlin, Nico Ghisi, Charles Henry Wyson	
S E P T E M B E R	23	Abduction	Lionsgate	John Singleton (director); Shawn Christensen, Jeffrey Nachmanoff (screenplay); Taylor Lautner, Lily Collins, Alfred Molina, Jason Isaacs, Maria Bello, Sigourney Weaver, Michael Nyqvist, Dermot Mulroney, Nickola Shreli, Elisabeth Röhm, Antonique Smith, Denzel Whitaker, Ilia Volok, Tim Griffin, Emily Peachey, William Peltz, Victor Slezak, Roger Guenveur Smith	
S E P T E M B E R	23	Dolphin Tale	Warner Bros. Pictures / Alcon Entertainment	Charles Martin Smith (director); Karen Janszen, Noam Dromi (screenplay); Harry Connick Jr., Ashley Judd, Morgan Freeman, Nathan Gamble, Kris Kristofferson, Austin Stowell, Cozi Zuehlsdorff, Frances Sternhagen, Austin Highsmith, Juliana Harkavy, Jim Fitzpatrick, Kim Ostrenko, Richard Libertini, Ray McKinnon, Marc Macaulay, Kurt Yaeger, Mike Pniewski, Betsy Landin, Megan Lozicki, Michael Roark, Ashley White, Tom Nowicki, Rus Blackwell	
S E P T E M B E R	23	Killer Elite	Open Road Films	Gary McKendry (director/screenplay); Matt Sherring (screenplay); Clive Owen, Jason Statham, Robert De Niro, Dominic Purcell, Yvonne Strahovski, Adewale Akinnuoye-Agbaje, Aden Young, Ben Mendelsohn, Matt Nable, Lachy Hulme, Firass Dirani, Nick Tate, Bille Brown, Grant Bowler, Michael Dorman, Andrew Stehlin, Simon Armstrong, Michael Carman, Rodney Afif	
S E P T E M B E R	23	Moneyball	Columbia Pictures / Plan B Entertainment	Bennett Miller (director); Aaron Sorkin, Steve Zaillian (screenplay); Brad Pitt, Jonah Hill, Robin Wright Penn, Philip Seymour Hoffman, Stephen Bishop, Kathryn Morris, Chris Pratt, Reed Diamond, Brent Jennings, Ken Medlock, Tammy Blanchard, Jack McGee, Vyto Ruginis, Nick Searcy, Glenn Morshower, Casey Bond, Kerris Dorsey, Arliss Howard, Derrin Ebert, Takayo Fischer, Adrian Bellani, Royce Clayton, Spike Jonze, Bobby Kotick, Lisa Guerrero, Joe Satriani, Simon James, Greg Papa, Bob Costas, Tim McCarver, Eddie Frierson, Ed Montague, Johnny Damon, Joe DiMaggio, Lou Gehrig, Jason Giambi, Rudy Giuliani, Babe Ruth	
S E P T E M B E R	30	50/50	Summit Entertainment / Mandate Pictures	Jonathan Levine (director); Will Reiser (screenplay); Joseph Gordon-Levitt, Seth Rogen, Anna Kendrick, Bryce Dallas Howard, Anjelica Huston, Serge Houde, Andrew Airlie, Matt Frewer, Philip Baker Hall, Sugar Lyn Beard, Yee Jee Tso, Sarah Smyth, Peter Kelamis, Jessica Parker Kennedy, Laura Bertram, Luisa D'Oliveira, Veena Sood, Marie Avgeropoulos, Andrea Brooks, Will Reiser, Stephen Colbert, D.C. Douglas	
S E P T E M B E R	30	Courageous	TriStar Pictures	Alex Kendrick (director/screenplay); Stephen Kendrick (screenplay); Alex Kendrick, Kevin Downes, Ken Bevel, Ben Davies, Matt Hardwick, Ed Litton	
S E P T E M B E R	30	Dream House	Universal Pictures / Morgan Creek Productions	Jim Sheridan (director); David Loucka (screenplay); Daniel Craig, Rachel Weisz, Naomi Watts, Marton Csokas, Rachel G. Fox, Elias Koteas, Jane Alexander, Martin Roach, Brian Murray, Claire Geare, Taylor Geare	
S E P T E M B E R	30	Margaret	Fox Searchlight Pictures	Kenneth Lonergan (director/screenplay); Anna Paquin, J. Smith-Cameron, Matt Damon, Mark Ruffalo, Matthew Broderick, Jean Reno, Jeannie Berlin, Allison Janney, Kieran Culkin, Sarah Steele, John Gallagher Jr., Stephen Adly Guirgis, Betsy Aidem, Jonathan Hadary, T. Scott Cunningham, Josh Hamilton, Rosemarie DeWitt, Olivia Thirlby, Kenneth Lonergan, Michael Ealy, Adam LeFevre, Krysten Ritter, Matthew Bush	
S E P T E M B E R	30	Take Shelter	Sony Pictures Classics	Jeff Nichols (director/screenplay); Michael Shannon, Jessica Chastain, Shea Whigham, Katy Mixon, Ray McKinnon, LisaGay Hamilton, Kathy Baker, Robert Longstreet	
S E P T E M B E R	30	What's Your Number?	20th Century Fox / Regency Enterprises	Mark Mylod (director); Jennifer Crittenden, Gabrielle Allan (screenplay); Anna Faris, Chris Evans, Ari Graynor, Blythe Danner, Ed Begley Jr., Oliver Jackson-Cohen, Dave Annable, Heather Burns, Eliza Coupe, Tika Sumpter, Joel McHale, Chris Pratt, Denise Vasi, Zachary Quinto, Mike Vogel, Martin Freeman, Andy Samberg, Thomas Lennon, Anthony Mackie, Ivana Miličević, Aziz Ansari	

== October–December ==
Opening		Title	Production company	Cast and crew	Ref.
O C T O B E R	5	George Harrison: Living in the Material World	HBO Films	Martin Scorsese (director); Olivia Harrison	
O C T O B E R	7	The Ides of March	Columbia Pictures / Cross Creek Pictures	George Clooney (director/screenplay); Grant Heslov, Beau Willimon (screenplay); Ryan Gosling, George Clooney, Philip Seymour Hoffman, Paul Giamatti, Marisa Tomei, Evan Rachel Wood, Jeffrey Wright, Max Minghella, Jennifer Ehle, Gregory Itzin, Michael Mantell, Rachel Maddow, Chris Matthews, Charlie Rose	
O C T O B E R	7	Real Steel	Touchstone Pictures / DreamWorks Pictures / Reliance Entertainment	Shawn Levy (director); John Gatins (screenplay); Hugh Jackman, Kevin Durand, Evangeline Lilly, Anthony Mackie, Dakota Goyo, Olga Fonda, Karl Yune, James Rebhorn, Hope Davis, John Gatins, David Alan Basche, Phil LaMarr	
O C T O B E R	7	The Way	Producers Distribution Agency	Emilio Estevez (director/screenplay); Martin Sheen, Deborah Kara Unger, James Nesbitt, Yorick van Wageningen, Emilio Estevez, Tchéky Karyo, Matt Clark, Renée Estevez, David Alexanian, Spencer Garrett, Ángela Molina, Simón Andreu, Carlos Leal, Antonio Gil	
O C T O B E R	14	The Big Year	20th Century Fox	David Frankel (director); Howard Franklin (screenplay); Jack Black, Steve Martin, Owen Wilson, Rashida Jones, Anjelica Huston, Jim Parsons, Rosamund Pike, JoBeth Williams, Brian Dennehy, Dianne Wiest, Anthony Anderson, Tim Blake Nelson, Joel McHale, Calum Worthy, Veena Sood, Corbin Bernsen, Jesse Moss, Kevin Pollak, Barry Shabaka Henley, Andrew Wilson, Al Roker, John Cleese, June Squibb, Steven Weber	
O C T O B E R	14	Footloose	Paramount Pictures / MTV Films / Spyglass Entertainment	Craig Brewer (director/screenplay); Dean Pitchford (screenplay); Kenny Wormald, Julianne Hough, Andie MacDowell, Dennis Quaid, Miles Teller, Ser'Darius Blain, Patrick John Flueger, Ray McKinnon, Kim Dickens, Brett Rice, Maggie Elizabeth Jones, Josh Warren, Jayson Warner Smith, Mary-Charles Jones, Ziah Colon	Remake of 1984 film
O C T O B E R	14	The Thing	Universal Pictures / Morgan Creek Productions	Matthijs van Heijningen (director); Ronald D. Moore, Eric Heisserer (screenplay); Mary Elizabeth Winstead, Adewale Akinnuoye-Agbaje, Joel Edgerton, Jonathan Lloyd Walker, Ulrich Thomsen, Eric Christian Olsen, Paul Braunstein, Trond Espen Seim, Jørgen Langhelle, Jan Gunnar Røise, Stig Henrik Hoff, Kristofer Hivju, Carsten Bjørnlund	Remake of 1982 film
O C T O B E R	21	Johnny English Reborn	Universal Pictures / StudioCanal / Relativity Media / Working Title Films	Oliver Parker (director); Hamish McColl, William Davies (screenplay); Rowan Atkinson, Daniel Kaluuya, Rosamund Pike, Dominic West, Gillian Anderson, Richard Schiff, Tim McInnerny, Pik-Sen Lim, Stephen Campbell Moore, Burn Gorman, Togo Igawa, Mark Ivanir, Benedict Wong, Joséphine de La Baume, Rupert Vansittart, Miles Jupp, Ben Miller	
O C T O B E R	21	Margin Call	Lionsgate / Roadside Attractions	J. C. Chandor (director/screenplay); Kevin Spacey, Paul Bettany, Jeremy Irons, Zachary Quinto, Penn Badgley, Simon Baker, Mary McDonnell, Demi Moore, Stanley Tucci, Aasif Mandvi, Ashley Williams, Susan Blackwell, Maria Dizzia, Al Sapienza	
O C T O B E R	21	Paranormal Activity 3	Paramount Pictures / Blumhouse Productions	Henry Joost, Ariel Schulman (directors); Christopher B. Landon (screenplay); Lauren Bittner, Chris Smith, Chloe Csengery, Jessica Tyler Brown, Dustin Ingram, Hallie Foote, Johanna Braddy, Maria Olsen, Katie Featherston, Sprague Grayden, Brian Boland, Bailey Brown	
O C T O B E R	21	The Three Musketeers	Summit Entertainment / Constantin Film	Paul W. S. Anderson (director); Andrew Davies, Alex Litvalk (screenplay); Matthew Macfadyen, Logan Lerman, Ray Stevenson, Luke Evans, Milla Jovovich, Orlando Bloom, Christoph Waltz, Mads Mikkelsen, Gabriella Wilde, James Corden, Juno Temple, Freddie Fox, Til Schweiger, Carsten Nørgaard, Nina Eichinger, Sara Evans	
O C T O B E R	21	Martha Marcy May Marlene	Fox Searchlight Pictures	Sean Durkin (director/screenplay); Elizabeth Olsen, John Hawkes, Sarah Paulson, Hugh Dancy, Brady Corbet, Christopher Abbott, Maria Dizzia, Julia Garner, Louisa Krause, Adam David Thompson, Tobias Segal	
O C T O B E R	28	Anonymous	Columbia Pictures / Relativity Media	Roland Emmerich (director); John Orloff (screenplay); Rhys Ifans, Vanessa Redgrave, Joely Richardson, David Thewlis, Xavier Samuel, Sebastian Armesto, Rafe Spall, Edward Hogg, Jamie Campbell Bower, Derek Jacobi, Sam Reid, Paolo De Vita, Trystan Gravelle, Robert Emms, Tony Way, Alex Hassell, Mark Rylance, Helen Baxendale, Vicky Krieps, John Keogh, Lloyd Hutchinson, Amy Kwolek	
O C T O B E R	28	In Time	20th Century Fox / Regency Enterprises	Andrew Niccol (director/screenplay); Justin Timberlake, Amanda Seyfried, Cillian Murphy, Alex Pettyfer, Vincent Kartheiser, Olivia Wilde, Matt Bomer, Johnny Galecki, Collins Pennie, Ethan Peck, Yaya DaCosta, Rachel Roberts, August Emerson, Sasha Pivovarova, Jesse Lee Soffer, Bella Heathcote, Toby Hemingway, Melissa Ordway, Jessica Parker Kennedy, Jeff Staron, Matt O'Leary, Nick Lashaway, Ray Santiago, Kris Lemche, Laura Ashley Samuels	
O C T O B E R	28	Like Crazy	Paramount Vantage	Drake Doremus (director/screenplay); Ben York Jones (screenplay); Anton Yelchin, Felicity Jones, Jennifer Lawrence, Charlie Bewley, Finola Hughes, Oliver Muirhead, Alex Kingston, Keeley Hazell, Chris Messina, Ben York Jones, Jamie Thomas King	
O C T O B E R	28	October Baby	Samuel Goldwyn Films / Provident Films	Andrew Erwin and Jon Erwin (director/screenplay); Rachel Hendrix, Jason Burkey, John Schneider, Jasmine Guy	
O C T O B E R	28	Puss in Boots	Paramount Pictures / DreamWorks Animation	Chris Miller (director/screenplay); Tom Wheeler (screenplay); Antonio Banderas, Salma Hayek, Zach Galifianakis, Billy Bob Thornton, Amy Sedaris, Constance Marie, Mike Mitchell, Guillermo del Toro, Chris Miller, Tom Wheeler, Conrad Vernon, Tom McGrath, Bob Joles, Bob Persichetti, Lara Jill Miller, Joshua Rush	
O C T O B E R	28	The Rum Diary	FilmDistrict	Bruce Robinson (director/screenplay); Johnny Depp, Amber Heard, Aaron Eckhart, Giovanni Ribisi, Michael Rispoli, Richard Jenkins, Amaury Nolasco, Marshall Bell, Bill Smitrovich, Julian Holloway, Karen Austin, Jason Smith, Karimah Westbrook	
N O V E M B E R	4	Tower Heist	Universal Pictures / Imagine Entertainment	Brett Ratner (director); Ted Griffin, Jeff Nathanson (screenplay); Ben Stiller, Eddie Murphy, Casey Affleck, Alan Alda, Matthew Broderick, Téa Leoni, Michael Peña, Gabourey Sidibe, Judd Hirsch, Stephen McKinley Henderson, Nina Arianda, Marcia Jean Kurtz, James Colby, Željko Ivanek, Robert Downey Sr., Kate Upton, Jessica Szohr, Dwight "Heavy D" Myers	
N O V E M B E R	4	A Very Harold & Kumar 3D Christmas	Warner Bros. Pictures / New Line Cinema / Mandate Pictures	Todd Strauss-Schulson (director); Jon Hurwitz, Hayden Schlossberg (screenplay); John Cho, Kal Penn, Neil Patrick Harris, Danneel Harris, Paula Garcés, Danny Trejo, Amir Blumenfeld, Elias Koteas, Thomas Lennon, Patton Oswalt, Eddie Kaye Thomas, David Krumholtz, Richard Riehle, Jordan Hinson, John Hoogenakker, Jake Johnson, Bobby Lee, Yasen Peyankov, Melissa Gaston, RZA, Da'Vone McDonald, Brett Gelman, Dana DeLorenzo, David Burtka, Dan Levy	
N O V E M B E R	11	Immortals	Relativity Media	Tarsem Singh (director); Charlie Parlapanides, Vlas Parlapanides (screenplay); Henry Cavill, Stephen Dorff, Luke Evans, Isabel Lucas, Kellan Lutz, Freida Pinto, Mickey Rourke, Joseph Morgan, Daniel Sharman, Peter Stebbings, Stephen McHattie, Greg Bryk, Alan van Sprang, John Hurt, Robert Maillet, Kaniehtiio Horn, Ayisha Issa, Corey Sevier, Steve Byers, Mark Margolis	
N O V E M B E R	11	J. Edgar	Warner Bros. Pictures / Imagine Entertainment	Clint Eastwood (director); Dustin Lance Black (screenplay); Leonardo DiCaprio, Armie Hammer, Naomi Watts, Josh Lucas, Judi Dench, Ed Westwick, Dermot Mulroney, Jeffrey Donovan, Denis O'Hare, Stephen Root, Damon Herriman, Lea Thompson, Ken Howard, Josh Hamilton, Jessica Hecht, Geoff Pierson, Michael O'Neill, Josh Stamberg, Zach Grenier, Christopher Shyer, Michael Rady, Miles Fisher, Adam Driver, Kyle Eastwood, Kye Palmer, Michael Gladis, Amanda Schull, Gunner Wright, Kaitlyn Dever, Jack Donner, Jordan Bridges, Christian Clemenson, Geoff Stults, Sadie Calvano, Ryan McPartlin, Kahil Dotay, David Clennon, Manu Intiraymi, Emily Alyn Lind, Gerald Downey, Austin Basis, Eric Matheny, Aaron Lazar, Maxine Weldon	
N O V E M B E R	11	Jack and Jill	Columbia Pictures / Happy Madison Productions	Dennis Dugan (director); Steve Koren, Adam Sandler, Robert Smigel (screenplay); Adam Sandler, Katie Holmes, Al Pacino, Eugenio Derbez, Tim Meadows, Santiago Segura, Nick Swardson, Allen Covert, Rohan Chand, Elodie Tougne, Geoff Pierson, Valerie Mahaffey, Gad Elmaleh, Gary Valentine, Kristin Davis, Norm Macdonald, Dana Carvey, David Spade, Jonathan Loughran, Peter Dante, Tyler Spindel, Owen Benjamin, John Farley, Dennis Dugan, Richard Kline, Luis Fernandez-Gil, Ruben Rabasa, George Gray, Manuela Arbeláez, Gwendolyn Osborne, Anna Mathias, Lawrence Tanter, Sadie Sandler, Sunny Sandler, Johnny Depp, Regis Philbin, Dan Patrick, Shaquille O'Neal, Drew Carey, John McEnroe, Christie Brinkley, Bill Romanowski, Michael Irvin, Jared Fogle, Billy Blanks, Vince Offer, Caitlyn Jenner	
N O V E M B E R	18	The Descendants	Fox Searchlight Pictures	Alexander Payne (director/screenplay); Nat Faxon, Jim Rash (screenplay); George Clooney, Shailene Woodley, Beau Bridges, Judy Greer, Matthew Lillard, Robert Forster, Amara Miller, Nick Krause, Patricia Hastie, Mary Birdsong, Rob Huebel, Milt Kogan, Laird Hamilton, Michael Ontkean, Matt Corboy	
N O V E M B E R	18	Happy Feet Two	Warner Bros. Pictures / Village Roadshow Pictures	George Miller (director/screenplay); Gary Eck, Warren Coleman, Paul Livingston (screenplay); Elijah Wood, Robin Williams, Hank Azaria, Brad Pitt, Matt Damon, Pink, Sofía Vergara, Common, Hugo Weaving, Richard Carter, Magda Szubanski, Anthony LaPaglia, Ava Acres, Meibh Campbell, Benjamin "Lil' P-Nut" Flores Jr., E.G. Daily, Danny Mann, Carlos Alazraqui, Johnny A. Sanchez, Lombardo Boyar, Jeff Garcia, Lee Perry, Roger Narayan, Gary Eck, Robin Atkin Downes, Sarah Aubrey, Catherine Cavadini, Rob Coleman, Mason Vale Cotton, John DeMita, Charlie Finn, Pat Fraley, Moira Quirk	
N O V E M B E R	18	The Twilight Saga: Breaking Dawn – Part 1	Summit Entertainment	Bill Condon (director); Melissa Rosenberg (screenplay); Kristen Stewart, Robert Pattinson, Taylor Lautner, Billy Burke, Peter Facinelli, Elizabeth Reaser, Ashley Greene, Kellan Lutz, Jackson Rathbone, Nikki Reed, Gil Birmingham, Anna Kendrick, Michael Welch, Christian Serratos, Justin Chon, Sarah Clarke, Julia Jones, Booboo Stewart, MyAnna Buring, Maggie Grace, Casey LaBow, Michael Sheen, Jamie Campbell Bower, Christopher Heyerdahl, Chaske Spencer, Mackenzie Foy, Christian Camargo, Mía Maestro, Olga Fonda, Stephenie Meyer	
N O V E M B E R	23	Arthur Christmas	Columbia Pictures / Sony Pictures Animation / Aardman Animations	Sarah Smith (director/screenplay); Barry Cook (director); Peter Baynham (screenplay); James McAvoy, Hugh Laurie, Bill Nighy, Jim Broadbent, Imelda Staunton, Ashley Jensen, Marc Wootton, Laura Linney, Eva Longoria, Ramona Marquez, Michael Palin, Jerry Lambert, Ryan Patrick Donohue, Sanjeev Bhaskar, Robbie Coltrane, Joan Cusack, Rhys Darby, Jane Horrocks, Iain McKee, Andy Serkis, Dominic West, Rich Fulcher, Kris Pearn, Kevin Cecil, Stewart Lee, Peter Baynham, Danny John-Jules, Adam Tandy, Bronagh Gallagher, Kevin Eldon, Cody Cameron, Emma Kennedy	
N O V E M B E R	23	Hugo	Paramount Pictures / GK Films	Martin Scorsese (director); John Logan (screenplay); Ben Kingsley, Sacha Baron Cohen, Asa Butterfield, Chloë Grace Moretz, Jude Law, Ray Winstone, Emily Mortimer, Helen McCrory, Michael Stuhlbarg, Christopher Lee, Frances de la Tour, Richard Griffiths, Kevin Eldon, Gulliver McGrath, Angus Barnett, Ben Addis, Michael Pitt, Martin Scorsese, Brian Selznick	
N O V E M B E R	23	The Muppets	Walt Disney Pictures	James Bobin (director); Jason Segel, Nicholas Stoller (screenplay); Jason Segel, Amy Adams, Chris Cooper, Rashida Jones, Steve Whitmire, Eric Jacobson, Dave Goelz, Bill Barretta, David Rudman, Matt Vogel, Peter Linz, Alan Arkin, Bill Cobbs, Zach Galifianakis, Ken Jeong, Jim Parsons, Eddie Pepitone, Kristen Schaal, Sarah Silverman, Eddie "Piolin" Sotelo, Donald Glover, Justin Tinucci, Aria Noelle Curzon, Emily Blunt, James Carville, Leslie Feist, Whoopi Goldberg, Selena Gomez, Dave Grohl, Neil Patrick Harris, Judd Hirsch, John Krasinski, Rico Rodriguez, Mickey Rooney, Tyler Bunch, Bruce Lanoil, Michelan Sisti, Paul McGinnis, Greg Ballora, David Alan Barclay, Tim Blaney, Kevin Carlson, Leslie Carrara-Rudolph, Alice Dinnean, Tanya Haden, Karen Prell, Mike Quinn, Greg Berg, Jack Black, Johnny Cannizzaro, Tonya Kay, Jerry Nelson, Beverly Polcyn, Casey Sander, Karen Strassman, Melissa van der Schyff	
N O V E M B E R	23	My Week with Marilyn	The Weinstein Company	Simon Curtis (director); Adrian Hodges (screenplay); Michelle Williams, Kenneth Branagh, Eddie Redmayne, Emma Watson, Judi Dench, Dominic Cooper, Philip Jackson, Derek Jacobi, Toby Jones, Michael Kitchen, Julia Ormond, Simon Russell Beale, Dougray Scott, Zoë Wanamaker	
D E C E M B E R	9	Catch .44	Anchor Bay Films	Aaron Harvey (director); Aaron Harvey (screenplay); Forest Whitaker, Bruce Willis, Malin Åkerman, Nikki Reed, Deborah Ann Woll, Shea Whigham, Brad Dourif	
D E C E M B E R	9	New Year's Eve	Warner Bros. Pictures / New Line Cinema	Garry Marshall (director); Katherine Fugate (screenplay); Halle Berry, Jessica Biel, Jon Bon Jovi, Abigail Breslin, Chris "Ludacris" Bridges, Robert De Niro, Josh Duhamel, Zac Efron, Héctor Elizondo, Katherine Heigl, Ashton Kutcher, Seth Meyers, Lea Michele, Sarah Jessica Parker, Michelle Pfeiffer, Til Schweiger, Hilary Swank, Sofía Vergara, Carla Gugino, Jake T. Austin, Sarah Paulson, Cary Elwes, Alyssa Milano, Larry Miller, Russell Peters, James Belushi, Matthew Broderick, Cherry Jones, John Lithgow, Joey McIntyre, Katherine McNamara, Nat Wolff, Common, Sean O'Bryan, Jack McGee, Yeardley Smith, Penny Marshall, Drena De Niro, Christine Lakin, Shea Curry, Amar'e Stoudemire, Kathleen Marshall, Matthew Walker, Peter Allen Vogt, Fiona Choi, Mara Davi, Pat Battle, Michael Bloomberg, Ryan Seacrest	
D E C E M B E R	9	The Sitter	20th Century Fox	David Gordon Green (director); Brian Gatewood, Alessandro Tanaka (screenplay); Jonah Hill, Sam Rockwell, Ari Graynor, Max Records, J.B. Smoove, Landry Bender, Kylie Bunbury, Samira Wiley, Alex Wolff, Cliff "Method Man" Smith, Erin Daniels, D.W. Moffett, Jessica Hecht, Bruce Altman, Nicky Katt, Jack Krizmanich, Sean Patrick Doyle, Kevin Hernandez, Grace Aronds, Jane Aronds, Gracie Lawrence	
D E C E M B E R	9	We Need to Talk About Kevin	Oscilloscope Laboratories	Lynne Ramsay (director/screenplay); Rory Kinnear (screenplay); Tilda Swinton, John C. Reilly, Ezra Miller, Ashley Gerasimovich, Siobhan Fallon Hogan, Jasper Newell, Alex Manette, Rocky Duer	
D E C E M B E R	9	Young Adult	Paramount Pictures / Mandate Pictures	Jason Reitman (director); Diablo Cody (screenplay); Charlize Theron, Patrick Wilson, Patton Oswalt, Elizabeth Reaser, Collette Wolfe, Jill Eikenberry, Mary Beth Hurt, Louisa Krause, Hettienne Park, J.K. Simmons	
D E C E M B E R	16	Alvin and the Chipmunks: Chipwrecked	20th Century Fox / Fox 2000 Pictures / Regency Enterprises	Mike Mitchell (director); Jonathan Aibel, Glenn Berger (screenplay); Jason Lee, David Cross, Jenny Slate, Justin Long, Matthew Gray Gubler, Jesse McCartney, Christina Applegate, Anna Faris, Amy Poehler, Ross Bagdasarian Jr., Steve Vining, Alan Tudyk, Janice Karman, Andy Buckley, Tucker Albrizzi, Phyllis Smith	
D E C E M B E R	16	Sherlock Holmes: A Game of Shadows	Warner Bros. Pictures / Village Roadshow Pictures / Silver Pictures	Guy Ritchie (director); Kieran Mulroney, Michele Mulroney (screenplay); Robert Downey Jr., Jude Law, Jared Harris, Eddie Marsan, Noomi Rapace, Stephen Fry, Geraldine James, Rachel McAdams, Kelly Reilly, Paul Anderson, Thierry Neuvic, Fatima Adoum, Wolf Kahler, Affif Ben Badra, William Houston	
D E C E M B E R	16	Mission: Impossible – Ghost Protocol	Paramount Pictures / Skydance Productions / Bad Robot	Brad Bird (director); Josh Appelbaum, André Nemec (screenplay); Tom Cruise, Jeremy Renner, Simon Pegg, Paula Patton, Michael Nyqvist, Vladimir Mashkov, Josh Holloway, Anil Kapoor, Léa Seydoux, Samuli Edelmann, Ivan Shvedoff, Pavel Kříž, Miraj Grbić, Ilia Volok, Tom Wilkinson, Ving Rhames, Michelle Monaghan	
D E C E M B E R	21	The Adventures of Tintin	Paramount Pictures / Columbia Pictures / Nickelodeon Movies / Amblin Entertainment / WingNut Films	Steven Spielberg (director); Steven Moffat, Edgar Wright, Joe Cornish (screenplay); Jamie Bell, Andy Serkis, Daniel Craig, Nick Frost, Simon Pegg, Daniel Mays, Mackenzie Crook, Toby Jones, Gad Elmaleh, Cary Elwes, Tony Curran, Enn Reitel, Phillip Rhys, Mark Ivanir, Sebastian Roché, Joe Starr, Kim Stengel, Sonje Fontag	
D E C E M B E R	21	The Girl with the Dragon Tattoo	Columbia Pictures / Metro-Goldwyn-Mayer	David Fincher (director); Steve Zaillian (screenplay); Daniel Craig, Rooney Mara, Christopher Plummer, Stellan Skarsgård, Steven Berkoff, Robin Wright Penn, Yorick van Wageningen, Joely Richardson, Goran Višnjić, Donald Sumpter, Ulf Friberg, Geraldine James, Embeth Davidtz, Josefin Asplund, Per Myrberg, Arly Jover, Tony Way, Fredrik Dolk, Alan Dale, Leo Bill, Élodie Yung, Joel Kinnaman	
D E C E M B E R	23	In the Land of Blood and Honey	FilmDistrict	Angelina Jolie (director/screenplay); Zana Marjanović, Goran Kostić, Rade Šerbedžija, Vanessa Glodjo, Nikola Đuričko, Branko Đurić, Jelena Jovanova, Ermin Bravo, Goran Jevtić, Miloš Timotijević, Ermin Sijamija, Feđa Štukan, Alma Terzić, Boris Ler, Džana Pinjo, Dolya Gavanski	
D E C E M B E R	23	We Bought a Zoo	20th Century Fox / Vinyl Films	Cameron Crowe (director); Aline Brosh McKenna (screenplay); Matt Damon, Thomas Haden Church, Scarlett Johansson, John Michael Higgins, Patrick Fugit, Elle Fanning, Colin Ford, Maggie Elizabeth Jones, Angus Macfadyen, Carla Gallo, J.B. Smoove, Stéphanie Szostak, Desi Lydic, Peter Riegert, Michael Panes, Dustin Ybarra, Kym Whitley, Crystal the Monkey, Bart the Bear 2	
D E C E M B E R	25	The Darkest Hour	Summit Entertainment / 20th Century Fox / Regency Enterprises	Chris Gorak (director); Les Bohem, Jon Spaihts (screenplay); Emile Hirsch, Olivia Thirlby, Rachael Taylor, Max Minghella, Joel Kinnaman, Gosha Kutsenko, Veronika Vernadskaya, Pyotr Fyodorov, Artur Smolyaninov, Dato Bakhtadze, Nikolay Efremov, Georgiy Gromov, Anna Rudakova	
D E C E M B E R	25	Extremely Loud and Incredibly Close	Warner Bros. Pictures	Stephen Daldry (director); Eric Roth (screenplay); Tom Hanks, Sandra Bullock, Thomas Horn, Max von Sydow, Viola Davis, John Goodman, Jeffrey Wright, Madison Arnold, Zoe Caldwell, Hazelle Goodman, Adrian Martinez, Stephen McKinley Henderson, Stephanie Kurtzuba, Catherine Curtin	
D E C E M B E R	25	War Horse	Touchstone Pictures / DreamWorks Pictures / Reliance Entertainment / Amblin Entertainment / The Kennedy/Marshall Company	Steven Spielberg (director); Lee Hall, Richard Curtis (screenplay); Jeremy Irvine, Emily Watson, David Thewlis, Niels Arestrup, Tom Hiddleston, Toby Kebbell, Peter Mullan, Patrick Kennedy, Benedict Cumberbatch, Céline Buckens, Leonard Carow, David Kross, Matt Milne, Robert Emms, Eddie Marsan, Nicolas Bro, Rainer Bock, Hinnerk Schönemann, Gary Lydon, Geoff Bell, Liam Cunningham, Gerard McSorley, Tony Pitts, Pip Torrens, Philippe Nahon, Julian Wadham, David Dencik, Edward Bennett, Johnny Harris, Tam Dean Burn, Maximilian Brückner, Maggie Ollerenshaw, Michael Ryan	
D E C E M B E R	28	Pariah	Focus Features	Dee Rees (director/screenplay); Adepero Oduye, Aasha Davis, Kim Wayans	

== See also ==
- 2011 in American television
- 2011 in the United States
