= The Idiotmaker's Gravity Tour =

- Film poster
- Directed by: Daniel Kremer
- Written by: Daniel Kremer, William Cully Allen
- Produced by: Erin Lovett Sherman, K.P. Rai
- Starring: William Cully Allen; Glenn Walsh; K.J. Linhein; Pappu Rai; Peter Brunette; William McKeever; Julie Edelstein
- Cinematography: Aaron Hollander
- Edited by: Andrei Litvinov
- Music by: Sam Lassner
- Distributed by: ConFluence-Film
- Release date: August 18, 2011
- Running time: 106 minutes
- Country: United States
- Language: English

The Idiotmaker's Gravity Tour is a 2011 American independent comedy-drama film starring William Cully Allen, Glenn Walsh, K.J. Linhein, Pappu Rai, Peter Brunette, Erin Lovett Sherman, Alanna Blair, William McKeever and written and directed by Daniel Kremer.

== Plot ==
Max Plugin is a jaded but flamboyant relic of the 1960s. In his teens, Max ran away to California, where he met Teschlock, a charismatic ascetic and guru renowned among a small group of young followers. At that time, when Teschlock asked Max to join him and his disciples on an ashram in India, Max declined and returned home. Now, forty years later, at age 57, Max takes a journey to India to find Teschlock's grave-site, and also himself. His adventures in India, and his Castaneda-esque experiences back home, form the heart of this very unusual road movie.

== Production ==
The Idiotmaker's Gravity Tour was filmed predominantly in Varanasi, Uttar Pradesh, India, starting in the fall of 2010, with production ending a little less than a year later, in August 2011. The film was released in September 2011.

== Reception ==
Independent filmmaking icon Rob Nilsson called the film, "a no-budget, do-it-yourself excursion to India from a filmmaker of considerable enterprise and admirable aplomb." Director Daniel Kremer was interviewed for both Around Philly and Philly Broadcaster around the time of the film's release.

== Cast ==
- William Cully Allen as Maxwell Abraham Lowell Plugin
- Glenn Walsh as Amos Ligett
- K.J. Linhein as Mordecai Teschlock
- Pappu Rai as Pappu
- Peter Brunette as Peter Pilot
- Erin Lovett Sherman as Gi
- Julie Edelstein as Nessa
- William McKeever as Walt Sannfield
- Alanna Blair as Megan the Végan
- Beth Grant as Carla
- Taryn Power as Anita
- Catherine Genender as Lily
- Hildy Brooks as Mary
- Jackie O'Brien as Janet (credited as Jacqueline Woolsey)
- Sherry Boucher as Maria (credited as Sherry Boucher-Lytle)
- Savannah Smith Boucher as Eloise
- Aloma Ichinose as Joanna
- Toni Basil as Jackie

== Sources ==
- The Idiotmaker's Gravity Tour at IMDb
