= Tooken =

- Directed by: John Asher
- Written by: John Asher; Cameron Van Hoy
- Starring: Lee Tergesen; Margaret Cho; Lauren Stamile; Ethan Suplee; Donnie Wahlberg; Jenny McCarthy; Lukas Haas; Laura-Leigh
- Music by: Joseph Bauer
- Production company: Elevative Entertainment
- Release date: May 26, 2015
- Running time: 80 minutes
- Country: United States
- Language: English

Tooken is a 2015 American parody film directed by John Asher and starring Lee Tergesen, Margaret Cho, Lauren Stamile and Laura-Leigh and features cameos by Ethan Suplee, Donnie Wahlberg, Akon, Michael Blackson and Jenny McCarthy. The film spoofs the action film genre, focusing mainly on the Taken series.

== Premise ==
An ex-CIA agent who is now a mall security guard discovers that things are being taken from him. He must team up with his mom, also an ex-CIA agent, to defeat his rival and save his family.
