= Christmas Evil =

1980 American slasher film

- Theatrical release poster
- Directed by: Lewis Jackson
- Written by: Lewis Jackson
- Produced by: Burt Kleiner; Pete Kameron
- Starring: Brandon Maggart; Jeffrey DeMunn; Dianne Hull; Andy Fenwick
- Cinematography: Ricardo Aronovich
- Edited by: Linda Leeds; Corky O'Hara
- Music by: Joel Harris; Julia Heyward; Don Christensen
- Production company: Edward R. Pressman Films
- Distributed by: Pan American Pictures
- Release date: November 7, 1980 (Pittsburgh)
- Running time: 92 minutes
- Country: United States
- Language: English
- Budget: $850,000

Christmas Evil (originally titled You Better Watch Out, and also known as Terror in Toyland) is a 1980 American psychological slasher film written and directed by Lewis Jackson and starring Brandon Maggart. The plot follows a deranged man obsessed with Santa Claus who eventually goes on a murderous rampage dressed in a Santa Claus suit. Since its release, it has gained a cult following, including praise and repeated viewings by director John Waters.

While not prosecuted for obscenity, Christmas Evil was seized and confiscated in the United Kingdom under Section 3 of the Obscene Publications Act 1959, during the video nasty panic.

== Plot ==
In suburban New Jersey, on Christmas Eve 1947, Harry Stadling and his brother Phil watch as their father dressed as Santa Claus comes down their chimney, eats the milk and cookies they provided for him, and leaves presents under the tree. Later, when Harry gets out of bed to investigate some noises he heard downstairs, he sees his father still dressed as Santa performing cunnilingus on his mother. Traumatized, Harry rushes up to the attic and cuts his hand with a shard of glass from a shattered snow globe.

Thirty-three years later, an adult Harry works in a low-level management position at the Jolly Dreams toy factory, where his colleagues consider him a "schmuck" and make fun of him. At home, he has taken it upon himself to become the next true Santa: he sleeps in costume, and his apartment is resplendent with Christmas décor. He spies on neighborhood children to see if they are being "good" or "bad" and keeps detailed records of their behavior.

Harry's coworker Frank asks Harry to cover his shift on the assembly line in order to be with his family. However, on his way home from work, Harry sees Frank drinking with friends at a local bar. Distressed by the man's duplicity, Harry breaks one of his dollhouse figures while humming Christmas tunes. The following day, he cancels his yearly Thanksgiving dinner attendance with Phil and his family. Phil has been constantly angered by his brother's odd behavior, while Phil's wife Jackie is more sympathetic.

At the company Christmas party, the owner of Jolly Dreams, Mr. Wiseman, announces that the company will donate toys to the children of the local hospital, provided production increases sufficiently and the employees contribute with their own money. Mr. Fletcher, one of the company's high-ranking executives, introduces Harry to new training executive George Grosch, who devised the donation scheme. Harry is angry and disgusted at both for not really caring about the children. That night, he fills bags with toys he stole from the factory and other bags with dirt.

On Christmas Eve, while glueing a Santa beard to his face, he enters a fugue state that has him convinced that he truly is Santa Claus. Garbed in his Santa suit, Harry starts doing his rounds on the van that he decorated with a sleigh picture, and that he believes to have been trained by Santa Claus's reindeer. He first sneaks into his brother's home and delivers toys for his nephews; then leaves a bagful of dirt at the doorstep of "bad boy" Moss Garcia. Later, Harry drops off toys at the hospital, where he is greeted cheerfully by the staff.

On Midnight Mass, Harry is taunted by Charles, Binky and Peter, who ridicule his appearance. In retaliation, he brutally murders them with a toy soldier and hatchet. Later, Harry is welcomed at a neighborhood Christmas party, where people think he is just some harmless Santa impersonator; he dances and cheers everyone up and makes sure the attending children know they will have to be good boys and girls to receive their gifts. He then breaks into Frank's home, kills him with his sack of gifts and a Christmas tree star, and leaves toys behind for the children. He makes a run for his van just as Frank's wife finds her dead husband.

On Christmas morning, his Santa suit disheveled and dirty, Harry returns to Jolly Dreams and activates the assembly lines, breaking all the toys, which he considers subpar. Later, his van becomes stuck in the snow on a beautifully decorated street with plenty of lights, sending him further into a delusional state. The residents shortly recognize him as the murderer and form a torch-bearing mob to pursue him.

Harry manages to free his van from the snow and drives to Phil's house, where the latter is horrified to discover his brother was the homicidal Santa from the news. During the argument, Harry blames Phil to have been the root cause of his childhood trauma, as Phil was the one who revealed to Harry that Santa Claus was their father. In a fit of rage, Phil chokes his brother unconscious before loading him into the front seat of the van out of remorse. Regaining his consciousness, Harry punches Phil and drives off again, with the latter chases him. The angry mob forces Harry and his van off a bridge; the van is shown to be flying off toward the Moon as a voice-over reads the end of "The Night Before Christmas".

== Cast ==
- Brandon Maggart as Harry Stadling
  - Gus Salud as Young Harry Stadling
- Jeffrey DeMunn as Philip Stadling
  - Wally Moran as Young Philip Stadling
- Dianne Hull as Jackie Stadling
- Andy Fenwick as Dennis Stadling
- Joe Jamrog as Frank Stoller
- Peter Neuman as Moss Garcia
- Mark Chamberlin as Charles
- Scott McKay as Mr. Fletcher
- Peter Friedman as George Grosch
- Burt Kleiner as Mr. Wiseman
- Patricia Richardson as Mrs. Garcia
- Raymond J. Barry as Detective Gleason
- Mark Margolis as Christmas Party Accoster
- Rutanya Alda as Theresa
- Michael Klingher as Peter
- Colleen Zenk as Binky

== Production ==
During production, the film had the working title You Better Watch Out.

=== Filming ===
Principal photography took place in late 1979 and early 1980 in various locations in New Jersey, including Union City, New Brunswick, Edgewater, Englewood, and Montclair. The toy factory featured in the film was a real toy factory in New Brunswick owned by Lynn Pressman, mother of the film's executive producer, Edward R. Pressman; scenes shot at the toy factory were completed in early December 1979, with additional shooting occurring over three days in February 1980.

== Release ==
=== Critical response ===
On review aggregator website Rotten Tomatoes, the film has an approval rating of 57% based on 7 reviews, with an average of 6.5/10. AllMovie gave the film a positive review, complimenting the film's unique editing style, cinematography, music, and sense of humor, concluding, "Christmas Evil is not for all tastes, but it's well worth the time for those looking for a darker, different kind of yuletide film".

Tom Huddleston from Time Out awarded the film a score of 4 out of 5: "In contrast to most slasher flicks, this isn’t about anything as simple as revenge. Jackson’s concerns are bigger: social responsibility, personal morality, and the gaping gulf between society’s stated aims at Christmastime—charity, hope, goodwill to all men—and the plight of those left on the outside: the children, the mentally ill, the ones who don’t fit in. It’s a great-looking film, too: one shot of a suburban street lined with glowing reindeer looks more like Spielbergian sci-fi than low-budget horror. Bizarre, fascinating, thoughtful, and well worth a look".

Dread Central gave the film a mixed review, commending actor Maggart's empathetic performance and the film's ending, but criticized the film's uninventive direction and flaccid pacing.

=== Home media ===
In December 2000, Troma Video released the film as a director's cut version, containing material not seen in the theatrical and 1983 reissue prints. This version is in 4:3 full screen, but is presented in unmatted form showing more vertical information than the theatrical widescreen ratio. Director Jackson later stated that this release "was done under false pretenses. I thought that Troma owned the rights, but of course Troma never does what they say they're going to do. It turned out they'd bought the rights in a fire sale—there was literally a fire, and the people who owned the rights were bankrupt and Troma walked into the rubble and picked up whatever was lying around".

In December 2006, Synapse Films released a Special Edition DVD of Christmas Evil. It features audio commentary from the director and cult filmmaker John Waters, who is quoted as saying it is the "greatest Christmas movie ever made". This version is presented in its matted widescreen ratio of 1.85:1 and is also of the director's cut version.

In December 2014, Vinegar Syndrome released Christmas Evil for the first time ever on Blu-ray in a combo pack with a DVD version. Both discs use a brand new 4K master of the director's cut in widescreen, and carry over the audio commentary tracks from the previous Troma and Synapse Films releases. Supplements such as trailers and deleted scenes between both discs remain the same, while the footage from the audition tapes are exclusive to the DVD version in the combo pack.

== Bibliography ==
- Stine, Scott Aaron (2003). The Gorehound's Guide to Splatter Films of the 1980s. Jefferson, North Carolina: McFarland. ISBN 978-0-786-41532-8.
