= Lucky (2011 film) =

- Theatrical release poster
- Directed by: Gil Cates Jr.
- Written by: Kent Sublette
- Produced by: Gil Cates Jr. Caitlin Murney
- Starring: Colin Hanks; Ari Graynor; Jeffrey Tambor; Ann-Margret; Mimi Rogers
- Cinematography: Darren Genet
- Edited by: Gregory Plotkin
- Music by: John Swihart
- Production companies: Ten/Four Pictures; Tax Credit Finance; Mirabelle Pictures
- Distributed by: Phase 4 Films
- Release date: July 15, 2011
- Running time: 103 minutes
- Country: United States
- Language: English

Lucky is a 2011 American crime comedy film directed by Gil Cates Jr. and starring Ari Graynor and Colin Hanks. The film featured the song "I Choose Happiness" by David Choi.

== Plot ==
A young blonde woman buys a lottery ticket, and inadvertently leaves behind her ID. The cashier attempts to return it, but she has quickly vanished.

Lucy, another young blonde woman, readies herself for work, putting on a sundress despite the 20 degree weather. She flirts with a distracted colleague and arranges a lunchtime rendezvous with him. However, the meeting turns out to be for him to call off their affair. Lucy subsequently interrupts a meeting to expose their affair publicly, for which she is fired. Meanwhile, another colleague - Ben, who has been performing several of Lucy's more mundane tasks for her - takes a phonecall from his mother and is summoned home for an 'emergency'. The two of them wind up leaving at the same time, and Ben's car troubles result in Lucy giving him a ride to his house. In the car, he experiences a flashback of the two of them as children - he telling her he loves her, and she not reciprocating and running away.

Ben enters the house and is ambushed by cameracrews and journalists, and his mother explains there was no emergency - she discovered that Ben's ticket won a $36 million lottery jackpot. Later, the family watch coverage of their win, juxtaposed with reportage on the disappearance of several women, including the woman from the opening scene, Leslie. Ben informs Leslie's corpse (which is in his closet) that she won the lottery, while Lucy hears about 'his' win over the radio.

Ben's colleagues throw him a party, and Lucy gatecrashes it before engineering some further 'accidental' encounters. Concurrently, a detective investigating Leslie (et al.)'s disappearance interviews her neighbors - including Lucy. Ben's mother, Pauline, invites the now-perpetually-around Lucy to accompany Ben to a news interview and the two grow closer.

Two months later, they are dating. While shopping for a present for his mother, Ben proposes and the pair swiftly marry and enjoy a lavish honeymoon. While on their honeymoon, it transpires that Ben has secretly brought them a new house, and - as the jackpot is being deposited in monthly deposits - the pair has completely run out of money, with both debit and credit cards being declined. Even as Lucy is beginning to realize she may actually have feelings for Ben beyond his wealth, the two fight over this apparent lack of financial acumen, causing Lucy to temporarily leave their hotel room.

When a maid comes to the door, Ben's heightened emotional state cause him to temporarily hallucinate her as being Lucy, resulting in his murderous intentions coming to the fore. He kills her, staging the scene to appear as an accident, just as Lucy returns to apologize. Torn between wanting to report the murder and not wanting to lose her new-found wealth, Lucy suppresses her fear and the two return together to their new house.

News broadcasts reiterate the increasing number of murders, stressing the similar height and hair color of the victims, causing Lucy to dig up the yard behind Ben's old house and find three corpses. Lucy removes the bodies, and reburies them at their new address, concerned less about her own safety (rationalizing that, as the reason for his behavior, she is less at risk) than losing her new status in life. As her mental state deteriorates, she hallucinates a conversation with his previous victims and warns a blonde neighbor to dye her hair.

As Lucy promises herself that she is only staying with Ben until the next check arrives, she voices a belief that she may be pregnant. Lacking the funds for a test, Ben sends her to his mother to obtain one. As the two talk, Lucy becomes convinced that Pauline's positivity about their relationship suggests she is aware of her son's crimes. Lucy beseeches her to admit this, which she does not, and invites her to run away with her, which she also declines. Lucy leaves, resolving finally to abandon Ben - and his money - and Pauline calls her son.

As Lucy drives away, her husband calls to say that the check has finally arrived, and she again changes her mind and goes back to their house for the money. Finding him apparently not home, she recovers the check and attempts to leave, only for Ben to be waiting to surprise her in her car. He brings her back into the house, reveals that he has also murdered her office fling and that he believed her attempts to cover his crimes (reburying the bodies) meant that she was willing to be a partner to it all.

Lucy battles her own feelings - horror, greed, burgeoning love and forgiveness - and even frames Ben's latest murder as being hurtful to her personally, as implying she might be tempted by infidelity unless he kills all possible suitors. Ben has also kidnapped his neighbor - a family planner - under the mistaken assumption that she can act as marriage counsellor, and in a twisted way she does, reminding the pair of the need for honesty and trust. Confused and conflicted, Lucy flees with the check and the two wind up falling into their pool, destroying the check in the process.

As Lucy invites Ben to murder her and bury her with the others, they are interrupted again by the detective who has arrived after reviewing security tapes of the gas station at with earlier-victim Leslie left her ID when buying her lottery ticket: Ben is not on the tape despite his ticket was bought from that gas station on that day. As Lucy tries to concoct a rationale, Ben admits his crime - striving for the honesty to repair his marital relationship - but before he can be arrested, Lucy shoots the detective in fear that the prize money would be lost.

As their one year anniversary approaches, Ben visits his wife in prison, and she expresses anger and promises revenge over her taking the fall for his crimes. Ben commiserates, noting that she did, after all, kill the detective, while her DNA was found on the reburied bodies - rendering his attempts to confess appear false in light of the evidence. She points out that when he kills again, she'll be exonerated and promises revenge. Ben reveals that his desire to kill has abated since she has been incarcerated. Lucy rails against him, but then plaintively asks him to keep visiting her.

== Cast ==
- Colin Hanks as Ben Keller
- Ari Graynor as Lucy St. Martin
- Ann-Margret as Pauline Keller
- Mimi Rogers as Ms. Brand
- Jeffrey Tambor as Detective Harold Waylon
- Adam J. Harrington as Steve Mason

== Reception ==
Review aggregator Rotten Tomatoes reported that 23% of critics gave the film a positive review, based on 13 reviews.

The rating website MovieMavericks gave the film a 2 1/2 star rating saying,"check out Lucky if you're out of new things to watch, but there are plenty of other films to see first." Kirk Honeycutt of Hollywood Reporter gave a negative review saying, "Director Gil Cates Jr. and his writing partner Kent Sublette, along with star Colin Hanks, attempt to recapture the spirit of those 1950s Ealing Studio comedies, but fail to get lucky. Nothing is bleaker than failed black comedy, which this is."
