= James R. Payton Jr. =

American historian (born 1947)

- Born: 1947 (age 78–79)

Philosophical work
- Region: Eastern Christianity
- School: Calvinism; History
- Main interests: Eastern Europe; Patristics; Church History; Eastern Orthodoxy

James R. Payton Jr. (born 1947) is Professor of Patristics and Historical Theology at McMaster Divinity College. He is emeritus Professor of History at Redeemer University.

Payton received his B.A. (Religion) and M.A. (Theology) from Bob Jones University. At Westminster Theological Seminary he completed a Masters in Theology in Church History, along with his Masters of Divinity. He went on to receive his Ph.D. from the University of Waterloo.

== Professional life ==
Payton joined the McMaster Divinity College faculty in 2021. He taught at Redeemer University College for 30 years, retiring in 2015.

Payton has written six books. "Light from the Christian East: An Introduction to the Orthodox Tradition" was published by InterVarsity Press in 2007. This won the Word Guild's First Place awards in the Leadership and the Biblical categories. He followed that up with "Getting the Reformation Wrong: Correcting Some Misunderstandings" in 2010 (also from InterVarsity Press). In 2011 his "Irenaeus on the Christian Faith: A Condensation of 'Against Heresies'" was published by Pickwick Publications. His decades-long studies of the church fathers led to the publication of "A Patristic Treasury: Early Church Wisdom for Today" (Ancient Faith Publishing, 2013). This won the Word Guild's First Place award in the Devotional category in 2014.

Payton has been recognized in the Catholic Historical Review for his work in fostering intellectual dialogue between the Evangelical and Eastern Orthodox Christians.
