= The Ward (film) =

2010 film by John Carpenter

John Carpenter's The Ward
- Theatrical release poster
- Directed by: John Carpenter
- Written by: Michael Rasmussen; Shawn Rasmussen
- Produced by: Doug Mankoff; Peter Block; Mike Marcus; Andrew Spaulding
- Starring: Amber Heard; Mamie Gummer; Danielle Panabaker; Laura-Leigh; Lyndsy Fonseca; Mika Boorem; Jared Harris
- Cinematography: Yaron Orbach
- Edited by: Patrick McMahon
- Music by: Mark Kilian
- Production companies: FilmNation Entertainment; Premiere Picture; Echo Lake Entertainment; A Bigger Boat
- Distributed by: ARC Entertainment; XLrator Media
- Release dates: September 13, 2010 (TIFF); July 8, 2011 (United States)
- Running time: 89 minutes
- Country: United States
- Language: English
- Budget: $10 million
- Box office: $5.3 million

John Carpenter's The Ward (or simply The Ward) is a 2010 American psychological horror film directed by John Carpenter. It stars Amber Heard, Mamie Gummer, Danielle Panabaker, Laura-Leigh, Lyndsy Fonseca, Mika Boorem, and Jared Harris. Set in 1966, the film chronicles the story of a young woman who is institutionalized at a psychiatric ward and finds herself haunted by the ghost of a former patient.

The film was shot on location at the Eastern State Hospital in Medical Lake, Washington. The Ward is Carpenter's last directorial feature to date.

The film premiered at the 2010 Toronto International Film Festival, before releasing in limited theaters in the United States on July 8, 2011. The Ward received $5.3 million worldwide on an estimated $10 million budget. It received negative reviews from critics.

== Plot ==
In rural Oregon, at the North Bend Psychiatric Hospital in 1966, a young patient named Tammy is killed by an unseen force at night.

Kristen, a troubled young woman, sets fire to an abandoned farmhouse and is arrested. The local police take her to North Bend, where she meets the other patients in the ward: artistic Iris, seductive Sarah, wild Emily, and child-like Zoey. Kristen is taken to a room previously occupied by their friend, Tammy, and meets therapist Dr. Stringer. She reveals that she is unable to recall anything about her past. She is attacked by a horribly deformed figure that had been staring at her earlier, but upon telling the nurse this, she is drugged and put through intense electroshock therapy.

Dr. Stringer uses hypnotherapy to unlock Iris's hidden memories. After the session, Iris is killed by transorbital lobotomy by the deformed figure. Kristen finds Iris' sketch of her attacker with the name 'Alice Hudson', a former patient at the hospital. That night, Kristen and Emily attempt to find Iris and escape. However, Kristen is thwarted by Alice and loses consciousness while Emily is caught.

Alice kills Sarah. Kristen discovers that all the girls had killed Alice together because Alice constantly hurt them. Now she is after the girls for revenge. Kristen tries to talk Emily down from attempting suicide but Alice kills her by slitting her throat with a scalpel. Kristen plans to escape again by holding Zoey as a pretend hostage but is drugged and placed in a straitjacket. She escapes it and she and Zoey try to get out. Zoey is killed by Alice off-screen. After a lengthy chase, Kristen seemingly manages to destroy Alice. She finds Alice's file in Dr. Stringer's office, which has each of the girls' names, including Kristen herself.

Dr. Stringer, catching her in his office, reveals that Kristen is actually one of many personalities of the real Alice Hudson, who was kidnapped at age eleven, eight years earlier, and left chained for two months in the basement of the same farmhouse Kristen burned down. In order to survive the trauma, she developed Dissociative Identity Disorder, creating each one of the girls from the ward as a different personality. Over time, Alice's own personality became so overwhelmed by the others that she became lost. Dr. Stringer attempted experimental techniques to bring Alice's own personality back, resulting in the manifestation of Ghost Alice, who destroyed the individual personalities one by one. Her treatments were working until 'Kristen' appeared, as an attempt of Alice's mind to protect the other personalities so she wouldn't need to face her trauma.

As the Kristen personality tries to come to terms with all this, Ghost Alice appears before her and the two begin to fight, each determined to emerge as the dominant personality. During this hallucinatory altercation, "Kristen" falls out the window and hits the ground several stories below. Alice manages to survive the incident, and the Kristen personality finally fades away, reverting Alice to her true self. While being treated for her injuries, Alice is visited by her parents, whom her other personalities had originally written off as strangers. She tells Dr. Stringer that she remembers what happened and finally accepts that she has to face her trauma, resolving not to run from it anymore.

At the end of the movie, Alice, who has seemingly been rehabilitated, packs her belongings as she prepares to leave the hospital. But, when she opens the medicine cabinet above her sink, Kristen lunges out at her, suggesting that the personality is still strong and refuses to be destroyed.

== Cast ==
- Amber Heard as Kristen. A girl with no memories of her life but a strong belief that she is not insane.
- Mamie Gummer as Emily. She is tough and free-spirited but also the one who mostly acts in a wild, insane manner.
- Danielle Panabaker as Sarah, a vain, beautiful redhead and the flirtatious one of the group.
- Laura-Leigh as Zoey, a girl who has suffered emotional trauma so severe that she keeps acting and dressing like a little girl.
- Lyndsy Fonseca as Iris, artistically talented, prim, and proper, is the first of the girls to befriend Kristen.
- Mika Boorem as Alice, a girl who used to be a patient at the ward but is nowhere to be found anymore.
- Jared Harris as Dr. Stringer, the girls' psychiatrist.
- Sydney Sweeney as Young Alice, a young girl who Kristen sees in flashbacks.
- Dan Anderson as Roy, the chief orderly at the ward.
- Susanna Burney as Nurse Lundt, the chief nurse at the ward.
- Sali Sayler as Tammy, a girl who disappears from the ward unexpectedly.
- Mark Chamberlin as Mr. Hudson, the sad man (as Emily describes him and his wife).
- Jillian Kramer as Monster Alice, the ghost responsible for the disappearances.

== Production ==
The film marks a return for Carpenter after a ten-year hiatus of not making any films; his last was the 2001 film Ghosts of Mars. According to Carpenter, "I was burned out...I had fallen out of love with cinematic storytelling". Despite this, in the meantime he had directed the Masters of Horror television episodes "Cigarette Burns" and "Pro-Life". Carpenter said that the series reminded him of why he fell in love with the craft in the first place. Carpenter said that the script "came along at the right time for me", and he was particularly fascinated by how the film took place within a single location.

The film was shot on location in Spokane, Washington, and at the Eastern State Hospital in Medical Lake, Washington. The outside of the hospital is based on the real life, now demolished, McAuley hospital set in the adjacent town of Coos Bay, Oregon. The film was shot at a real operating mental hospital, and the crew was caged in to prevent patients from intervening.

=== Music ===
The Ward (Original Motion Picture Soundtrack)

Soundtrack album by Mark Kilian
- Released: August 16, 2011
- Genre: Horror
- Length: 62:01
- Label: Varèse Sarabande

The Ward (Original Motion Picture Soundtrack) is the soundtrack album for the film. Mark Kilian composed the film's score. This is one of the few theatrical John Carpenter films not scored by the director, the others being The Thing (1982), Starman (1984), and Memoirs of an Invisible Man (1992). The soundtrack was released by Varèse Sarabande on August 16, 2011.

==== Track listing ====
All music is composed by Mark Kilian.

No.	Title	Length
1.	"Opening Titles"	2:35
2.	"Admission"	2:09
3.	"Runaway"	1:44
4.	"Kidnapped"	3:26
5.	"Group Therapy"	2:20
6.	"Elevator Escape"	2:00
7.	"The Truth"	2:54
8.	"Thunderstorm"	1:37
9.	"Shower Time"	4:09
10.	"The Morgue"	1:56
11.	"Burned Alive"	2:49
12.	"Who Is Alice"	4:42
13.	"Alice Is Back"	1:14
14.	"Emotional Trauma"	2:46
15.	"Ghost Story"	2:44
16.	"Tormented"	3:49
17.	"Night Visitor"	2:08
18.	"Hearing Things"	1:55
19.	"New Home"	3:07
20.	"Iris' Pictures"	4:03
21.	"Looking For Iris"	3:23
22.	"End Credits"	4:31
Total length:		62:01

== Release ==
The first footage revealed from the film was on the French channel Canal+. The film premiered on September 13 at the 2010 Toronto International Film Festival. Subsequently, ARC Entertainment and XLrator Media purchased the US distribution rights for The Ward.

After appearing in numerous other film festivals in late 2010, it was released theatrically in the UK on January 21, 2011. The Ward would release in a few US theatres on July 8, 2011, where it grossed $7,760; the worldwide gross was $5.3 million. The film released on DVD and Blu-ray Disc in the US on August 16 that same year, and in the UK on October 17, 2011.

== Reception ==
The Ward received generally negative reviews. On the review aggregator website Rotten Tomatoes, 34% of 73 critics' reviews are positive, with an average rating of 4.5/10. The website's consensus reads: "Lacking the hallmarks of his best work, The Ward proves to be a disappointingly mundane swan song for director John Carpenter" Metacritic, which uses a weighted average, assigned the film a score of 38 out of 100, based on 18 critics, indicating "generally unfavorable" reviews.

Dennis Harvey of Variety wrote, "As usual Carpenter uses the widescreen frame with aplomb, but pic suffers from too little character detailing (even if a late twist explains that), rote scares, and emphasis on a hectic pace over atmosphere." Michael Rechtshaffen of The Hollywood Reporter called it "an atmospheric supernatural thriller that has been stripped of the filmmaker's later excesses". Tim Grierson of Screen International wrote, "Tight as a drum and plenty of fun, John Carpenter's first film in nine years is hardly a groundbreaker, but when the execution is this expert, why complain?" Film Journal International wrote, "Genre veteran John Carpenter's sleekly professional ghost story is well-acted and directed but sadly derivative. Horror fans have seen it all before." The Guardian's Phelim O'Neill also considered the film to be unoriginal, but nevertheless "a well-made film, with some finely crafted shocks".

Jeannette Catsoulis of The New York Times wrote that the film "continues the painful decline of a director who seems more nostalgic for past glories than excited about new ideas". Robert Abele of the Los Angeles Times wrote that the film "feels like a foot-wetting exercise rather than a full-bodied romp in familiar waters". Owen Gleiberman of Entertainment Weekly rated it B− and wrote, "While he does bring his trademark craftsmanship to this snake-pit mental-asylum thriller, the picture has too many old-movie bits rattling around in it." Adam Nayman of Fangoria wrote, "The problem with The Ward is not so much its lack of style as the fact that the director doesn't seem to have much interest in the material". David Harley of Bloody Disgusting rated it 1/5 stars and wrote, "If someone other than Carpenter had been at the helm of The Ward, then no one would be talking about it." Serena Whitney of Dread Central rated it 3.5/5 stars and wrote, "John Carpenter's The Ward is a mediocre thriller that lacks any true original scares and blatantly rips off a twist ending from a far better film."
