= Mark Chamberlin =

American actor

- Born: June 2, 1955; Portland, Oregon, U.S.
- Died: March 22, 2011 (aged 55); Seattle, Washington, U.S.
- Education: Whitman College
- Occupation: Actor
- Years active: 1980–2011
- Spouse: Elizabeth Chamberlin
- Children: 2

Mark Chamberlin (June 2, 1955 – March 22, 2011) was an American film and stage actor. He made his feature film debut in Christmas Evil (1980), and subsequently starred in a leading role in John Irvin's Ghost Story (1981). His final feature film was John Carpenter's The Ward (2011), before his death following a bicycling accident in 2011.

== Life and career ==
Mark Chamberlin was born in Portland, Oregon, and raised in Lake Oswego. He attended Whitman College in Walla Walla, Washington, from which he graduated in 1977.

Chamberlin began his career in the 1980s, appearing in the horror films Christmas Evil (1980) and Ghost Story (1981). He also appeared in the television film Kent State, and the thriller Edge of Honor (1991). He also appeared in a lead role in the Broadway production of 84 Charing Cross Road alongside Ellen Burstyn in 1982, which ran for 96 performances.

Chamberlin spent the majority of his later career working onstage and teaching acting, and was on the board of the University of Washington's School of Drama. His last feature film credit was in John Carpenter's The Ward (2011).

== Death ==
On March 20, 2011, Chamberlin sustained injuries after falling from his bicycle while cycling. He was hospitalized at Harborview Medical Center, where he died two days later from a pulmonary embolism. At the time of his death, he was scheduled to be released from the hospital.

He was survived by his wife, Elizabeth, and their two children.

== Filmography ==
Year	Title	Role	Notes
1980	Christmas Evil	Charles	
1981	Kent State	Tony	Television film
1981	Ghost Story	Young John Jaffrey	
1991	Edge of Honor	Del Bronson	
1999	Money Buys Happiness	Mr. Jackson	
2010	The Ward	Dr. Hudson	
2011	So This Priest Walks Into a Bar	Man	Short film

== Select stage credits ==
Year	Title	Role	Notes	Ref.
1982	84 Charing Cross Road	William Humphries	Broadway; 96 performances	
2006	Tuesdays with Morrie	Mitch Albom	Arizona Theatre Company	
2010	A Christmas Carol	Ebenezer Scrooge	ACT Theatre	
2011	The Odyssey	Odysseus	Taproot Theatre	
