= Laura-Leigh =

American actress

- Education: Juilliard School (BFA)
- Occupation: Actress
- Years active: 2008–present

Laura-Leigh is an American actress. She is best known for her roles in the films The Ward, We're the Millers, a former series regular on the TV series The Client List and as a recurring cast member on season 1 of Vanderpump Rules.

== Biography ==
She grew up in Maumelle, Arkansas.

She graduated from the Juilliard School and upon graduation had a role in the Second Stage Theatre production of Boy's Life, directed by Michael Greif.

After guest starring in several TV series, she co-starred as Zoey in John Carpenter's film The Ward opposite Amber Heard and Mamie Gummer.

Laura-Leigh appeared as herself on the Bravo reality TV series Vanderpump Rules. She was working as a server at SUR, the West Hollywood, California, restaurant owned by former The Real Housewives of Beverly Hills cast member Lisa Vanderpump. She quit her job at SUR and the series for the role of "Kymberly" in the Warner Bros. Pictures comedy film We're the Millers opposite Jennifer Aniston. The film grossed over $270 million worldwide.

Laura-Leigh played the series regular character of "Nikki Shannon" in Jennifer Love Hewitt's TV series The Client List. She co-starred in the comedy motion picture Tooken, a parody of the Taken film series.

Laura-Leigh appeared in David Robert Mitchell's neo-noir crime thriller Under the Silver Lake opposite Andrew Garfield, Zosia Mamet, and Riley Keough in 2019.

== Filmography ==
=== Film ===
Year	Title	Role	Notes
2010	The Ward	Zoey	
2011	The Restaurante	Rachel	
2012	Lost Angeles	Hope	
2013	We're the Millers	Kymberly	
2014	The Wild, the Child & the Miracle	Dawn	Short film
2015	Tooken	Kim Millers	
2016	Fatality	M	Short film
2018	Under the Silver Lake	Mae	

=== Television ===
Year	Title	Role	Notes
2008	Gossip Girl	Amanda Lasher	Episode: "The Ex-Files"
2009	Law & Order	Alicia Carson	Episode: "Lucky Stiff"
2009	Numb3rs	Barista	Episode: "Animal Rites"
2012	Bad Girls		TV film
2013	Vanderpump Rules	Herself	Reality TV; Recurring cast member (season 1)
2013	The Client List	Nikki Shannon	Series regular (season 2)
2019	Blue Bloods	Ruby	Episode: "The Price You Pay"
