= Daniel J. Kremer =

American judge

Daniel J. Kremer (born November 21, 1937) is a former Presiding Justice of the California Fourth District Court of Appeal, Division One, having been appointed to the post by Republican Governor George Deukmejian in 1985.

Born in Olympia, Washington, Kremer attended Everett High School in Everett, Washington, but his attendance at the school was interrupted when he contracted polio in one of the last epidemics of the disease in the 1950s. Kremer won the state title of best high school debater as a senior and graduated from Everett in 1956.

Kremer earned his A.B. in 1960 from Stanford University, where he served as captain of the debate team for two years and won the Joffre Debate against the University of California, Berkeley. After earning his LL.B. from Stanford Law School in 1963, Kremer served as a Deputy Attorney General in Sacramento, California. In 1972, he was promoted to head of the criminal division in the Attorney General's San Diego office. In 1983, Kremer was again promoted, this time to Chief Assistant Attorney General heading the statewide criminal division.

Later that year, Republican Governor George Deukmejian appointed Kremer to serve as a San Diego County Superior Court Judge. In 1985, Deukmejian elevated Kremer to serve as Presiding Justice of the California Fourth District Court of Appeal, Division One. During his service as Presiding Justice, Kremer served as Chair of the Judicial Council's Criminal Trial Delay Reduction Committee, Library Technology Committee, and Court Facilities Task Force. The Judicial Council named Kremer the 2002 Jurist of the Year.

As Presiding Justice, Kremer wrote court opinions ruling in favor of a grower by upholding a $1.7 million judgment against the United Farm Workers for holding an illegal strike, in favor of a teenager by overturning a $166.50 speeding ticket fine imposed by a traffic court, that a widowed father should be given custody of his daughter after his parents-in-law and their attorney used "inexcusable" tactics to try to take custody from him, that an insurance company could not sue to recover losses that occurred in space exploration, that a fundamentalist Christian mother convicted of civil contempt could be charged with felony child-stealing for taking her teenage son from his gay father without violating her constitutional protection against double jeopardy, that a city did not act with gross negligence in a surfer's death by failing to call for off-duty lifeguards, that police did have probable cause to arrest the co-worker of a bludgeoned teenage murder victim, that the owner of an apartment complex could refuse to allow the installation of Cox Cable equipment, and that doctors reporting suspected cases of child abuse were immune from lawsuits by parents.

Presiding Justice Kremer has been active in legal education through programs for the California Judges Association, San Diego law schools and a variety of lawyer and civic groups.

After serving as Presiding Justice for 18 years, Kremer retired on July 31, 2003.

Legal offices
Preceded by Gerald Brown	Presiding Justice of the California Court of Appeal for the Fourth District, Division One; July 30, 1985 – July 31, 2003	Succeeded by Judith McConnell
