= Ten/Four Pictures =

- Industry: Motion pictures
- Founded: 2009
- Headquarters: Los Angeles, CA, United States
- Products: Motion pictures
- Website: www.tenfourpictures.com/

Ten/Four Pictures is a production company engaged in the production and co-financing of motion pictures for worldwide theatrical release. Ten/Four's objective is to make commercially viable films in the $8–15 million range, financing up to 25% of each budget.

== History ==
Partners Gil Cates, Jr. and Caitlin Murney founded the company after producing the psychological thriller Order of Chaos which stars Milo Ventimiglia, Rhys Coiro, Mimi Rogers and Samantha Mathis. Upon inception, Cates and Murney also brought on Sharon Rotzang as VP of Business and Legal Affairs. In April 2010, the company expanded as Steve Cubine was brought on board as VP of Production and Stephanie Hall was promoted to Creative Executive.

The next project helmed under the Ten/Four umbrella was Lucky a dark comedy directed by Cates about a serial killer who wins the lottery and the affection of his childhood sweetheart. The script was penned by "Saturday Night Live" staff writer Kent Sublette and the film stars Ari Graynor, Colin Hanks, Jeffrey Tambor and Ann-Margret.

Ten/Four also produced Pass the Sugar, a documentary directed by Cates that centers on Australian "Diamond" Joe Hachem and his $7.5 million win at the 2005 World Series of Poker.

== Films Produced ==
- Pass the Sugar (2009)
- Order of Chaos (2010)
- Lucky (2010)
