= Monster High =

American fashion doll franchise by Mattel

- Logo introduced in 2016
- Created by: Garrett Sander
- Original work: Toys
- Owner: Mattel
- Years: 2010–present

Print publications
- Books: List of books

Films and television
- Films: List of films
- Television series: Monster High (2022–2024)
- Web series: Monster High (2010–2018)

Miscellaneous
- Spin-off(s): Ever After High; Enchantimals

Official website
- mattel.com/monster-high

Monster High is an American multimedia-supported fashion doll franchise created by toy designer Garrett Sander and launched by Mattel on June 11, 2010. Aimed at children ages 7–16 (Skullector 18+) features characters inspired by monster movies, sci-fi horror, thriller fiction, cryptids, folklore, myths, fairy tales, and popular culture, centering around the adventures of the teenage children of monsters and other mythical creatures attending a high school of the same name.

Though the fashion dolls are the main focus of the franchise, a 2D-animated web series and 15 animated TV specials/films were released to accompany them, as well as video games, a series of young adult novels written by Lisi Harrison, and other forms of merchandise. The franchise quickly became very popular among children and was extremely successful in terms of earnings for Mattel; it was worth $1 billion in its third year of existence with more than $500 million in sales annually, and was at one point the second best-selling doll brand in North America. Two spin-off toy lines were launched as companions to Monster High: Ever After High in 2013, based on fairy tales and fables, and Enchantimals in 2017, featuring human-animal hybrids. However, sales declined in 2016, prompting Mattel to reboot the franchise with a revamped aesthetic and a new fictional universe. The reboot was a commercial failure, eventually leading to the discontinuation of the franchise in 2018.

Monster High relaunched a second time in 2020, with the release of new dolls, culminating with the 2021 announcement of an animated TV series and a live-action musical film, both co-produced by Mattel Television with Nickelodeon.

The Nickelodeon show was announced to be cancelled in September 2024, with Mattel fully moving Generation 3 media to YouTube. With new content now produced by Oddbot Animation, the studio produces music videos and series such as Monster High: The Forgotten Battle of the Bands (2026) and Monster High: Scary Sweet Birthday (2025).

== Premise ==
In the fictional American town of New Salem, the teenage children of famous monsters (and other mythical creatures) attend a high school called Monster High. The school is renowned for allowing all species of monsters to enroll in it: this is in contrast with other schools that exist in the franchise's fantasy world, which are reserved for one type of monster only (for example, a vampire-exclusive school). The characters' stories were told through the TV series, web series, films, the official website, as well as through diaries (booklets) included with the dolls. Since the franchise's beginnings in the 2010s, Monster High has valued diversity among its characters and their visual appearance, personalities, abilities, and cultural backgrounds.

=== Characters ===
Monster High features a variety of fictional characters, many of them being students at the titular high school. The female characters are called "ghouls", and the male characters are called "mansters". When the franchise was first introduced, the characters were generally the sons and daughters of monsters that have been popularized in fiction; in later years, it expanded to also feature characters inspired by other various types of mythical creatures, such as figures from folklore, mythology, and pop culture.

The franchise's official website at the time listed characters in four categories: "original" – the main characters who were introduced the earliest, "ghouls" – the female characters, "mansters" – the male characters, and "Frightmares" – characters who are half-centaur and half-monster. The original characters are:

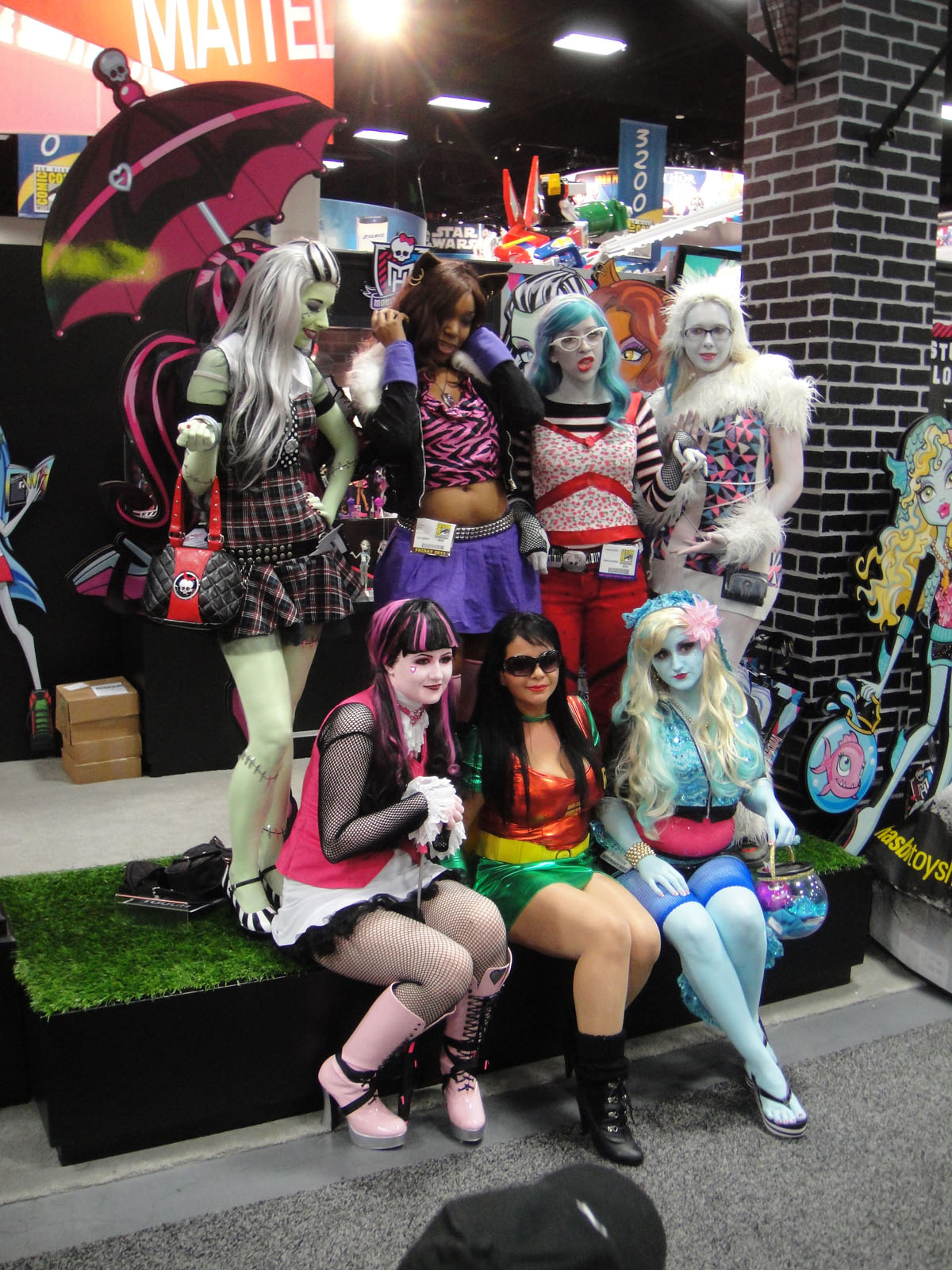
A group of people cosplaying as Monster High characters at San Diego Comic-Con 2011

- Frankie Stein (voiced by Kate Higgins from 2010 to 2016, Cassandra Lee Morris from 2016 to 2018 and iris menas from 2022 onward) is the daughter of Frankenstein's monster and his bride. She is the central character of the franchise. She has white hair with black streaks and light, mint-green skin. Frankie is a simulacrum, meaning that her body is made of many different parts. She is clumsy, sweet, and always kind to others. She has a crush on Neighthan Rot. In the series, she used to date Jackson Jekyll and Holt Hyde, but this is different in the diaries, where both characters are in a relationship with Draculaura instead. In the first two incarnations of the franchise, Frankie uses she/her pronouns, while in the 2022 reboot they are non-binary and use they/them pronouns. In the 2022 reboot, Frankie is dating Cleo.
- Draculaura (voiced by Debi Derryberry from 2010 to 2018 and Courtney Lin from 2022 onward) is a vampire who is the adopted daughter of Dracula. She is in a relationship with Clawdeen's older brother, Clawd Wolf. She is a vegetarian who faints at the sight of blood. The diaries show that she used to date Jackson Jekyll and Holt Hyde. She has fangs and typically dresses in pink, black and white. In the 2022 reboot, she secretly practices witchcraft.
- Cleo de Nile (voiced by Salli Saffioti from 2010 to 2018 and Kausar Mohammed from 2022 onwards) is the daughter of the mummy pharaoh Ramses de Nile, and is 5842 years old at the start of the series. She is the captain of the "fearleading" squad. Cleo prefers to accessorize with light-gold bandages or mummy wrappings. She is based on Cleopatra, while her older sister, Nefera de Nile, is based on Nefertiti. She is the queen of the social scene and has a boyfriend named Deuce Gorgon, the son of Medusa. In Clawd Wolf's diary, he mentions dating Cleo because of pressure, but they broke up, thinking they're more fit as friends, before she started to date Deuce. In the 2022 reboot, Cleo and Frankie are a couple.
- Clawdeen Wolf (voiced by Salli Saffioti from 2010 to 2018 and Gabrielle Nevaeh Green from 2022 onward) is the daughter of a werewolf. She is described as outgoing and sweet. She likes fashion. She has a bit of a temper at times when messed with, but can easily control it when coaxed properly. Her wolf ears are pierced in multiple places. In the 2016 reboot of Monster High, she develops mutual feelings for Raythe. As of 2024, Clawdeen has been in an official relationship with Toralei Stripe, a werecat.
- Lagoona Blue (voiced by Laura Bailey from 2010 to 2015, Larissa Gallagher from 2016 to 2018 and Valeria Rodriguez from 2022 onwards) is the daughter of a sea monster. Lagoona is from "Down Under" and speaks with an Australian accent. She can talk with water animals. She is in a relationship with Gillington "Gil" Webber, but his parents disapprove of their relationship due to her sea-monster heritage. In the 2022 reboot she is Honduran and knows little about the outside due to growing up in a sunken castillo.
- Ghoulia Yelps (vocal effects by Audu Paden in most projects, and voiced by Felicia Day in the 2022 TV series) is the bespectacled daughter of a zombie couple from Canada. She is the smartest ghoul at Monster High, her personality is that of a shy and bookish girl with a sense of mischief. Due to being a zombie, she can only speak in moans and groans – a physical limitation that all zombies have. She has a romantic interest in Sloman "Slo Mo" Mortavitch, a tall male zombie on the chess team. In the 2022 reboot, she fully speaks English.
- Abbey Bominable (voiced by Erin Fitzgerald from until 2015, Cristina Milizia between 2017 and 2018, and Aishwarya Pillai in the 2022 TV series) is the Russian-accented daughter of the Yeti. She is a proud and straightforward ghoul who doesn't readily spend words to bring her message more delicately. She's also very strong in terms of both physical abilities and psychokinetic ones and therefore intimidating, but although occasionally useful, she'd rather be known as simply a nice monster to hang out with. She has a romantic interest in Heath Burns, who she claims "makes her laugh".

== Conception and development ==
Mattel began conceptualizing the Monster High franchise in 2007; the company filed for a trademark of the name "Monster High" in October of that year. Garrett Sander—then a packaging designer at Mattel—and his twin brother Darren went shopping with young girls one day, where they noticed that the young girls were into goth fashion. This served as inspiration for creating a toy brand with a dark aesthetic. Darren was involved with the early concepts for the brand; he came up with the slogan "(Where) Freaky Just Got Fabulous!". He also remarked that because the characters were monsters, they had more freedom to do things that ordinary kids could not do. Other inspirations for the brand include children's interests in Tim Burton and Lady Gaga.

== Merchandise ==
=== Dolls ===
Monster High dolls
- The original line of Monster High dolls released in 2010. From left to right: Clawdeen Wolf, Lagoona Blue, Cleo de Nile, Deuce Gorgon, Frankie Stein, and Draculaura. (Note: This is a promotional image featuring prototypes; the actual dolls released in 2010 looked slightly different from the way they do in this image.)
- Type: Fashion doll
- Invented by: Garrett Sander
- Company: Mattel
- Country: United States
- Availability: 2010–2018, 2020–present
- Slogan: "(Where) Freaky Just Got Fabulous!" (2010–2011); "Be yourself, be unique, be a monster!" (2011–2016; 2022–present); "How Do You Boo (Be Out Of The Ordinary)?" (2016–2019); "Everyone Is Welcome!" (2017–2020)

Fashion dolls were the first franchise product to be released, with the media and other merchandise following soon after. The first line, which included the original six characters, was released in 2010. Mattel was experimenting with a new business strategy which consisted of launching a new franchise by releasing the toy first—without a "traditional entertainment property first"—and then following up with the media and entertainment. The original packaging boxes were designed by Garrett Sander himself. According to a social media post made by Sander in 2020, the first prototypes of the dolls during its development were made using head molds from another Mattel doll line that was never officially released, bodies from Barbie collector dolls, and with some accessories from My Scene dolls. A good amount of the initial design remained unchanged, but the actual dolls ended up looking drastically different.

Over 750 different dolls have been released since its 2010 launch. They vary in size, features, materials used, type of packaging, types of accessories they come with, country of manufacture, etc. Most of them are about 10.5 in (270 mm) tall. Some dolls, particularly the ones which were released a long time ago or in limited quantity, are rare, collectible, and therefore expensive. Most Monster High dolls were marketed to children as toys to play with, but some "collector's edition" dolls, priced higher and aimed at an older audience, were also made.

In 2016, Monster High underwent a reboot, which was likely an attempt to make the brand appeal to a younger age category. The sales were low that year, and the line was eventually quietly discontinued in 2018. In 2020, the franchise returned with two "Skullector" dolls inspired by It and The Shining, released just before Halloween. In 2021, a new set of two Skullector dolls inspired by characters from the movie Beetlejuice was launched exclusively through the "Mattel Creations" section of Mattel's website alongside a doll inspired by the film Gremlins 2: The New Batch. In 2022, Mattel presented a new Monster High line called "Haunt Couture" (wordplay on "haute couture") which consisted of five new collector dolls: the five main characters of Frankie Stein, Clawdeen Wolf, Draculaura, Cleo de Nile and Lagoona Blue. They featured details such as rooted eyelashes and were priced at $75, and similarly were only available through the website. On Friday, May 13, 2022, Mattel released a new "Booriginal Creeproductions" line of Monster High dolls which were a tribute to the original 2010 line. It featured four of the main characters dressed in their original outfits and packaged in boxes that took heavy inspiration from the original packaging. They were priced at $25 each and at first available exclusively at Walmart outlets in the United States, and then also worldwide through the "Mattel Creations" section of the Mattel website. They were aimed at older consumers who grew up with the original dolls prior to their 2018 discontinuation. Since then, Mattel has continued to periodically release new Monster High dolls, aimed at consumers and collectors alike.

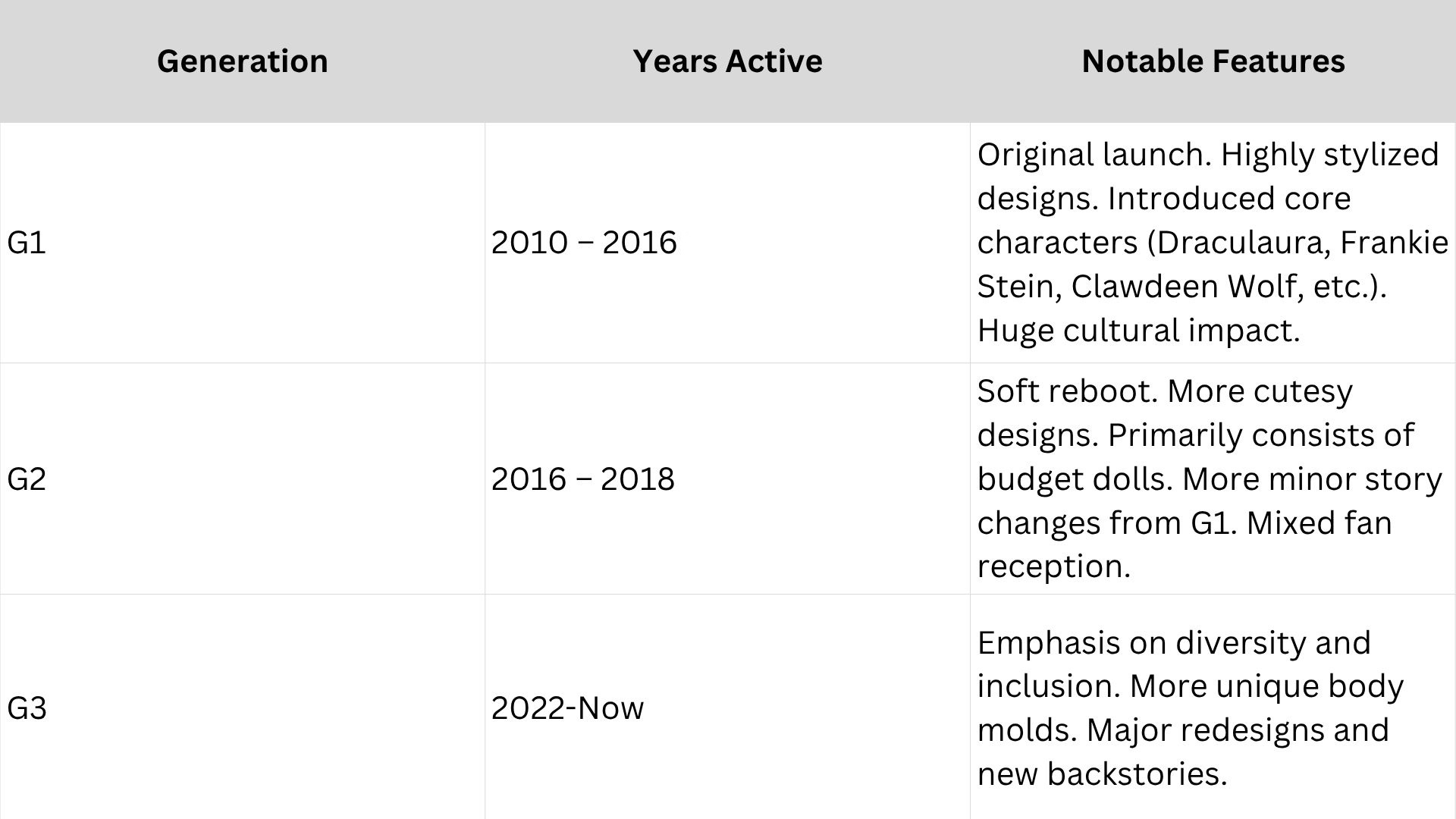
Table of generations 1-3 of Monster High with dates.

=== Other merchandise ===
Various other Monster-High-branded products have been released: they include collectible vinyl figurines, Halloween costumes, plushies, stationery, children's clothing, accessories, and makeup, perfume, and more. In February 2022, American fashion designer Maisie Wilen collaborated with Mattel to create a pair of earrings inspired by one of the main Monster High characters' style; they were available for $50 exclusively through the "Mattel Creations" section of the Mattel website. In April 2022, Mattel collaborated with Hot Topic on a clothing collection inspired by the aesthetics of the franchise.

== Media ==
Launched in the digital media era, Monster High began adaptation into a web series which had its debut on YouTube on 5 May 2010, followed by a 23-minute TV special, Monster High: New Ghoul at School on October 30 that same year which premiered on Nickelodeon in the United States. The aforementioned New Ghoul at School and the next TV special, Fright On! were 2D-animated, with the following films animated in computer-generated imagery: "Why Do Ghouls Fall in Love", "Escape from Skull Shores", "Friday Night Frights", "Scaris: City of Frights", "Ghouls Rule", "13 Wishes", "Freaky Fusion", "Haunted", "Boo York, Boo York", Great Scarrier Reef, Welcome to Monster High and Electrified. Other films were reported to be in development until the first franchise reboot and the discontinuation of Ever After High in 2016. Starting with Fright On! in 2011, the specials and films were released in direct-to-video home video formats by Universal Pictures Home Entertainment. The films ranked Monster High as the second in the list of children's direct-to-video franchises that year, according to online magazines and publications. The films and specials have also appeared on streaming services/platforms like Netflix and Amazon Prime Video.

In the 2015 film "Boo York, Boo York", a character known as Astranova makes contact with Apple White and Raven Queen from Ever After High suggesting a crossover in the future. However, the first franchise reboot and the discontinuation of Ever After High derailed and cancelled those plans (which also included more based-on films than the 16 indicated); brief storyboard animatics were instead released on the official Monster High YouTube channel under the title The Lost Movie and early designs for the EAH characters intended for the crossover have been released online.

In 2021, it was announced that Mattel Television would produce a live-action musical film and an animated TV series for Nickelodeon, which premiered in October 2022. Both projects feature more gender diversity and LGBT characters.

=== Monster High: Kowa Ike Girls ===
Monster High: Kowa Ike Girls (Japanese: モンスター・ハイ こわイケガールズ, romanized: Monsutā Hai Kowa Ike Gāruzu; Monsutā Hai and Gāruzu being transliteration of "Monster High" and "Girls", respectively) is an 8-episode series of 3-minute Japanese animated shorts produced by Shougakukan Music & Digital Entertainment, and animated at Picona Creative Studio. The shorts were broadcast as a part of TXN's morning children's television programming block Oha Suta beginning on October 22, 2014. Mattel Japan's official YouTube account later released the shorts online.

The theme song, simply titled "Monster High" (Japanese: モンスター・ハイ, romanized: Monsutā Hai), was sung by Japanese teen idol girl band Amorecarina, featuring Kaede (from another idol girl band, Chu-Z) as a rapper. It was included in Amorecarina's debut single of the same name, along with an instrumental version.

The Kowa Ike Girls shorts were released in Japanese only.

=== Video games ===
Video games based on the franchise were released to accompany the audiovisual media.

==== Monster High: Ghoul Spirit ====
The first game released was Monster High: Ghoul Spirit, available for the Nintendo DS and the Wii consoles on 25 October 2011. This release featured a special "Ghoulify" function for the Nintendo DSi. The game revolves around the player being the new 'ghoul' in school and must work their way through activities and social situations to finally be crowned 'Scream Queen'.

==== Monster High: Skultimate Roller Maze ====
Another video game for Nintendo DS, Nintendo 3DS and Wii titled Monster High: Skultimate Roller Maze was released in November 2012. This game allowed players to experience the Monster High sport - Skultimate Roller Maze. Teams compete their way through a hazardous maze of obstacles.

==== Monster High: 13 Wishes ====
The third video game for the Wii, Wii U, Nintendo DS, and Nintendo 3DS named after Monster High: 13 Wishes was released in October 2013. In this game, players take on the role of Frankie Stein who must free her friends from a magical lantern by collecting thirteen shards of a magic mirror.

==== Other games ====
Mobile apps Ghoul Box and Sweet 1600 are available on iTunes for the iPad and iPhone devices. The Monster High website has also released a series of catacomb-themed web games: "trick or trance", "phantom roller" and "scary sweet memories". In November 2015, Monster High: New Ghoul in School was released for the Xbox 360, PC, PlayStation 3, Wii, 3DS, and Wii U. The PC version was de-listed on Steam in 2017. In October 2024, Monster High: Skulltimate Secrets was released for PlayStation 4, PlayStation 5, Nintendo Switch, and PC.

=== Book series ===
==== Monster High Book series ====
Lisi Harrison, a Canadian author known for writing popular book series; The Clique and The Alphas, wrote some young adult novels based on the franchise using a different fictional universe than the web series and deal with the Regular-Attribute Dodgers (RADs) and their struggles with love, social life, school and not to be outed as monsters to humans.

Mattel released Harrison's first Monster High novel on 26 September 2010. The book revolves around Frankie Stein and Melody Carver. The second book in the series, The Ghoul Next Door, was released at the end of March 2011 and features chapters on Cleo de Nile.

The third book featuring Clawdeen Wolf is titled Where There's a Wolf, There's a Way and was released on 29 September 2011. The fourth novel titled Back And Deader Than Ever was released on May 1, 2012 and features Draculaura. Another Monster High book called Drop Dead Diary was released on January 19, 2011; it was written by a pseudonymous author Abaghoul Harris.

Monster High by Lisi Harrison
No.	Title	Date	ISBN
1	Monster High	September 1, 2010	978-0316099189
Melody Carver and her family have just moved to New Salem, Oregon. She begins her school year at Merston High, where she meets other girls, Frankie Stein, Clawdeen Wolf, Cleo de Nile, Draculaura, and Lagoona Blue. As each day moves forward, a mystery begins to unravel. Are these girls actually who they say they are or is there more to them?
2	The Ghoul Next Door	April 5, 2011	978-0316099110
After the events of the September Semi, the ghouls try to fix their errors of possibly exposing monsters to the normies at Merston High. They try to make a documentary with the hopes of showing a softer side to their Monsters; however, Becca and Haylee have other plans. Will Cleo, Melody, and the ghouls be able to put a wrench in their plans or will they make more problems for monsters?
3	Where There's a Wolf, There's a Way	September 20, 2011	978-0316099196
4	Back and Deader Than Ever	May 1, 2012	978-0316099172

==== Ghoulfriends book series ====
Author Gitty Daneshvari has written a Ghoulfriends series focusing on Monster High characters Venus McFlytrap, Robecca Steam, and Rochelle Goyle. The four books include: Ghoulfriends Forever, Ghoulfriends Just Want To Have Fun, Who's That Ghoulfriend? and Ghoulfriends 'Til the End .

Monster High Ghoulfriends by Gitty Daneshvari
No.	Title	Date	ISBN
1	Ghoulfriends Forever	September 5, 2012	978-0316222495
Rochelle Goyle, Venus McFlytrap, and Rebecca Steam meet at Monster High for their first year, which ends up being one to remember. New teacher, Ms. Flapper, from Bitealy, has a secret that the three ghouls much uncover. Will they figure it out in time or will they be too late?
2	Ghoulfriends Just Want to Have Fun	April 2, 2013	978-0316222532
3	Who's That Ghoulfriend?	September 10, 2013	978-0316222549
4	Ghoulfriends 'til the End	April 8, 2014	978-0316222518
N–A	The Ghoul-It-Yourself Book	September 2, 2014	978-0316282222
This is an activity book featuring the Ghoulfriends; and, also includes a short story by Daneshvari.

==== Monster High Diaries book series ====
A book series by Nessi Monstrata was released covering five of the main franchise characters.

Monster High Diaries by Nessi Monstrata
No.	Title	Date	ISBN
1	Draculaura and the New Stepmomster	August 4, 2015	978-0316300841
2	Frankie Stein and the New Ghoul at School	November 3, 2015	978-0316300940
Frankie shows new student Isi Dawndancer around.
3	Lagoona Blue and the Big Sea Scarecation	February 1, 2016	978-0316300803
4	Clawdeen Wolf and the Freaky-Fabulous Fashion Show	May 3, 2016	978-0316300780
5	Cleo and the Creeperific Mummy Makeover	August 2, 2016	978-0316266369

==== Monster Rescue book Series ====
A book series by Misty Von Spooks was released that featured the Generation 2 franchise characters.

Monster Rescue by Misty Von Spooks
No.	Title	Date	ISBN
1	Operation Find Cleo!	December 6, 2016	978-0316315692
Connected to Generation 2 characters, this story details out how Draculaura, Frankie Stein, and Clawdeen Wolf rescue Cleo de Nile and bring her to Monster High.
2	Go Get Lagoona!	April 11, 2017	978-0316315777
The ghouls are ready to bring their next student to Monster High. This time, they go to the Great Scarrier Beach to rescue Lagoona Blue and bring her back to Monster High.
3	Track Down Twyla!	August 8, 2017	978-0316431606
After two adventures, the ghouls are officially the Monster High Rescue Squad. This time, they travel to Boogey Mansion to meet up with Twyla Boogeyman and ask her if she wants to attend Monster High.
4	I Spy Deuce Gorgon!	December 5, 2017	978-0316557917
The Monster High Rescue Squad is out on another adventure and this time the ghouls are headed to Greece, where they meet up with Deuce Gorgon to get him to attend Monster High.

=== Comics ===
In 2024, IDW Publishing began releasing a line of Monster High comics including the limited series Monster High: New Scaremester, Monster High: World's Scare, Monster High: House Haunters, and Monster High: Boomuda Triangle, as well as the one-shots Monster High Pride 2024, Monster High: Halloween Special, Monster High: Howliday Haunt, Monster High: Bull's Eye, Monster High Pride 2025, Monster High: Locketness Monster, and Monster High: Party Monster.

=== Music ===
Two songs titled "Fright Song" (2010), by Windy Wagner, and "We Are Monster High" (2013), by Madison Beer, were released digitally along with live-action music videos on YouTube. Ewa Farna additionally released Polish and Czech versions of "Fright Song" called "Monster High". In 2025, girl group Katseye covered "Fright Song". Numerous soundtracks have also been released.

== Spin-offs ==
With the popularity of Monster High, companion doll lines were launched. Ever After High (abbreviated EAH) launched in July 2013 and features the children of characters of well-known fairy tales and fables. The franchise mainly focuses on Apple White, daughter of Snow White, and Raven Queen, daughter of the Evil Queen, also from Snow White in lead roles. Both represent the main conflict of its associated web series originally released on YouTube: the Royals, which is composed of students like Apple White who "want to follow their predetermined fairy tale story", versus the Rebels, which composed of students like Raven Queen who "wish to 'rewrite' their story/tale". The C. A. Cupid character from Monster High began featuring in its corresponding series from the 4th webisode onward where she is an exchange student there.

The second companion line was launched on July 18, 2017, as Enchantimals, featuring animal-inspired humanoid characters with a corresponding animal companion each as their pets. This was in response to the growth of the My Little Pony: Friendship Is Magic fandom. It was originally tied to Ever After High, but fully branched off with EAH's declining sales.

In February 2026, Mattel revealed a spinoff, Moonspell Magic by Monster High, which focuses on a witch school by the name of Moonspell High. The doll line focuses on 5 witches who are all different, and embracing these differences. The line released in July 2026.

== Reception ==
Monster High was a massive financial success for Mattel, becoming a billion-dollar brand in just three years and surpassing executives' expectations. During the first few years, the dolls' quickly rising popularity caused the sales of Mattel's own Barbie dolls to decline; in 2013, while Barbie remained the best-selling doll brand, Monster High became the second best-selling doll brand, with more than $500 million in annual sales. In 2010, shortly after the dolls launched for the first time, they were so popular it was sometimes hard to find them in stores due to scarcity and they were selling out quickly. The line's success was partially thanks to its appeal to younger children who were choosing to play with toys which were "a little bit edgier" than traditional fashion dolls like Barbie, its "anti-bullying message" which encouraged children to be themselves and embrace their own flaws and differences, and the "deep engagement" of fans with the franchise which was maintained through media and merchandise. It was built on a "trans-media storytelling [business] model, since it did not start with a traditional entertainment property first", which also contributed to its success. Even though the franchise experienced a lot of growth in its first few years, especially during 2012 and 2013, sales started declining in 2014. In 2016, the sales were weak. Ultimately, the line was discontinued in 2018, then brought back two years later. On May 16, 2022, when a new doll line featuring reproductions of the original 2010 dolls was made available online through the "Mattel Creations" section of the Mattel website, demand was high: the dolls sold out in less than one day.

The franchise has received positive recognition for its promotion of diversity among the characters, especially in comparison with other toy brands with similar levels of popularity. This diversity continues to be a major selling point in Mattel's marketing of the franchise. In 2022, during the rollout of a new doll line, Lisa McKnight—Executive Vice President of Barbie & Dolls at Mattel—said: "We've been waiting for the right moment to reignite the Monster High brand to connect with [...] issues that are core to our purpose, like inclusion, diversity and community [...] with the updated franchise focused on being authentic, true to yourself and celebrating differences."

=== Controversy ===
Monster High has some controversy and criticism, citing that the dolls' unrealistic bodies, often revealing outfits, and characters' focus on romantic relationships were a bad influence on young children. They were criticized for being "hyper-sexualized" and reinforcing gender stereotypes about women; it was even implied that children could develop low self-esteem and eating disorders due to the presentation of unattainable body types. Peggy Orenstein similarly criticized Monster High in her 2011 book Cinderella Ate My Daughter.

=== Competition ===
Inspired by the commercial success of Monster High, other toy manufacturers — namely some of the biggest competitors in the toy industry which is the field of franchise owner Mattel — launched their own toy lines with a similar premise and/or aesthetic. In 2012, MGA Entertainment launched Bratzillaz (House of Witchez), a spin-off of the Bratz brand; it featured a similar theme centered around the paranormal, and was seen as MGA's attempt at capitalizing off of the success of Monster High. The same year, MGA also launched Novi Stars, a sci-fi-themed line of fashion dolls that featured extraterrestrial humanoids.. Another doll line released that year was Mystixx Vampires,manufactured by Playhut Inc. This line featured a head twisting transformation gimmick that allowed each doll to switch between a human and a vampire appearance. In 2013, The Bridge Direct launched Pinkie Cooper, which featured a humanoid Cocker Spaniel of the same name; in an interview with CNN Money, analyst Gerrick Johnson named both Monster High and Novi Stars as "competitors that come closest" to the dog-headed fashion doll. Also in 2013, Hasbro launched My Little Pony: Equestria Girls as an anthropomorphized spin-off of the 2010 incarnation of the main My Little Pony franchise; it featured the counterparts of My Little Pony characters in human-like silhouettes with non-human skin colors; it was regarded as Hasbro's take on Monster High.

== Bibliography ==
- Terrace, Vincent (2014). Internet Horror, Science Fiction and Fantasy Television Series, 1998–2013. McFarland & Company. ISBN 9781476616452 – via Google Books.
