= Ellen Marlow =

American actress (born 1994)

- Born: Ellen Taylor Marlow; February 22, 1994 (age 32); Dallas, Texas, US
- Occupation: Actress
- Years active: 2008–present
- Known for: Role of Claire Lyons in The Clique

Ellen Taylor Marlow (born February 22, 1994) is an American actress. She is best known for her role as Claire Lyons in The Clique movie based on the books by Lisi Harrison. Marlow has also appeared in multiple television, Broadway and touring company productions.

== Life ==
Ellen Taylor Marlow was born in Dallas, Texas. She moved to Austin, Texas at age 3. After moving to New York City to make her Broadway debut in 2005, she relocated to the Los Angeles area where she lived from 2007 through 2015. She returned to New York City in 2015 and now also maintains a residence in Austin.

== Career ==
Ellen Marlow portrayed the role of Claire Lyons in the Warner Premiere movie The Clique based on the New York Times' best selling book by Lisi Harrison that was released in fall of 2008.

Ellen originated the lead role of Jemima Potts in the Broadway production of the Tony-nominated musical "Chitty Chitty Bang Bang". In dream-come-true fashion, she was chosen for the coveted role from among 3000 young hopefuls at an open casting call and, at the age of ten, moved to New York City, where she would also appear as Katarina in director Des McAnuff’s NY staged reading of the musical Zhivago.

Prior to Broadway, the Texas native was seen in regional theatre productions of Grease (as Sandy), Joseph and The Amazing Technicolor Dreamcoat and The Wizard of Oz.

In addition to making numerous public singing appearances in support of Chitty (including The Today Show), Ellen has performed the National Anthem at various sporting events in Texas and New York. On film, she played the young Fiona in Quid Pro Quo, which debuted to acclaim at the 2008 Sundance Film Festival.

Marlow continues to develop her career in film, television, theater, and music. She has appeared in the Jerry Bruckheimer produced ABC pilot for The Forgotten starring Christian Slater as well as episodes of Cold Case, CSI: Crime Scene Investigation and Criminal Minds.

Ellen performed in the touring company of Kinky Boots in 2016 through 2017 appearing across North America and Japan.

In January 2020, she joined the Broadway production of Disney’s Frozen.

== Filmography ==
=== Film ===
Year	Film	Role	Notes
2008	The Clique	Claire Lyons	
2008	Quid Pro Quo	Young Fiona Ankany	
2009	What We Became	Sunshine Harris	Short film

=== Television ===
Year	Title	Role	Notes
2008	Cory in the House	An "Up With Goodness Singer"	Episode: "Uninvited Pest"
2008	Cold Case	Laura Finch	Episode: "One Small Step"
2008	The Today Show	Herself	
2009	The Forgotten	Amy Benedict	Episode: "Pilot"
2010	Hannah Montana	Felicia "Feli" Unders	1 episode
2010	Criminal Minds	Lindsay	Episode: "Risky Business"
2010	C.S.I.	Singer #3	Episode: "World's End"
2015	Last Week Tonight with John Oliver	Amber	Episode: "Municipal Violations"
2018	#Fashionvictim	N/A	Television film
