= Keli Price =

American film producer and actor

Background information
- Born: June 30, 1990 (age 36); New York City, U.S.
- Occupations: Film producer, actor
- Years active: 2007–present
- Website: www.priceproductionsltd.com

Keli Price (born June 30, 1990) is an American film producer, actor, and musician known for executive producing the biographical crime film Bandit (2022), and for his roles as Bobby Love in Nickelodeon's The Naked Brothers Band "Battle of The Bands" (2007) TV movie episode, and Chris Abeley in the Warner Bros. film The Clique (2008), based on the best-selling young adult book series of the same name.

== Early life ==
Keli Price was born in Manhattan, New York and grew up on Long Island, New York. He developed an early love of movies and music from his father, a musician.

== Career ==
=== 2007–2015: Early acting and music career ===
In 2007, Price guest starred in the Nickelodeon musical comedy television series The Naked Brothers Band as Bobby Love, the lead singer of the band The L.A. Surfers in the eleventh and twelfth episodes of the first season, The Battle of the Bands, which was first released direct-to-DVD on September 4, 2007 and later premiered on television on October 6, 2007 on Nickelodeon. The episodes follow a rock-mockumentary format.

Price later starred in the Warner Bros. film The Clique, based on the bestselling young adult series of the same name, as Chris Abeley, Massie Block's romantic crush and the older brother of Layne Abeley.

In 2010, Price was named the BMI Young Songwriter of the Year and received the Abe Olman Scholarship for Excellence in Songwriting.

Price guest starred in the American single-camera sitcom television series About a Boy on NBC in 2014, and in 2015 on the sitcom Your Family or Mine on TBS, alongside Richard Dreyfuss and JoBeth Williams.

In 2014 and 2015, he was a series regular in the musical drama series Side Effects on E! and AwesomenessTV, which aired in October 2013 as a special on AwesomenessTV’s YouTube channel, where it generated 2.5 million views in its first week. The second season was released in May 2014.

=== 2017–present: Film production career and later acting projects ===
In 2017, Price produced the feature film On Thin Ice, a social justice-themed sports documentary featuring athletes Allyson Felix, Evander Holyfield, Robbie Rogers, Apolo Ohno, and Greg Louganis, which aired on the Canadian Broadcasting Corporation. Also in 2017, he starred in the horror film Sleep No More from the creator of Final Destination.

In 2020, Price produced and starred in the comedy film Reboot Camp, with David Koechner and Ed Begley Jr., which won the Comedy Vanguard Audience Award for best comedy film at the Austin Film Festival and was released by Entertainment Studios Motion Pictures in May 2021.

In 2022, Price executive produced the biographical crime film Bandit, starring Josh Duhamel, Elisha Cuthbert, and Mel Gibson, based on the true life story of Gilbert Galvan ("The Flying Bandit"), who still holds the record for the most consecutive robberies in Canadian history. The film was released in theaters in the U.S. and Canada on September 23, 2022, and was also made available on digital platforms. In its first two weeks of release, Bandit was the most-watched movie on iTunes across multiple categories and was the 5th most-watched film on the platform. On October 28, 2022, one month after its release, Redbox announced that the film was the most-watched original title of 2022 and its “second-best original release ever” based on total transactions.

Price starred as the villain Ares in the superhero film The Hyperions in 2022. Also in 2022, he produced the thriller film Hunt Club, starring Mena Suvari, which was released in April 2023.

In 2023, he produced and wrote The Curse of Wolf Mountain, starring Danny Trejo and Tobin Bell. Price also executive produced Saban Films' Hellfire, starring Stephen Lang, Harvey Keitel, and Dolph Lundgren.

In February 2023, he finished production on the documentary Mad Props, which follows lawyer-turned-banker Tom Biolchini on a journey to "prove to historians and critics alike that movie props are as important an art form as the greatest paintings and sculptures in history." Also in 2023, Price wrote and produced Murder at Hollow Creek, starring Jason Patric, Mickey Rourke, Penelope Ann Miller, and Casper Van Dien.

== Films and television shows ==
| Year | Film/TV series | Role | Genre |
|---|---|---|---|
| 2007 | Bug Boy | Danny | Independent drama |
| 2007 | Star & Stella Save the World | Justin | Comedy |
| 2007 | "Battle of the Bands" (The Naked Brothers Band TV movie) | Bobby Love | Rock-Mockumentary |
| 2008 | The Clique | Chris Abeley | Comedy |
| 2012 | One Fall | Josh | Drama |
| 2013-2015 | Side Effects | Zak | Musical Drama |
| 2015 | The Sound of Magic | Lee | Comedy |
| 2015 | Your Family or Mine | Colin | Comedy |
| 2015 | About A Boy | Gus | Comedy |
| 2017 | Sleep No More | Joe | Horror |
| 2019 | Underdogs Rising | Oliver Taylor Smith | Drama |
| 2019 | Freakin Weekend | Owen | Comedy |
| 2020 | Reboot Camp | Danny | Comedy |
| 2020 | Infamous Six | Chase | Horror |
| 2021 | Black Planet | Ric | Action |
| 2021 | Two Sides | Kris Harper | Drama |
| 2022 | Bandit | Executive Producer | Crime Drama |
| 2022 | The Curse of Wolf Mountain | AJ | Horror |
| 2022 | The Hyperions | Ares | Drama |
| 2023 | Hunt Club | Producer | Thriller |
| 2023 | Murder at Hollow Creek | Gavin Brooks | Action-Comedy |
| 2023 | Rap Shit | Kirk | Comedy |
