= The Clique (film) =

2008 film by Michael Lembeck

- DVD cover
- Directed by: Michael Lembeck
- Screenplay by: Liz Tigelaar
- Based on: The Clique by Lisi Harrison
- Produced by: Leslie Morgenstein; Bob Levy
- Starring: Elizabeth McLaughlin; Ellen Marlow
- Cinematography: Michael Weaver
- Edited by: David Finfer
- Music by: George S. Clinton
- Production companies: Alloy Entertainment; Bankable Productions
- Distributed by: Warner Bros. Pictures (Note: Released under the Warner Premiere label.)
- Release date: November 11, 2008
- Running time: 88 minutes
- Country: United States
- Language: English

The Clique is a 2008 American teen comedy-drama film directed by Michael Lembeck from a screenplay by Liz Tigelaar, based on the young adult novel series of the same name by Lisi Harrison. The film was produced by Alloy Entertainment and Tyra Banks' company Bankable Productions, and was released on November 11, 2008. It stars Elizabeth McLaughlin and Ellen Marlow, with Bridgit Mendler, Samantha Boscarino, and Sophie Anna Everhard in supporting roles.

== Plot ==
Twelve-year-old Massie Block is the leader of the Pretty Committee, a clique of popular, wealthy students at her Westchester County, New York all-girls private school, Octavian Country Day. Her father informs her that Jay Lyons, a friend of his from Florida, will be moving into the Block family's guest house with his wife and two children until they can find a permanent residence. Massie is horrified that the unexpected guests are disrupting her plans and occupying her space, but her parents insist she attempt to get along with Jay's daughter Claire, who is Massie's age and will be attending her school.

Anxious for the approval of her wealthy peers, Claire convinces her mother to take her shopping. At the mall, she meets Dylan Marvil and her friends Alicia Rivera and Kristen Gregory. Meanwhile, Massie encounters an older boy named Chris Abeley while horseback riding, and is immediately smitten with him. He makes plans to go riding with her again, which she interprets as a romantic gesture.

The next day, Claire accompanies Massie on her ride to school. On the way, they pick up Dylan, Alicia, and Kristen; despite having been friendly to Claire the day before, the girls grow cold and dismissive toward her upon realizing Massie dislikes her. Once at school, Claire encounters Chris and also finds herself attracted to him. Massie witnesses their interaction and, overcome with jealousy, enlists the other members of her clique to start bullying Claire via harsh insults and cruel pranks.

Rejected by the Pretty Committee, Claire befriends Chris' eccentric younger sister Layne. The two make plans, which Claire later cancels to attend the Pretty Committee's weekend sleepover, which Massie's mom has invited her to. The girls continue to antagonize Claire at the sleepover, resulting in Claire leaving early. Massie later starts acting friendly toward Layne with the intent of obtaining more information about Chris.

One night, Claire visits Massie's room to confront her, but the latter is gone. Seeking revenge, Claire logs onto Massie's IM account and messages the other three girls pretending to be Massie; first tricking Alicia into dressing like Claire, then body shaming Dylan, and finally getting Kristen to confide that she is secretly poor and attends OCD on a scholarship, which is why she's constantly stressed about maintaining top grades. The girls subsequently eject Massie from the Pretty Committee and invite Claire to take her place.

After Kristen confronts Massie about the messages, the two deduce that Claire was the one behind them. The bullying starts anew, now greater in severity. Claire eventually breaks down in front of her mother, who encourages her to remain true to herself. Meanwhile, Massie decides to surprise Chris by jumping out of a pop out cake at her family's upcoming charity auction while wearing a shirt that reads "I Love Chris Abeley." Layne, having realized that Massie was just using her, makes amends with Claire, who apologizes for abandoning her and admits that she'd rather have a true friend than be friends with someone like Massie.

On a field trip to New York City, the Pretty Committee tries to sell a makeup line created by Kristen for a school project, but their recipe contains peanut oil, triggering allergic reactions in their classmates. Amidst the panic, Massie anonymously texts Claire, suggesting she use Layne's oatmeal to reduce the swelling. This proves successful, and all the other students regard Claire as a hero. Kristen thanks her and admits she's glad she told Claire her secret rather than Massie.

At the charity auction, Claire reaches out to Alicia and Dylan, who accept her apology and commend her for her efforts to stand up to Massie, revealing that they secretly harbor resentment for Massie's cruel and controlling nature as well. After learning that Chris has a girlfriend, Claire prevents Massie from jumping out of the cake to save her from embarrassment. Massie thanks her, and admits that she targeted Claire because she feared her friends would pick Claire over her otherwise. That night, Massie types a note on her computer that Claire is now welcome in the Pretty Committee, smiling to herself.

== Cast ==
- Ellen Marlow as Claire Lyons
- Elizabeth McLaughlin as Massie Block
- Bridgit Mendler as Kristen Gregory
- Samantha Boscarino as Alicia Rivera
- Sophie Anna Everhard as Dylan Marvil
- Vanessa Marano as Layne Abeley
- Keli Price as Chris Abeley
- Dylan Minnette as Todd Lyons
- Elizabeth Keifer as Judi Lyons
- David Chisum as William Block
- Julie Lauren as Kendra Block
- Boris McGiver as Isaac
- Angel Desai as Nurse Adele
- Elizabeth Gillies as Shelby Wexler
- Neal Matarazzo as Jay Lyons
- Camila Vignaud as Fawn

== Production ==
Filming began in February 2008 in Rhode Island and ended in March 2008.

== Reception ==
On Common Sense Media, Joly Herman gave the film three of five stars, praising the acting while calling it "materialistic".

== Soundtrack ==
The Clique

Soundtrack album by various artists
- Released: November 11, 2008
- Length: 41:58
- Label: Razor & Tie

The accompanying soundtrack album was released on November 11, 2008, by Razor & Tie.

Track listing

| No. | Title | Performer(s) | Length |
|---|---|---|---|
| 1. | "Here with Me Now" (Theme from The Clique) | Clique Girlz | 3:11 |
| 2. | "Break It Down" | Free & Easy | 3:20 |
| 3. | "Ur Perfect" | Juliet Shatkin | 3:38 |
| 4. | "Find My Place" | Samantha Boscarino | 2:50 |
| 5. | "Go" | Rebecca Jones | 3:19 |
| 6. | "Ayo Ayo" | Chris Classic | 2:17 |
| 7. | "Look but Don't Touch" | Juliet Shatkin | 3:07 |
| 8. | "Get Up and Go" | Alana D | 3:21 |
| 9. | "Commit Me" | Alana D | 2:38 |
| 10. | "So Dangerous" | Alana D | 2:58 |
| 11. | "Get Ur Good Time On" | The DeeKompressors | 2:55 |
| 12. | "That Girl" | The DeeKompressors | 2:44 |
| 13. | "Hypnotique" | Free & Easy | 3:17 |
| 14. | "What U Say" | The DeeKompressors | 2:23 |
| Total length: | | | 41:58 |

Songs that are not included on the soundtrack album:

- "Heaven on Earth" by Free & Easy
- "My Own Band" by Mellow Dee
- "What You Say" by Mellow Dee
- "Psycho 4 U" by CanDee Land
- "String Quartet No. 18" by Franz Schubert
