= She Fought Alone =

1995 television film

- DVD cover
- Genre: Drama
- Written by: John Leekley
- Directed by: Christopher Leitch
- Starring: Tiffani-Amber Thiessen; Brian Austin Green David Lipper
- Theme music composer: Dan Wool
- Country of origin: United States
- Original language: English

Production
- Executive producer: Bonnie Raskin
- Producers: John Leekley; Jay Benson
- Production locations: Austin, Texas; Lockhart, Texas
- Cinematography: Robert Primes
- Editor: John Duffy
- Running time: 87 min.
- Production companies: Bonnie Raskin Productions; Granite House Inc. NBC Productions

Original release
- Network: NBC
- Release: November 6, 1995

She Fought Alone is a 1995 American television film directed by Christopher Leitch. The film, which is based on a true story, stars Tiffani-Amber Thiessen and Brian Austin Green, who were known for Saved by the Bell and Beverly Hills, 90210 respectively, at the time of release. It was released on Region 2 DVD in 2000 and Region 1 in 2004.

== Plot ==
Caitlin Rose is a shy and bullied 17-year-old in the new town of Lockhart, Illinois. She is not very well known at her school, but with the help of her best friend, she is accepted into the popular group at school, known as The Crew. While partying one night, she bonds with Ethan, and eventually she's sleeping with him while being secretly watched by his best friend, Jace. Acting under peer pressure, she soon starts to rebel, neglecting school and getting into trouble. A lot of the teachers are bothered by The Crew’s behavior, complaining to administrators that they get away with everything, but to no avail.

While at the movies one night, Caitlin finds out Ethan is dating another girl. Upset, she confronts him. Trying to keep up a tough image, he claims they were never serious, but she responds that she sees right through him before leaving. Back at home, she receives a visit from Jace, who lies his way into her home by saying that he wants to comfort her. Inside, he tries to kiss her, but when she refuses, he rapes her while her little sister, Junie, listens through the door, unaware that her older sister is being assaulted.

The next day, she distances herself from everyone, not wanting to talk to her mother, Avon. When Avon demands to know what happened last night, Caitlin admits that Jace raped her. However, Avon doesn't believe Caitlin, claiming that she probably seduced him. Feeling betrayed, she leaves home, only to be told the same by her friends. She directly accuses Jace of rape, but nobody believes her, and the rest of Caitlin's friends soon turn their back on her. Determined to prove she is not lying, she goes to the hospital for an examination, but the doctors can't find any sign of rape because of the fact she was already sexually active before being raped. Nevertheless, Avon decides to believe her and offers to press charges, but Caitlin responds she just wants to forget everything that happened.

She is soon troubled with nightmares, and at school, people start bullying her. At first, she considers dropping out, but she soon realizes she could be able to stop it by winning over Ethan's trust. She is unable to, however, and the harassing continues. This results in Caitlin getting into a fight with another girl, Hanna, who is subsequently suspended, for fighting Caitlin, writing graffiti, and arguing with a teacher. Her mother threatens to go to the mass media, which angers the principal. Trying to prevent the school from getting a bad reputation, she suspends Ethan and Jace from two football games. As revenge for the suspension, the group lure Caitlin into an abandoned house and assault her, cutting off her hair as a "punishment". However, Ethan sees how scared she is and lets her go. Devastated, Caitlin decides to fight back, calling an investigator the next day, and the two begin collecting evidence and preparing to sue the school.

Meanwhile, Jace reveals to Ethan that he indeed raped Caitlin. Stunned by this revelation, Ethan makes amends with Caitlin. Feeling betrayed by his best friend, Jace starts vandalizing Ethan's property and car. Ethan picks up Caitlin, ready to flee the town, but they are stopped by the rest of The Crew. During the ensuing commotion, a knife fight breaks out between Ethan and Jace, which ends with Jace being stabbed in the leg, after which Ethan leaves with Caitlin. A court trial follows, during which the school district promises to update its policies. Jace testifies he will never play college football because of muscle damage sustained in the knife fight, and that he's ready to move on with his life and go to a state college. Caitlin leaves town for college, but expresses hope of one day returning to see Ethan and her friend Abby, who is pregnant with Jace's baby.

== Cast ==
- Tiffani-Amber Thiessen as Caitlin Rose
- Brian Austin Green as Ethan
- Isabella Hofmann as Avon Rose
- David Lipper as Jace
- Maureen Flannigan as Abby
- Keith MacKechnie as Aaron
- Jessie Robertson as Junie Rose
- Ashley Jones as Susan

== International titles ==
- Brazil - Luta Solitária
- France - L'Affront
- Germany - Mißbrauchte Träume
- Greece - Μόνη απέναντι στο ψέμα
- Norway - Ensom kamp
- Sweden - Sanningens pris
- Portugal - Só Contra Tudo
- Spain - Sola contra todos
- Italy - La ragazza di tutti
