= David Lipper =

Canadian actor

- Lipper in 2026
- Born: Montreal, Quebec, Canada
- Education: Emerson College
- Occupations: Actor, director, producer, writer
- Years active: 1987–present
- Known for: Viper in Full House

David Lipper is a Canadian actor, director, producer and writer. He is best known for his role as Viper in the ABC television sitcom Full House (1994–1995). His other roles include Jace in the television film She Fought Alone (1995), Robert Trump in Trump Unauthorized (2006), Amos in the television miniseries Sons of Liberty (2015) and Robbie Womack in the television series Frequency (2017).

== Early life ==
He grew up in Montreal and moved to Los Angeles after completing his BFA in Musical Theater from Emerson College in Boston.

== Career ==
=== Acting ===
Lipper made his first screen appearance when he appeared in the 1988 television series Time of Your Life.

Lipper appeared as Viper, DJ Tanner's boyfriend, in the final season of ABC television sitcom Full House, a role in which he reprised in Fuller House. He then appeared as the sadistic character of Brian Austin Green's character's best friend Jace in the 1995 film She Fought Alone.

He appeared in films such as Dante's Peak, Bug Buster, The Pacifier and Two Jacks. He appeared as Bob Deacon in the action film Dying of the Light.

=== Producing ===
In 2021, Lipper and Robert A. Daley Jr founded their production company Latigo Films, which Creative Artists Agency had signed them. The company's first film was the romantic comedy film My Favorite Girlfriend, which Saban Films distributed and released in select theaters on August 5, 2021. The company will produce upcoming films, including the noir film Joe Baby, featuring Ron Perlman, Willa Fitzgerald, Dichen Lachman and Harvey Keitel, the action-thriller film Hunt Club, featuring Mena Suvari and Mickey Rourke, and another action-thriller film Murder at Hollow Creek, where he will also star. In his interview, Lipper stated: "We are absolutely thrilled to be working with CAA, and we look forward to connecting with all the agents and talent there to create the best possible movies we can".

=== Directing ===
In 2021, he made his directing debut when he directed the film Death Link. The following year he released The Curse of Wolf Mountain and in 2024, released Murder at Hollow Creek. In 2025 he released Neglected. Lipper also acted in all four films.

== Filmography ==
=== Film ===
Year	Title	Role	Notes
1991	Nobody Can Hear You Scream		
1997	Dante's Peak	Hot Springs Man	
1998	Bug Buster	Steve Williams	
2001	Wrong Number	Michael Bartlett	
2004	Yard Sale	Harry Atwater	
2005	The Pacifier	Cute Cop	
2010	Beautiful Boy	Radio Reporter Voice / Television Ranter	
2012	Plan B	Tunnel Gangster	Short film
2012	Two Jacks	Hotel Clerk	
2012	Seventeen Hours In	Kevin	Short film
2014	Love by Design	Lance	
2014	Dying of the Light	Bob Deacon	
2015	Pioneers' Palace	Kevin	
2015	Lost After Dark	Adrienne's Father	
2015	Exodus to Shanghai	Kurt	
2016	High Strung	Sam the Stage Manager	
2016	The Unwilling	David Harris	
2019	Sleeping with My Student	Ben Sullivan	
2020	Reboot Camp	Seymour / Gordon St. Pierre	
2021	Death Link	Peter	Also director
2021	Just Swipe	Brandon / Daniel	
2021	Painted Beauty	Detective Carter	
2022	Hunt Club	Conrad	
2022	The Curse of Wolf Mountain	Max	Also director
2023	Place of Bones	Ed Singleterry	
2024	Murder at Hollow Creek	Detective Mullen	Also director
2024	Crescent City	Mystery Person	Also producer
2025	Off the Grid	Eddie	
2025	Wingman	Nothing	
2025	Cash Collectors	Casey Gunner	
2025	Neglected	Mayor Richards	
2026	Carousel	—N/a	Producer only
TBA	Candy Flip	David	Post-production
TBA	The Good Samaritan	—N/a	Producer only

=== Television ===
Year	Title	Role	Notes
1988–1989	Time of Your Life	Kevin Waters	Unknown episodes
1992	Step by Step	Boy #1	Episode: "Country Club"
1993	A Place to Be Loved	Robert Russ	Television movie
1993	Silk Stalkings	Greg	Episode: "Daddy Dearest"
1994	Moment of Truth: Broken Pledges	Chuck Stenzel	Television movie
1994	ABC Afterschool Special	Steve Cooper	Episode: "Boys Will Be Boys"
1994–1995	Full House	Viper	4 episodes
1995	A Dream Is a Wish Your Heart Makes: The Annette Funicello Story	Paul Anka	Television movie
1995	She Fought Alone	Jace	Television movie
1995	Family Values	Jimmy Huck	Television movie
1996–1999	Hot Rod Boys	Todd Huard (voice)	Unknown episodes
1997	Love's Deadly Triangle: The Texas Cadet Murder	David Graham	Television movie
1997	Crisis Center	Andy	Episode: "He Said, She Said"
1999	Misguided Angels	Kenneth McKinley	8 episodes
2002	Federal Protection	Denny Kirkindall	Television movie
2002	Doc	Alex	Episode: "Stroke of Luck"
2002	Mutant X	Vic Morelli	Episode: "Body and Soul"
2003	Threshold	Matt Bailey	Television movie
2003	This Time Around	Martin	Television movie
2003	See Jane Date	Ethan Miles	Television movie
2004	Tru Calling	Donnie	Episode: "Two Weddings and a Funeral"
2004	I Do (But I Don't)	Brad	Television movie
2005	NCIS	Sergeant Roger Caine	Episode: "Caught on Tape"
2005	Trump Unauthorized	Robert Trump	Television movie
2005	Ghost Whisperer	Josh	Episode: "Ghost Bride"
2006	Black Widower	Eddy Amos	Television movie
2009	Cra$h & Burn	Dr. Klein	Episode: "Trust"
2011	The Young and the Restless	Martin	Episode: "Complications Arise with Lucy"
2013	Non-Stop	Nicolas	Television movie
2015	Sons of Liberty	Amos	3 episodes Television miniseries
2016	Viper from Full House Pitches to Netflix	Viper	Television movie
2016–2020	Fuller House	Viper	Episodes: "DJ and Kimmy's High School Reunion" and "Our Very Last Show, Again"
2017	Frequency	Robbie Womack	3 episodes
2017	Or Die Trying	Colton Reed	Episode: "This Is War"
2018	Scorpion	Stevie	Episode: "Dork Day Afternoon"
2018	Code Black	Steven Martinelli	Episode: "La Familia"
2021	A Christmas Letter	David Marino	Television movie
