= Reboot Camp =

- Directed by: Ivo Raza
- Written by: Ivo Raza
- Produced by: David Lipper; Tina Sutakanat; James Johnston; David Lipper
- Starring: David Koechner; David Lipper; Chaz Bono; Keli Price; Shar Jackson; Ed Begley Jr.; Maya Stojan; Pierson Fodé; Lindsey Shaw
- Cinematography: Derrick Cohan
- Edited by: Ivo Raza
- Music by: Erick Schroder
- Production company: Northern Productions
- Distributed by: Freestyle Entertainment
- Release dates: October 2020 (Austin Film Festival); May 4, 2021
- Running time: 97 minutes
- Country: United States
- Language: English

Reboot Camp is an American satirical comedy film written and directed by Ivo Raza. It premiered at the 2020 Austin Film Festival where it won the Comedy Vanguard Audience Award for best comedy film. It also won best narrative feature award at the 2020 Maui Film Festival and best comedy at the 2021 Garden State Film Festival and best comedy at CINEQUEST 2021. The film features an ensemble cast including David Lipper, Lindsey Shaw, Keli Price, Ja Rule, Chaz Bono, David Koechner, Eric Roberts, Maya Stojan, Shar Jackson and Ed Begley Jr.

== Plot ==
The mockumentary follows brothers and filmmakers Danny and Seymour Gordon who create Reboot Camp, a fake self-help group, and its leader Gordon to expose the exploitive practices of fake gurus and how easy it is to con people into believing just about anything. To their surprise, their absurd Reboot Camp becomes a big success with a devoted following and turns into an actual cult. As the camp grows with more members and celebrities, the brothers run out of funds and the producer pushes them to hire his niece Claire. Reluctant at first, she eventually sees a golden opportunity to make money and causes a rift between the brothers.

== Cast ==
- David Koechner as himself
- Keli Price as Danny
- Ed Begley Jr. as John Lehman
- Maya Stojan as Claire
- Pierson Fodé as Keith
- Lindsey Shaw as Maisey
- Chaz Bono as Herbert
- Shar Jackson as Antina Mooney
- Daniel Nguyen as Jimmy
- Eddie McClintock as Cooper
- Nicole Aniston as herself
- Maxim Roy as Grace
- Eric Roberts as himself
- Ximena Córdoba as Margot
- Billy Morrison as himself
- David Lipper as Seymour / Gordon St. Pierre
- Stacey Liane Jackson as herself
- Rachelle Carson as Mira Lehman
- June Lee as Ysable
- Jessica Belkin as Ruby
- Melanie Marden as Tiffany
- Eliza Roberts as herself
- Ja Rule as himself

== Production ==
=== Development and production ===
Reboot Camp was written and directed by independent filmmaker Ivo Raza. It was produced by David Lipper and Tina Sutakanat, executive producers Bernard Azer, Alan Braverman and Tim Alek. Additional producers include James Johnston, David Roberson, and Keli Price.

=== Filming ===
The film was shot at various locations around Los Angeles, including Woodland Hills, Mulholland Drive, Santa Clarita, Venice Beach and Studio City. The cinematographer was Derrick Cohan.

== See also ==
- List of films featuring fictional films
