= Hunt Club (film) =

- Directed by: Elizabeth Blake-Thomas
- Written by: David Lipper; John F. Saunders
- Produced by: David Lipper; Robert A. Daly Jr. Mark Lester; Keli Price; Kipp Tribble
- Starring: Mena Suvari; Mickey Rourke; Casper Van Dien
- Production company: Latigo Films
- Distributed by: Uncork'd Entertainment
- Release date: April 4, 2023
- Running time: 87 minutes
- Country: United States
- Language: English

Hunt Club is a 2023 American action thriller film written by David Lipper and John F. Saunders, directed by Elizabeth Blake-Thomas and starring Mena Suvari, Mickey Rourke and Casper Van Dien.

== Plot summary ==
A group of male hunters lure women to their island with the chance to win one hundred thousand dollars in a hunt, only to discover that they are the hunted, but this time they mess with the wrong girls and must deal with the consequences.

== Cast ==
- Mena Suvari as Cassandra
- Mickey Rourke as Virgil
- Casper Van Dien as Carter
- Maya Stojan as Tessa
- Will Peltz as Jackson
- Jessica Belkin as Lexi
- Jeremy London as Preston
- Jason London as Teddy
- David Lipper as Conrad
- Kipp Tribble as Williams

== Production ==
In July 2022, it was announced that filming wrapped in Mississippi.

== Release ==
In March 2023, it was announced that Uncork'd Entertainment acquired American distribution rights to the film. It was released on April 4, 2023 in the United States and Canada.

== Reception ==
The film has a 25% rating on Rotten Tomatoes based on reviews from 8 critics.

Will Sayre of MovieWeb gave the film a negative review, calling it an "uneven and often hard-to-watch B-movie."
