= Elizabeth McLaughlin =

American actress

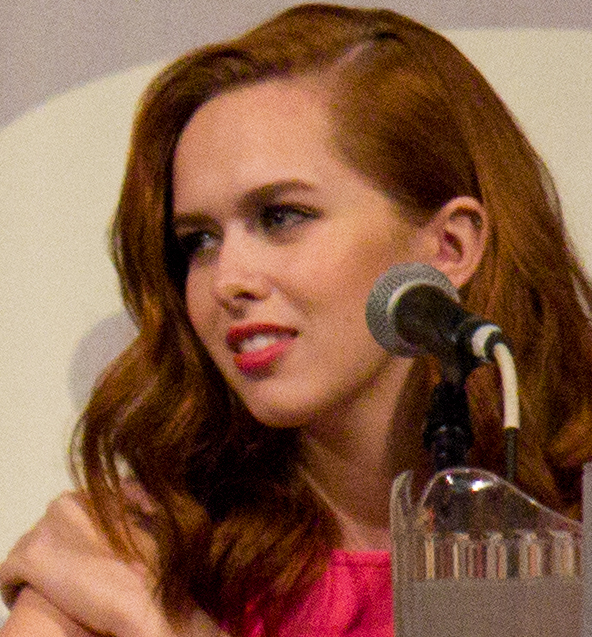
- McLaughlin at 2015
- Occupation: Actress
- Years active: 2008–present

Elizabeth McLaughlin is an American actress. She is known for playing Massie Block in The Clique and Valerie McAllister in the ABC television drama Betrayal.

== Life and career ==
McLaughlin has been a member of SAG-AFTRA's Los Angeles Local Board of Directors since 2013, running under the Unite for Strength slate.

== Filmography ==
Film roles
Year	Title	Role	Notes
2008	The Clique	Massie Block	Direct-to-video film
2012	Stakeout	Cyd Moss	Short film
2016	Dead South	Philomenia	
2018	Big Kill	Josie Strong	

Television roles
Year	Title	Role	Notes
2008	Ugly Betty	Lindsay	Episode: "Zero Worship"
2010	November Christmas	Tammy	Television film
2010	First Day	Sasha	8 episodes
2011	Home Game	Julia	Unsold television pilot
2011	Melissa & Joey	Kelsey Moncreif	Episode: "Lost in Translation"
2011	Dexter	Grant's Daughter	Episode: "Ricochet Rabbit"
2013–2014	Betrayal	Valerie McAllister	Main role
2014–2017	Hand of God	Alicia Hopkins	Main role; 20 episodes
2015	Pretty Little Liars	Lesli Stone	3 episodes
2015	Perception	Cressida Gardner	Episode: "Romeo"
2016	Lethal Weapon	Rachel	Episode: "Ties That Bind"
2018	Code Black	Lana	Episode: "Only Human"
2019	Grand Hotel	Heather Davis	5 episodes

Web series roles
Year	Title	Role	Notes
2010	First Day	Sasha	8 episodes
