= Battle of the Bands (The Naked Brothers Band) =

- The Naked Brothers Band episodes
- Episode nos.: Season 1 Episodes 11 & 12
- Directed by: Polly Draper
- Written by: Will McRobb and Chris Viscardi
- Cinematography by: Ken H. Keller
- Editing by: Craig Cobb
- Production code: 110-111/ 999
- Original air date: October 6, 2007 (Note: The episode was first released in Battle of the Bands DVD on September 4, 2007.)

Guest appearances
- Keli Price as Bobby Love; Matt Pinfield as himself

Episode chronology
← Previous "The Song"	Next → "Alien Clones"

"Battle of the Bands" is the eleventh and twelfth episodes of the first season of the musical comedy television series The Naked Brothers Band on Nickelodeon. It was first released direct-to-DVD on September 4, 2007 and later aired as a television movie special on the network on October 6, 2007 to 3.8 million viewers, which was among the highest rated for the week for children in the 6-11 and 9-14 age groups.

The TV movie episode follows the series' format of a rock-mockumentary. Battle of the Bands is written by Will McRobb and Chris Viscardi and directed by Polly Draper, who is also the showrunner and mother to the show's stars Nat Wolff and Alex Wolff, the lead singer-songwriter and drummer, respectively. Keli Price guest stars as Bobby Love, a manipulative con artist and the leader of the punk rock group The LA Surfers.

== Plot ==
The Naked Brothers Band and another rock group, The LA Surfers compete in a “Battle of the Bands” charity event benefiting Little Kids Rock, a nonprofit organization that provides free instruments and lessons to children in low-income cities.

Rosalina, aged 13, starts to develop feelings for The LA Surfers' 16-year-old lead singer, Bobby Love. Nat and Alex Wolff, aged 11 and 8, respectively, learn his false intentions while in the bathroom, as Nat is trying to wash out the orange hair dye he put on as part of his latte-drinking bad boy image that he attempted to pull off to impress Rosalina. Nat did this after seeing a video online of Bobby riding a motorcycle earlier that day.

Nat then says he will try to get along with Bobby, but as Bobby enters the bathroom, Nat and Alex hide in a stall. Much to the siblings' dismay, they discover that Bobby is a con artist and is just hitting on Rosalina to deceive The Naked Brothers Band. It turns out that Bobby speaks in a faux British accent, does not write his own songs, stamps his signatures, and his birth name is Robert.

Bobby even misleads TV reporter Matt Pinfield into believing that it is "Nat [who] takes credit for the songs he does not write," an anonymous claim Pinfield telecasts on the news.

At the pre-concert for Little Kids Rock, Nat asks Bobby to confess his lies, and he does not. Instead, Bobby continues to flirt with Rosalina and call Nat "Nate", which angers him. Alex confronts Bobby and steps on his foot, causing a physical fight. During the dispute, Nat declares that the benefit concert is now a battle of the bands, and whoever loses has to give all their profits from their next CD to the charity.

Cooper Pillot, the 11-year-old manager of The Naked Brothers Band, arranges a meeting with Ms. Patty Scoggins, the girl representative of Little Kids Rock, to formally apologize for the altercation. He offers them a famous band in Europe called The Honey Bunnies, which actually consists of Nat and Alex's father, Mr. Wolff, and his girlfriend Betty singing, as well as playing the accordion and ukulele, respectively. She approves them as the opening act for the event.

Bobby and his band later try to compose new songs for the concert. Since Bobby inadvertently fired the person who writes all their music, they find this task to be quite challenging. He comes up with mediocre songs titled "My Feet Are So Nice" and "I Love My Hair". The band's guitarist opposes the songs, while his girlfriend Rita deems them as rather silly. Bobby argues that it is not Rita's decision and that "[she] knows nothing," as she is "not even in the band."

Nat still fails at getting Rosalina to realize the truth about Bobby's persona. While rehearsing the song "L.A." that Nat wrote for the event, he and the other band members keep ridiculing Bobby by referring to him as "a big fat phony liar," which leads to Rosalina quitting the band.

Rosalina seeks out Bobby to gain insight into what her former bandmates think of him. Bobby tries to deceive her further with advice, such as saying, "Have you ever noticed that the word 'lousy' is in the word 'jealousy'? That's because jealousy makes you feel lousy," but Rosalina reminds him that he already told her that the other day. She also becomes skeptical of Bobby's apparent bluff when she attempts to clarify which part of England he is from.

Bobby inquires if Rosalina is holding onto the music from The Naked Brothers Band. Feeling that she "won't be needing it since [she] quit the band," Bobby tosses it in the trash. He endeavors to kiss her, but she refuses, stating that she is "confused" and walks away. After Rosalina leaves, Bobby purloins her music sheet.

Backstage at the concert, Bobby begins a hostile discussion with Nat by expressing his sorrow over Rosalina's departure from the band, though alleging he "comforted her in her hour of need and she's a good kisser too." Nat loses his temper and tackles Bobby to the floor. He is initially losing the fight until Alex suddenly appears, scaring Bobby away with a balloon that a young girl gave to him.

The Honey Bunnies open the show, but the audience strongly dislikes the song. Nevertheless, backstage, a European producer approach Mr. Wolff and Betty telling them that he was actually impressed by their performance. Soon after, The LA Surfers play Nat's song "L.A.", which distresses Rosalina in the audience. She heads backstage to explain to The Naked Brothers Band that Bobby stole the song. Rosalina hugs Nat while sobbing in his arms, as he forgives her apology.

Noticing a net of balloons above the curtains, Rosalina yearns that "all of the balloons were made of cement and they would fall on Bobby Love's big, fat, phony head." Then, Alex reminds Nat that he fears balloons. Rosalina pulls the rope, releasing the balloons. Balloons descend upon Bobby and his band members, which causes him (in a non-British accent) to panic in fear for his mother and jump on his bandmate, Pork, shouting: "I'm not playing games! They're touching my face!"

Amid Bobby's breakdown, Cooper and Patty show footage of The Naked Brothers Band recording the music video for the song “L.A.” on the projector screen. Seeing this, Matt Pinfield, who previously supported The LA Surfers, gives an explanation of what happened: The LA Surfers stole the song from The Naked Brothers Band, and Bobby Love "has been faking a British accent all along. He's really balloon fearing surfer dude Robert Love from California. I repeat: Bobby Love is afraid of balloons, and is from San Diego" before chanting with the audience that "Bobby is a thief!"

The LA Surfers are booed off of the stage and gather at the dressing room. Bobby shares his resentment towards having to donate all the money from their next CD to, what he calls, the "stupid" charity. Nonetheless, Rita points out that due to their poor performance that evening, the band will most likely not be releasing another album. Bobby hides his face in his hands, coming to terms with his defeat.

Meanwhile, backstage, Nat teaches Rosalina the bass chords to his new song "Girl Of My Dreams".

Nat and his band appear on stage. He dedicates the new song to Rosalina, and he recalls writing it on the piano when he felt heartbroken, but acknowledged how he can now sing it happily. The Naked Brothers Band perform "Girl Of My Dreams" and win the battle of the bands.

== Cast ==
Actor	Character	Character overview
Nat Wolff	self	Aged 11; The lead singer/songwriter and keyboardist for The Naked Brothers Band.
Alex Wolff	self	Aged 8; Brother of Nat Wolff and The Naked Brothers Band's lead drummer.
David Levi	self	Aged 11; Keyboardist for The Naked Brothers Band.
Thomas Batuello	self	Aged 11; Cellist for The Naked Brothers Band
Cooper Pillot	self	Aged 11; Band manager for The Naked Brothers Band, who wears a suit and large sunglasses.
Allie DiMeco	Rosalina	Aged 13; Bassist for The Naked Brothers Band.
Qaasim Middleton	self	Aged 10; Guitarist for The Naked Brothers Band.
Michael Wolff	Dad/Mr. Wolff/Sonny	Father of Nat and Alex. Accordionist and singer for The Hunny Bunnies.
Jesse Draper	Jesse Cook	Aged 20; The Naked Brothers Band's babysitter and tutor.
Catherine Curtin	Betty	Mr. Wolff's girl friend, Ukulele player and singer for The Honey Bunnies.
Matt Pinfield	self	Television news reporter
Keli Price	Bobby Love	Aged 16; Lead singer of the LA Surfers
Emily Richardson	Patty Scoggins	Representative for Little Kids Rock
Grant Monohon	Pork	Bassist for The LA Surfers
Lyle Mackston	Drummer	Drummer for The LA Surfers
Ty Daniel Smith	Guitarist	Guitarist for The LA Surfers
Karen DiConectto	Rita	Girlfriend of The LA Surfers' guitarist

== Reception ==
Common Sense Media awarded it a dim 2 stars, citing an “unrealistic plot”. It also recommends a showing age of 10+ because of some inappropriate content.

It was the number-one show for the week of October 6 for children ages 6–14, with 3.8 million viewers.
