= November Christmas =

- Promotional poster
- Written by: P'Nenah Goldstein; Greg Coppa
- Directed by: Robert Harmon
- Starring: Sam Elliott; Karen Allen; John Corbett; Sarah Paulson; Emily Alyn Lind
- Country of origin: United States
- Original language: English

Production
- Producers: David A. Rosemont; Cameron Johann
- Cinematography: Attila Szalay
- Production company: Hallmark Hall of Fame

Original release
- Network: CBS
- Release: November 28, 2010

Related
- When Love Is Not Enough: The Lois Wilson Story; The Lost Valentine

November Christmas is a 2010 American made-for-television Christmas drama film based on a short story written by Greg Coppa. The film depicts a young couple struggling with the illness of their daughter, and the effect their family had on the small, rural community they have become a part of. The film was shot in Nova Scotia. It was presented through Hallmark Hall of Fame, and premiered on CBS on November 28, 2010.

== Plot ==
A small Rhode Island community comes together to create special holiday (Halloween, Thanksgiving Day, and Christmas) moments several weeks early for Vanessa Marks, an 8-year-old girl with a life-threatening illness.

At the beginning of the film, Vanessa's father Tom (John Corbett) gives her a snow globe and inside that globe is another little girl holding a snow globe. Her mother Beth (Sarah Paulson) tells Vanessa that she has to shake the globe to make it snow. Vanessa is fascinated with the snow, having never seen it before, and wishes that she could see it for Christmas. Her father, hearing this, becomes concerned that Vanessa may not live to see December.

After Tom quietly asks Jess Sanford, a neighboring farmer (Sam Elliott) about buying pumpkins – and later Christmas trees – Jess figures out that Tom is trying to speed up the holidays so that Vanessa will have the best Christmas before she dies. Jess, while searching for pumpkins to surprise the Marks family, heals an old friendship that he had lost when his own son had died years ago, and is rewarded with an invitation to be his old friend's best man at the friend's upcoming wedding. Together, the two men sneak a truckload of pumpkins onto the family's front porch, much to the surprise of Vanessa who decides she wants to have a Halloween party. Beth tries to explain that it is too early, but Tom agrees to the party and Vanessa (and her younger brother Gordon) begin to plan their Halloween costumes.

As a show of appreciation, Tom goes to the Sanford home and invites him and his wife Claire to the party. Jess goes to town and mentions it to Tammy, a young waitress (Elizabeth McLaughlin) at the local restaurant whom Vanessa had befriended. Later, Jess gives Tom a box of Halloween decorations to help decorate the family's house, and on the night of the party Tammy arrives with all the town's children to help celebrate. Vanessa (who was prohibited from going to school and meeting other children because of her illness) is overjoyed at having so many playmates and friends. Jess, Claire, and his friend and his new wife follow carrying trays of food. Tammy tries her skills as a storyteller and tells a ghost story that makes the children scream and laugh.

Together, Jess, his old friend, and Tammy help the family celebrate Halloween - and each holiday thereafter - a month early, and in doing so unite an entire community and teach everyone that what really matters in life is love.

As Vanessa and her family return home one night from a particularly sorrowful hospital visit, they find that the neighbors have decorated their homes and streets with brilliant lights and holiday decorations a full month early. Jess, his friend, and the neighboring community line the family's driveway to greet Vanessa as she arrives home; her own house covered in beautiful lights. Everyone is invited inside the home to celebrate with food given by the town's local restaurant, and later, Vanessa runs outside with her snow globe just as an early snow begins to fall, duplicating the little girl inside the globe.

Later, Tammy writes a children's book about Vanessa's life, with pictures that Vanessa had made herself during her illness. Fifteen years after the story, a young woman (reading Tammy's book to children at the local library) explains that she is Vanessa, now all grown-up and perfectly healthy, revealing that she had survived her illness after that early Christmas. Afterwards, she goes to the Sanfords' Christmas tree lot where she reunites with her family and Jess himself; to select the town's annual tree.

== Cast ==
- Sam Elliott as Jess Sanford
- Karen Allen as Claire Sanford
- John Corbett as Tom Marks
- Sarah Paulson as Beth Marks
- Max Charles as Gordon Marks
- Emily Alyn Lind as Young Vanessa
- Elizabeth McLaughlin as Tammy
- Tegan Moss as Adult Vanessa
- Tyler Burns as Adult Gordon

== Sequel ==
Greg Coppa wrote a short story sequel to November Christmas titled "A Partridge in a Persimmon Tree".

== See also ==
- List of Christmas films
