= Monster High: Ghoul Spirit =

2011 video game

- North American cover art for Wii
- Developer: ImaginEngine
- Publishers: THQ; Little Orbit (2014 re-issue)
- Series: Monster High
- Platforms: Nintendo DS, Wii
- Release: NA: October 25, 2011; AU: November 10, 2011; EU: November 11, 2011
- Genre: Party game
- Mode: Single-player

Monster High: Ghoul Spirit is a 2011 party video game developed by ImaginEngine and published by THQ in October 2011. It was developed for the Nintendo DS and Wii consoles. The game is based on Monster High by Mattel.

In 2014, the game was later re-issued by Little Orbit for the North American market.

== Gameplay ==
Monster High: Ghoul Spirit is a digital game that allows players to create their own student avatar to delve into the Monster High universe.

The game begins with allowing the main player to create their own avatar from six monsters: a combination of mash-up monster, vampire, werewolf, mummy, zombie, and gorgon. Players can customize their avatar's facial features, skin color, haircuts, outfits, and color designs. After creating the avatar, the player is spawned in the office of Headless Headmistress Bloodgood and must pick up their student ID from a nearby machine.

The main game is divided into six regular student missions: one secret student mission, one Freaky Flaw mission, and five assignments from the teachers. Each mission has its own unique and interactive experience, from puzzles and mini games, to fashion emergencies, offering hours of entertainment for players of all ages.

Equipped for user use in the game is a diary. The diary is a useful tool for players to keep track of their relationships with both students and teachers. The strength of the relationship with each character is indicated by the Ghoul Meter, a gauge that becomes increases as the player interacts with in-game characters. The diary also contains small notes about all 22 characters, including some exclusive information found only in Ghoul Spirit. Each student has a secret second note that can only be unlocked by entering a specific code.

== Reviews ==
- Common Sense Media
- Diehard GameFan
- Jeuxvideo.com
- TechnologyTell
- Jeuxvideo.com
