= The Curse of Wolf Mountain =

- Directed by: David Lipper
- Written by: Keli Price
- Produced by: David Lipper; Kipp Tribble; Keli Price; Joshua Santana; Kenny Yates
- Starring: Malú Trevejo; Tobin Bell; Danny Trejo
- Distributed by: Uncork’d Entertainment
- Release date: May 9, 2023
- Running time: 94 minutes
- Country: United States
- Language: English

The Curse of Wolf Mountain (formerly titled Wolf Mountain) is a 2023 American horror film written by Keli Price, directed by David Lipper, and starring Price, Lipper, Malú Trevejo, Tobin Bell and Danny Trejo.

== Plot ==
AJ is a young man who can’t recall the details of his parents’ deaths on Wolf Mountain 20 years ago. His psychiatrist, Dr. Avery, suggests AJ go back to the mountain to try to unlock his repressed memories.

Sam (AJ's wife) reveals that she's pregnant. AJ's older brother, Max, gifts him a katana. Sam, Max, Max’s wife Lexi, her sister Emma, and Emma's boyfriend James accompany AJ on the trip to Wolf Mountain.

AJ and the others arrive at the rangers' cabin, and Ranger Duffy tells them there is no cell phone service on the mountain. Ranger Dennis warns the group about the legend of a wolf-man in the area, dating back to the 1960s. The group hikes up and makes camp.

Two fugitive criminals, Eddie and Joe, are hiding out in the mountains’ woods. They come across the campers and act nonchalant, but the group finds them suspicious. The criminals return to the woods. AJ tells Sam that he has memories of a beast with the face of a wolf and the hands of a man killing his parents, and he fears for his sanity.

In the morning, AJ and Sam discover the others' tents are empty. When no one returns after several hours, Sam and AJ decide to hike down the mountain to get cell service. They can’t find a signal and get lost. James runs into them, explaining that he, Emma, Max, and Lexi went on a hike, and James became separated. They eventually find Emma and return to camp.

A murderer stalks the mountain, picking people off one by one: he strangles Eddie, kills James with a knife, and impales Emma with a spear. AJ and Sam find Emma's body and run away in terror. They get cell-service and call Sam’s cousin, Ric, for help. However, he can’t understand them because of the poor signal and the call drops.

Joe encounters AJ and Sam, and they witness Duffy’s murder. When the trio flees, they find a body covered in leaves and wearing Max’s boots.

Ric arrives at Wolf Mountain and searches for AJ and Sam. The murderer captures Ric and begins to torture him. AJ and Sam managed to free Ric. The murderer returns, and Joe dies when his head is crushed by a bear trap. AJ sees that the murderer is wearing a wolf mask; he realizes this is the same person who killed his parents. The murderer stabs Sam, but she gets away. AJ finds her and reassures her that she and the baby will survive.

Ric witnesses the murders of park rangers April and Dennis. He reaches his car and drives away to get help.

The murderer ambushes Sam and AJ. They restrain and unmask him to reveal Max. He admits to killing everyone, including Lexi. Max, who was adopted, explains that he was abused in foster care. After being adopted, his parents got pregnant with AJ, who was called “the miracle baby,” making Max feel like he didn’t matter anymore. Using the guise of the wolf-man, he killed their parents.

Max escapes his bonds and drags AJ to the top of Wolf Mountain, to the same cliff where their parents died. AJ tries to appeal to Max’s humanity, but he is unmoved. AJ fights back, and Max falls off the cliff. AJ returns to help Sam.

Months later, Dr. Avery commends AJ on the progress he’s made. Sam has given birth to their daughter, Sarah, and they are a happy family. Ric takes AJ to the airport for a business trip. During the drive, AJ thinks he sees Max in another car. AJ points out Max’s body was never found, so they hurry back to the house.

Max shows up at the house and holds Sam at gunpoint. When AJ and Ric return, Max threatens to kill Sam. Ric smashes a glass vase on Max's head, and AJ uses the katana to kill him.

== Cast ==
- Keli Price as A.J.
- Karissa Lee Staples as Sam
- David Lipper as Max
- Fernanda Romero as Lexi
- Malú Trevejo as Emma
- Matt Rife as James
- Eddie McClintock as Ric
- Danny Trejo as Eddie
- Tobin Bell as Dr. Avery
- Kenny Yates as Joe

== Production ==
The film was shot in Castaic, California, and wrapped in March, 2021.

== Release ==
In March 2023, it was announced that the U.S. distribution rights to the film were acquired by Uncork’d Entertainment. The film was released on VOD on May 9, 2023.

== Reception ==
Vicki Lawrence of Starburst awarded the film 2 stars out of 5, stating that it "felt like an oversaturated slasher, which wanted to throw in all of the tropes instead of picking and choosing specific aspects and moulding them into this film." Jim Morazzini of Nerdly also reviewed The Curse of Wolf Mountain, rating it at 1.5 out of 5, criticizing the film's script and writing that the killer's reveal was too obvious.
