= Monster High: Boomuda Triangle =

American comic book miniseries

Publication information
- Publisher: IDW Publishing
- Publication date: January 2026 –present

Creative team
- Written by: Megan Brown
- Artist(s): Lisa Sterle, Felia Hanakata, Bowen McCurdy
- Penciller: Eileen Widjaja
- Letterer: Johanna Nattalie
- Colorist: Bex Glendining

Monster High: Boomuda Triangle is an American comic book miniseries published by IDW Publishing between January and June 2026. The series is set in the fictional universe of the Monster High franchise. It is written by Megan Brown and illustrated by Eileen Widjaja.

== History ==
The website, The Beat, was given the exclusive opportunity to reveal the first covers and information about the miniseries in an article published on 20 December 2025. The comic series originated as a continuation of the story involving the gay couple Kieran Valentine and Spelldon Cauldronello, who had previously starred in a story in the same Monster High anthology, Monster High: Pride, and released earlier that same year. The first issue was the miniseries published on 28 January 2026

The miniseries is written by Megan Brown and illustrated by Eileen Widjaja. Bex Glendining served as the colorist for the series, while Johanna Nattalie was the letterer. Lisa Sterle created the main cover for the first issue, while artists Felia Hanakata and Bowen McCurdy produced variant covers, with McCurdy's cover specifically designed to imitate vintage paper dolls.

== Plot ==
The miniseries follows Kieran Valentine and Spelldon Cauldronello in their first solo comic. After Spelldon secures a unique internship with the Guardian of the Boomuda Triangle, a powerful magical location that maintains the balance between the known universes, his boyfriend, Kieran Valentine, becomes afraid that Spelldon might fall in love with the Guardian and end their relationship. As a result, Kieran secretly follows him to the Triangle, leading to an argument during which the two accidentally break the Atlas, a map of the known universes and their boundaries that regulates the Triangle's power.

The destruction of the Atlas causes all the universes to collide and converge, sending Kieran and Spelldon on an adventure in which they must overcome their insecurities, repair the rifts between worlds, and find each another again in every universe they visit.
