= Bug Buster =

- Directed by: Lorenzo Doumani
- Written by: Malick Khoury
- Produced by: Christian E. Dirkes; Lorenzo Doumani; Steven R. Stevens
- Starring: Randy Quaid; Brenda Epperson Doumani; Katherine Heigl; James Doohan; George Takei
- Cinematography: Hanania Baer
- Edited by: Lawrence J. Gleason
- Music by: Bobby Caldwell; Sidney James
- Distributed by: DMG Entertainment
- Release date: 1998
- Running time: 93 minutes
- Country: United States
- Language: English

Bug Buster is a 1998 American comedy horror film directed by Lorenzo Doumani. It is the only known film to be written by Malick Khoury. In the United Kingdom, this film was released under the title Some Things Never Die.

== Plot ==
After the mayor uses a potentially dangerous substance to protect the local plantation, the lakeside town of Mountview, in California, is attacked by a lethal species of large cockroach. After some of the town's inhabitants are killed, the mayor enlists the help of eccentric pest exterminator General George S. Merlin in order to prevent further harm to the local dwellers.

== Cast ==
- Randy Quaid as General George S. Merlin
- Brenda Epperson Doumani as Dr. Laura Casey
- Katherine Heigl as Shannon Griffin
- James Doohan as Sheriff Carlson
- George Takei as Dr. Hiro Fujimoto
- Meredith Salenger as Veronica Hart
- David Lipper as Steve Williams
- Doug Jones as The Mother Bug
- Tom Willett as Band Member

== Reception ==
Bug Buster received almost universally negative reviews from audiences and critics alike. Despite this, some viewers enjoyed it, seeing it as a throwback to the 1950s monster films. Robert Pardi of TV Guide said "this modestly budgeted effort has a certain low key charm."

== Home media ==
The film was released in the United States on VHS and DVD, Apr 13, 1999 by DMG Entertainment and again in 2000.

On February 13, 2007, it was released on DVD in the United States by Majestic Entertainment
