= Time of Your Life (1988 TV series) =

- Also known as: Campus
- Created by: Harry Jakobs and Maryse Wilder
- Country of origin: Canada
- No. of episodes: 130

Production
- Running time: 30 minutes

Original release
- Network: CTV (CFCF-TV)
- Release: October 17, 1988 – 1989

Time of Your Life is a Canadian television soap opera that ran from August 1988 to May 1989. It was created by producer Harry Jakobs and Maryse Wilder, Rhea Cohen and Maurice Thevenet. The series was loosely based on the low budget Canadian independent feature Rebel High (a modern 1980s High School Confidential). It debuted on October 17, 1988, and was aired right after the American soap opera General Hospital at 4pm, daily Monday through Friday replacing Bob Barker's The Price Is Right. Making it at the time Canada's first daily syndicated soap opera with all 130 episodes shot two weeks in advance to air date until completion of the first-season cliffhanger.

== Storylines ==
The series covered many subjects including drug use, rape, cults, suicide, alcoholism, bullying, abortion, pornography and homosexuality.

== Cast ==
- Jason Cavalier Leboeuf as Mickey
- Dawna Wightman as Phoebe
- Ara Carrera as Christine
- Kara Feifer as Lisa
- Scott Armstrong as James
- Alan Legros as Eddie
- David Lipper as Kevin
- Richard Raybourne as Matt
- Francoise Robertson as Laura
- Lana Higgins as Helen
- Desmond Gallant as Evan

== Production ==
The series was shot in Montreal, in a studio with built sets in an industrial lot warehouse on Royalmount and The Decarie Expressway near Montreal's racetrack Blue Bonnets and Orange Julep.

=== Crew ===
- Avinoam Damari .... director
- Stephen G Blanchard .... production manager
- Mark Feifer .... executive producer

=== Writers ===
The writing team experienced extreme turnover during the first (and only) season. The first lead writer, for example, remained with the show for only two weeks.

- Nancy Klein ... Lead Writer
- Evan Keliher ... Lead Writer
- Bryan Zako ... Lead Writer
- Stanley Whyte ... Writer
- Nick Rotari ... Writer
- Greg Lipper ... Writer

== Broadcast ==
The series was syndicated in French Quebecois, and in international markets such as Israel, France, Australia, and Mexico, including eastern parts of the United States under the title Campus.

== Trivia ==
- Cinar studios which is well known for producing award-winning animated children's series such as Caillou was where the French translations were post produced by Natalie Rosen.
- RDS CEO Dominic Vanelli was once a floor manager.
- Award-winning DOP David Franco (Graceland w Kevin Costner) was one of the first camera ops to become DOP on the series.
- The local hang out for the kids on the series was called Harry's Place, named after producer and co-creator Harry Jakobs.
- During mid-season, production stopped due to a strike by the cast who felt underpaid. The cast got a raise, and production resumed.
- The series was syndicated in Canada and around the world, becoming very popular in some countries.
