= Erin Soderberg =

American fiction writer and novelist

Erin Soderberg Downing
- Born: October 21, 1976 (age 49); Duluth, Minnesota
- Occupation: Writer
- Children: 3
- Writing career
- Pen name: Kate Howard, Nessi Monstrata
- Years active: 2000–present
- Website: www.erinsoderberg.com (books for kids, teens, adults) www.erinsoderberg.com (books for kids)

Erin Soderberg Downing (born October 21, 1976) is an American children's book author. She has written more than 75 books for children, tweens, and adults.

== Biography ==
Erin Soderberg Downing was born October 21, 1976, in Duluth, Minnesota. She grew up in Duluth and later studied at the University of Minnesota, before becoming a children's book editor and marketer while studying for her Master's in Business Administration at NYU in New York City, and also at Stockholm School of Economics in Sweden. Returning to the United States, she took assignments in marketing for various companies around New York City, including Nickelodeon.

In 2000, Soderberg Downing started editing and contributing to several children's books brands, including the Scooby-Doo picture clue books series, published by Scholastic. After settling in Minneapolis, Minnesota, she started writing her own novels. Soderberg Downing soon began developing several series of children's books, starting with the beloved magical middle-grade series THE QUIRKS (2012–2015), followed by the popular PUPPY PIRATES chapter books (Random House, 2014–2019), "DISNEY'S DARING DREAMERS CLUB" (Random House, 2019-2021), "THE GREAT PEACH EXPERIMENT" (Pixel + Ink, 2021-2024), and "JUST LIKE HOME" (Scholastic, 2026-). She has also written many bestselling and highly-acclaimed standalone middle grade novels, including "WHAT HAPPENED THEN," "JUST KEEP WALKING," "MOON SHADOW," "BEST FRIENDS (UNTIL SOMEONE BETTER COMES ALONG)," and the 2022 novel "CONTROLLED BURN" (Scholastic).

In 2012 she wrote the first book in The Quirks series, titled "The Quirks: Welcome to Normal", which is about a family where everyone has a superpower except the main character, Molly. The series had four titles from 2012 to 2015. In 2014 she started the Puppy Pirates series, which is about a puppy named Wally who joins a group of puppies who are pirates. It had seven titles, plus three "Super Special" books.

== Awards ==
- 2025: Just Keep Walking wins Northeastern MN Book Award
- 2025: What Happened Then and Just Keep Walking: USA Today Bestsellers
- 2023: Controlled Burn wins Northeastern MN Book Award
- 2013: Midwest Connections Pick
- 2015, 2024, 2025: Midwest Independent Booksellers Association Bestseller (The Quirks, Just Keep Walking, What Happened Then, Controlled Burn, The Great Peach Experiment)

== Selected fiction bibliography ==
- Just Like Home series (2026-)
- What Happened Then (2025)
- Just Keep Walking (2024)
- Controlled Burn (2022)
- The Great Peach Experiment series (2021-2024)
- Daring Dreamers Club series (2019-2021)
- The Quirks series (2012–2015)
- Puppy Pirates series (2014–2016)
- Monkey See, Monkey Zoo (2010)
- Kiss It (2010)
- Drive Me Crazy
- Prom Crashers
- Dancing Queen
- Cheating on Myself
- For Soccer-Crazy Girls Only (2014)
- Best Friends (Until Someone Better Comes Along) (2014)
- Juicy Gossip.
