= Lisi Harrison =

Canadian writer

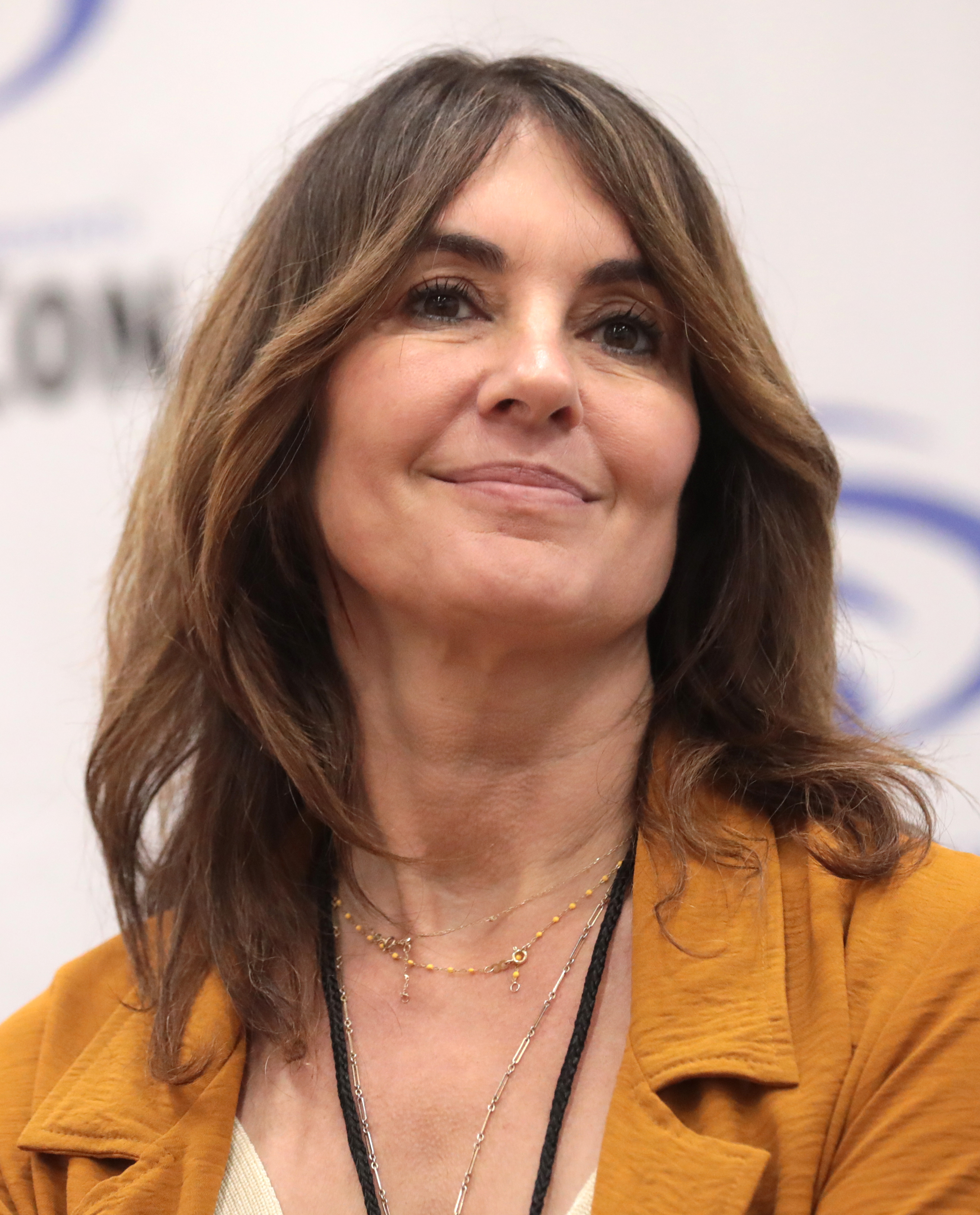
- Harrison at the 2023 WonderCon
- Born: Elyse E. Gottlieb; July 29, 1970 (age 56); Toronto, Ontario, Canada
- Occupation: Novelist
- Children: 2
- Writing career
- Pen name: Lisi Harrison
- Period: 2004-present
- Genre: Fiction
- Website: lisiharrison.com

Elyse E. "Lisi" Harrison (née Gottlieb; born on July 29, 1970) is a Canadian novelist of young adult fiction, known for the three series The Clique, Alphas and Monster High.

== Early life ==
Harrison was born Elyse E. Gottlieb and raised in Toronto, Ontario by her parents Ken and Shaila Gottlieb, along with a brother and a sister. She attended a Hebrew elementary school, then she attended Forest Hill Collegiate Institute public high school. After graduating high school, she went to McGill University as a film major, but transferred after two years to study writing at Emerson College in Boston, Massachusetts. Harrison graduated with a BFA in creative writing.

== Career ==
Harrison worked for 12 years at MTV in New York City. She became the Senior Director of Development for development of shows for the network. Harrison said, "I learned what appeals to teens. I learned how to hold someone's attention. I learned that everyone wants to fit in and be accepted, no matter how old they are," of her experience while working at MTV. Her experience at the network was the inspiration for her bestselling series The Clique, because it reminded her of middle school life. She started writing the first two novels in the series while working at MTV so that she would still have a job if her writing career didn't work out. After selling over 9 million copies in her "Clique" series, Harrison quit her MTV job in June 2004 and focused on her writing career.

She has written seven young adult book series: The Clique, Alphas, Monster High, Pretenders, The Pack, Girl Stuff, and Graveyard Girls. The Clique series has 21 books, including a prequel, a summer collection and a dictionary-style book called the Cliquetionary. The Summer Collection is a collection of five individual books about each character's summer vacation. The Alphas series contains four books, and the Monster High series also contains four books.

Harrison's first adult series, The Dirty Book Club, was released on October 10, 2017.

== Personal life ==
Harrison married Kevin Harrison, a television production executive, in August 2002. They met in 1995 while working on "MTV Beach House" in Malibu, and had two children together. Lisi and Kevin divorced around 2017. She currently resides in Laguna Beach, California.

== Works ==
=== The Clique series ===
- The Clique (later also a movie)
- Best Friends for Never
- Revenge of the Wannabes
- Invasion of the Boy Snatchers
- The Pretty Committee Strikes Back
- Dial L for Loser
- It's Not Easy Being Mean
- Sealed with a Diss
- The Clique Summer Collection: Massie
- The Clique Summer Collection: Dylan
- The Clique Summer Collection: Alicia
- The Clique Summer Collection: Kristen
- The Clique Summer Collection: Claire
- Bratfest at Tiffany's
- P.S. I Loathe You
- Boys R Us
- These Boots Are Made for Stalking
- My Little Phony
- A Tale of Two Pretties
- Charmed and Dangerous: The Rise of the Pretty Committee
- Cliquetionary: The Wit and Wisdom of the Clique

=== Alphas series ===
- Alphas
- Movers & Fakers
- Belle of the Brawl
- Top of the Feud Chain

=== Monster High series ===
- Monster High
- The Ghoul Next Door
- Where There's a Wolf, There's a Way
- Back and Deader Than Ever
- Drop Dead Diary

=== Pretenders series ===
- Pretenders
- License to Spill

=== The Pack series ===
- The Pack
- Claw & Order
- Two Truths and a Lion

=== Girl Stuff series ===
- girl stuff.
- crush stuff.
- awkward stuff.

=== Graveyard Girls series ===
- 1-2-3-4, I Declare a Thumb War
- Scream for the Camera
- Season's Eatings

=== Other ===
- The Dirty Book Club
