= The Clique (series) =

Series of young adult novels by Lisi Harrison

Cover of The Clique, the first novel of the series, released on May 5, 2004

The Clique is a young adult novel series written by Canadian author Lisi Harrison and originally published by Little, Brown and Company, a subsidiary of the Hachette Group. The series was reprinted by Poppy books. The series revolves around five girls: Massie Block, Alicia Rivera, Dylan Marvil, Kristen Gregory, and Claire Lyons, who are known as The Pretty Committee. The Pretty Committee is a popular clique at the fictional, all-girls middle school, Octavian Country Day (OCD). Claire and her family move from Orlando, Florida to Westchester, New York, where they live in the Blocks' guesthouse. Claire is initially considered an outcast due to her financial and fashion status. As the series progresses, Claire slowly develops a friendship with Massie, realizing that she must earn her friendship, and eventually becomes a member of the group.

The first novel, The Clique, was released on May 5, 2004. As of June 2012, 14 novels have been released in the main series. On October 4, 2006, a box set called "The Clique Collection" was released containing the first three novels of the series. A second set was released in November 2006 containing books four through six. From April to August 2008, five novellas named after the five main characters were published in a subseries called "The Clique Summer Collection." The novellas focus on each title characters' activities during the summer between their seventh and eighth grades in school. Harrison composed a guide to the series' "teen speak" terminology and trivia, Cliquetionary, which was released on November 16, 2009. It was announced on Lisi Harrison's website that the fourteenth book (which was released February 15, 2011) would mark the end of the series. However, in October 2024 Harrison and Ellen Marlow, who starred in the 2008 film adaptation, revealed that they are writing a new book for the series, this time focusing on the characters in their 20's.

In 2007, Warner Brothers announced that it had partnered with publisher Alloy Entertainment to create a series of direct-to-DVD films based on the books. A film, based on the first novel The Clique, was released on November 11, 2008. The novels are being adapted into a series of graphic novels by Yen Press, with the first volume released July 2010, with art by Yishan Li. The video game The Clique: Diss and Make-Up is based on the book series. The books have a spin-off series, Alphas.

== History ==
The book-packaging subdivision of Alloy Online, which focuses on the teen market, conceived the series after becoming interested in developing an in-house franchise. They approached Lisi Harrison, who was working as a writer for MTV, about producing a series of youth novels. She said of this proposal, "Always being a closeted wannabe author - I jumped at the opportunity. I loved the idea." Harrison actually wrote this book as a "joke", highlighting that she had named the high school "OCD"–akin to a disease known as obsessive–compulsive disorder, commonly abbreviated as OCD. She created this series to show everyone that popular people aren't perfect and that everyone has flaws. Alloy's involvement in the process of writing varies from series to series; Harrison said that in her case they functioned as a sounding board, but otherwise, "they left me to my own devices. It's very much my book." The result was the first novel in the series, The Clique, which was published in May 2004 by Little, Brown and Company.

== Characters ==
- Massie Block is the arrogant, bossy leader and founder of The Pretty Committee. Her father is a successful businessman, though her family loses their wealth when he loses his job. Massie owns a black pug named Bean. Although she acts stuck-up, she has an insecure side that she usually only reveals to her friends, mostly Claire.
- Alicia Rivera is described as the most beautiful girl at OCD and is infamous for having an especially large chest, which she is deeply insecure about. She loves gossiping, dancing, and Ralph Lauren. She lives in a mansion with her ex-model mother Nadia, and her famous lawyer dad Len. Alicia secretly covets Massie's leader position, which Massie transfers to her after the latter's move to England in A Tale of Two Pretties.
- Dylan Marvil is Massie's "second-in-command" and is the youngest of three daughters of famous television personality Merri-Lee Marvil. Dylan is self-conscious of her weight to the point of obsessively trying to manage it.
- Kristen Gregory is OCD's star athlete who shares the other Pretty Committee members' love of designer fashion despite her tomboyish side. Kristin has a tense relationship with her mother, who disapproves of Kristen's clothing choices. Prior to the beginning of the series, Kristen's father lost all of their money and rendered her family poor, a secret she confides to Claire via instant messaging (believing she is confessing to Massie) before eventually telling the others in "Revenge of the Wannabes". Kristen is also highly intelligent and attends OCD on a full scholarship, until her expulsion in "The Pretty Committee Strikes Back." Kristen eventually becomes the leader of The Witty Committee, a clique formed with the intent to be the opposite of the Pretty Committee and emphasizes intelligence and character rather than wealth and looks. This temporarily ends her friendship with Massie, though she regains Massie's approval later on.
- Claire Lyons is the newest member of the Pretty Committee. Having recently moved to Westchester from Orlando, Florida, her family temporarily lives in the Block family's guest house. Due to Claire's family not being rich or successful like the others, she struggles to fit in with them at first, but eventually earns their approval. She is also friends with an eccentric girl named Layne, whom the Pretty Committee dislikes due to her social awkwardness. Claire is known for her love of Keds shoes and gummy candy.

== List of novels ==
| Title | Date | Length | ISBN |
|---|---|---|---|
| The Clique | May 5, 2004 | 224 pp (first edition) | 978-0-316-70129-7 |
Claire Lyons and her family move from Orlando, Florida to Westchester, New York. While they look for a new home, they are staying in the Block family's guesthouse. Queen bee Massie Block and her clique known as the Pretty Committee--consisting of Alicia, Dylan, and Kristen--are less than delighted to have Claire around. When they reject her attempts at friendship, Claire decides to get revenge by impersonating Massie on instant messenger to learn the girls' secrets and break the group apart. Claire is discovered and is further ostracized until a school field trip in which Kirsten's homemade lip gloss causes an allergic reaction in their classmates. Claire saves the day and is forgiven by the Pretty Committee although Massie still refuses to accept Claire as a member.
| Best Friends for Never | October 4, 2004 | 197 pp (first edition) | 978-0-316-70131-0 |
As Halloween approaches, Massie plans to host the first boy/girl Halloween party of the 7th grade. Kristen and Dylan fight over the affections of Derek Harrington while Massie and Claire flirt with Cam Fisher, unbeknownst to the other. After the Committee wears inappropriate Halloween costumes to school, Principal Burns declares there will be new dress code: uniforms. Massie's parents convince the school to hold a contest/fashion show to select the uniform's design. Claire and Massie decide to put aside their differences and team up to win the uniform contest. Meanwhile, Alicia teams up with Olivia, whom she quickly befriended at the Halloween party. The Pretty Committee receives the best reception but they are surprised when Alicia and Olivia's design wins. They discover evidence that Alicia and Olivia cheated, and Massie vows revenge.
| Revenge of the Wannabes | March 2, 2005 | 296 pp (first edition) | 978-0-316-70133-4 |
After leading her dance class, Alicia, full of confidence, decides to throw her own sleepover and invite a few of her classmates. Massie is furious and kicks Alicia out of the Pretty Committee as punishment. Olivia convinces Alicia to establish her own rival clique and they set about recruiting Pretty Committee lookalikes. Alicia flirts with Cam Fisher's older brother, Harris, while Claire and Cam's burgeoning romance develops. Massie offers Claire membership in the Pretty Committee in exchange for dumping Cam, to which Claire reluctantly agrees. Massie and the Pretty Committee sabotage Alicia and Olivia's photo shoot prize from the uniform contest and reveal evidence of their cheating. When Massie learns Derek Harrington is interested in her, she helps Claire and Cam reconcile. Principal Burns agrees not to install uniforms, Harris dumps Alicia, and Alicia's clique falls apart. Humbled, Alicia apologizes to Massie and is welcomed back into the Pretty Committee.
| Invasion of the Boy Snatchers | October 5, 2005 | 256 pp (first edition) | 978-0-316-70134-1 |
Alicia's cousin Nina from Spain arrives to spend the spring semester at OCD. Massie and Claire grow closer as Claire's father announced an impending move to Chicago. Massie dislikes Nina immediately and feels threatened as Nina quickly becomes the most popular girl at OCD. Massie distrusts Nina and her suspicions are confirmed when Nina flirts with the Pretty Committee's crushes. The Pretty Committee agrees that they must get rid of Nina. Alicia discovers that Nina stole her collection of designer shoes from her sisters and Todd confirms Nina has been stealing other items from students. They reveal Nina as a thief, and she is sent back to Spain, humiliated. Meanwhile, Claire believes Nina's lies that Cam is no longer interested in her so she kisses Josh, Alicia's crush. Cam discovers them and breaks up with her.
| The Pretty Committee Strikes Back | March 1, 2006 | 272 pp (first edition) | 978-0-316-11500-1 |
The girls go on a class trip to Lake Placid. On the campground, the Briarwood boys are just cabins away. Massie quickly sets herself as an authority on how to kiss boys with her MUCK ("Massie's Underground Clinic for Kissing"), but secretly admits to Claire that she doesn't have any experience. Claire coaches Massie to lead the others and Massie kisses Derek Harrington in front of everyone to prove her knowledge of kissing. Meanwhile, Claire desperately tries reconcile with Cam while also keeping Alicia from finding out that she kissed Josh. To her dismay, Alicia reveals that she knows and pretends to kiss Cam to make Claire jealous. Cam admits to Claire that he was trying to make her jealous but wants her to be his first kiss. The Pretty Committee is discovered breaking the field trip's rules and are expelled from OCD.
| Dial L for Loser | August 23, 2006 | 272 pp (first edition) | 978-0-316-11504-9 |
While expelled from school, Dylan invites the Pretty Committee to her mother's talk show, The Daily Grind. After Dylan accidentally blabs gossip about onset drama on the upcoming tween film "Dial L for Loser," the lead actress quits. Nevertheless, the director is impressed with the Pretty Committee and invites them to audition to replace the lead. Massie and Alicia are jealous when Claire wins the part, especially when Claire befriends her co-stars. Massie and Alicia host a segment to follow the filming for The Daily Grind and humiliate Claire. The friends fight, but when Claire discovers her co-stars are shallow and unreliable, she reaches out to the Pretty Committee and they reconcile. The Pretty Committee is re-admitted to OCD.
| It's Not Easy Being Mean | March 7, 2007 | 193 pp (first edition) | 978-0-316-11506-3 |
The Pretty Committee's re-admittance to OCD depends on them joining the school's soccer team. Kristen is embarrassed by the Pretty Committee's lack of athleticism and focus, especially when 8th grade Alpha Skye Hamilton announces that the Pretty Committee must compete against the rest of the 7th grade to find the key to the 8th grade oasis, which will secure them as the next Alphas. Meanwhile, Claire is distracted by the demands of her burgeoning film career and decides to quit acting in order to focus on her friends and Cam. But Massie kicks Claire out of the Pretty Committee for not being sufficiently dedicated to the search for the key. Layne finds the key first but gives it to Claire, who then demands re-admittance to the Pretty Committee in exchange.
| Sealed with a Diss | July 2, 2007 | 272 pp (first edition) | 978-0-316-11506-3 |
After gaining the key to the 8th grade oasis, the Pretty Committee finds out they must get dates to Skye Hamilton's couples costume party and secure Skye's dream date, Chris Abbley, for her or else Skye will take back the key. Luckily, previous Alphas installed a hidden camera in the Briarwood classroom in which the male students talk about their emotions. The Committee tries to use the information to fix their problems, which backfires. Massie befriends Chris to set him up with Skye and is horrified when he flirts with her instead. When the hidden camera breaks, the Pretty Committee breaks into Briarwood to fix it, accidentally damaging a pipe. The Briarwood school floods and the boys are sent to OCD to finish the school year. Massie realizes the boys are now the alphas and declares a "boy fast" until they regain their popularity, much to Alicia's dismay.
| Bratfest at Tiffany's | February 5, 2008 | 227 pp (first edition) | 978-0-316-00680-4 |
After being dumped by their respective crushes at Skye's party, the Pretty Committee is transformed into the New Pretty Committee (NPC) and Massie declares they will no longer fraternize with boys. Alicia works with Josh to kick the NPC out in the overflow trailers so they can stay together. Although the NPC tries to maintain the "boyfast," Massie is drawn to a new crush and Claire attempts to reconcile with Cam. Massie hires an image consultant to give themselves and the trailers a makeover, which restores their social standing. Massie then declares the "boy fast" over.
| P.S. I Loathe You | February 10, 2009 | 224 pp (first edition) | 978-0-316-00681-1 |
When Layne and Massie both have a crush on Dempsey Solomon, Kristen must decide which friend to help. But when Dempsey starts flirting with her, Kristen decides to go after him for herself. Massie starts a cheerleading squad to have an excuse to be close to Dempsey, but Alicia doesn't like how Massie rules the squad and creates her own rival group. Dylan develops a crush on Massie's ex-boyfriend. Derrick, and is determined to get him behind Massie's back. Betrayed by her friends, Massie disbands the Pretty Committee and Claire remains her only friend.
| Boys R Us | July 7, 2009 | 272 pp (first edition) | 978-0-316-00682-8 |
Alicia forms Briarwood Octavian Country Dayschool's (BOCD) first boy-girl clique, The Soul M8S. Meanwhile, Massie hires a group of four actress-models and creates her own enviable clique to steal the spotlight from Alicia and establish her dominance. Claire is forced to choose between Massie and The Soul M8S, as Alicia and Massie plan different parties with the most coveted invitations in town. Eventually, Alicia realizes the boys will not be commanded easily and Massie discovers hired friends are not as great as genuine ones. The two make up and reform the Pretty Committee.
| Charmed and Dangerous: The Rise of the Pretty Committee | October 27, 2009 | 192 pp (first edition) | 978-0-316-05537-6 |
In the prequel to the series, Massie is stuck as a beta in a group, Alicia obsesses over her group's new dance routine, Dylan realizes she isn't as skinny as she thought, and Kristen babysits for money in hopes of climbing the social ladders. The four girls meet for the first time and decide to form their own clique. In Florida, Claire almost gets a kiss from her favorite boy band and dreams of one day achieving immense popularity.
| These Boots Are Made for Stalking | March 9, 2010 | 272 pp (first edition) | 978-0-316-00683-5 |
Dylan, Alicia, and Kristen decide that like Massie, they want 9th grade crushes like her new crush, Landon Crane. They try to get Claire join them, but she is fully satisfied with Cam. However, Claire worries the Pretty Committee is outgrowing her. When Massie sees Landon with a mysterious girl with a bird tattoo, she becomes jealous. Meanwhile, the Pretty Committee organizes a charity fashion show for the holidays.
| My Little Phony | July 3, 2010 | 978-0-316-08444-4 | |
For various reasons, the Pretty Committee have been banned from shopping by their respective parents. After Massie pranks Todd and Claire's other friends, she and Claire get into a fight and Claire decides to prank Massie back. Meanwhile, Massie worries about kissing Landon and her inexperience so she decides to go to his house and kiss him to get over her fear. Massie is embarrassed when she discovers she kissed Landon in front of his grandparents. Back home, Massie's parents reveal her father lost her job and they are now broke.
| A Tale of Two Pretties | February 15, 2011 | 978-0-316-08442-0 | |
At Claire's urging, Massie admits to the Pretty Committee about being broke and they promise to stand by her, but changes are swirling around them. Dylan's family begins filming a reality show, Kristen joins an elite soccer team that takes up her time, and Alicia visits a psychic who predicts Alicia will become an alpha. Massie's father announces that he found a new job, but the family has to move to England. Massie is given the option to stay in Westchester with her friends. Massie visits Alicia's psychic, who predicts England is her destiny. Massie announces her move, and appoints Alicia as the new alpha. Claire and her family finally leave the Block's guest house into their own home in Layne's neighborhood. As the girls embark for high school, they vow to remain friends.

=== The Summer Books ===
| Title | Date | Length | ISBN |
|---|---|---|---|
| Massie | April 1, 2008 | 144 pp (first edition) | 978-0-316-02751-9 |
Massie is kicked out of the Galwaugh riding camp and her parents aren't happy. They decide that Massie should get a summer job to pay for the tuition. Massie eventually decides she wants to work as a salesgirl for the cosmetic company Be Pretty to earn her money and the legendary purple streak, which grants priority status to any girl. She accomplishes this by telling her clients the brutal truth about how they look, and breaks the sales record using this tactic. When the owner of the company learns about this, she forces Massie to apologize, but she instead says she is "retiring," and steals the owner's hair streak device to give herself one.
| Dylan | May 6, 2008 | 144 pp (first edition) | 978-0-316-03565-1 |
Dylan and her TV-host mom go to Hawaii for the aloha tennis open so Merri-Lee can interview the teen tennis sensation, "tennis the menace" Svetlana Slootskyia, who happens to have an uncontrollable temper. Dylan gets off on the wrong foot with Svetlana immediately. But Dylan needs Svetlana's help to learn the game of tennis in order to impress her summer crush, J.T. When the sadistic Svetlana humiliates her in front of J.T., who turns out to harbor a crush on the tennis phenom, Dylan gets revenge by making her lose her temper at a championship match, which humiliates Svetlana to go back into therapy. In the end, she spends the summer with male tennis champ Brady.
| Alicia | June 3, 2008 | 144 pp (first edition) | 978-0-316-02753-3 |
Alicia heads off to Spain for the summer, and is allowed to travel without her parents for the first time. While there, she works to get herself featured in a music video including a certain famous superstar.
| Kristen | July 1, 2008 | 144 pp (first edition) | 978-0-316-02752-6 |
Kristen is spending her summer at home in Westchester, tutoring a bratty 9-year-old girl named Ripple, who has aspirations of being like Massie. Ripple's brother Dune is a hot surfer, but he's got a crush on Skye Hamilton, the Alpha of the 8th grade. Kristen and the Witty Committee, why includes Claire's friend, LBR Layne Abeley, play a prank on Skye to transfer Dune's affections to Kristen. Also Kristen creates a friendship with someone unexpected.
| Claire | August 5, 2008 | 144 pp (first edition) | 978-0-316-02750-2 |
Claire goes to Florida to visit her old BFFs, Amanda, Sarah, and Sari. While there, Massie visits unexpectedly, and the girls end up competing in the "Miss Kiss" beauty contest. Claire's friends (including Massie) pressure her to vote for them for the title of "Miss Kiss". When Claire gets ask to be a celebrity host, Claire then will have to choose between her Florida BFFs and The Pretty Committee. Claire ultimately chooses Massie once realizing that she is a true friend to her.

=== Other Clique Books ===
| Title | Date | Length | ISBN |
|---|---|---|---|
| Cliquetionary | November 16, 2009 | 80 pp (first edition) | 978-0-316-07065-2 |
The Cliquetionary defines vocabulary from the Clique series (such as "ah-mazing," "ehmagawd," etc.) & provides some insights from the Pretty Committee. Terms are taken from the book series.

== Reception ==
The Clique was selected as a "Quick Pick For Reluctant Young Adult Readers" by YALSA. Best Friends for Never was nominated for the 2005 Quill Awards in the "Young Adult/Teen" category. Best Friends for Never reached The New York Times bestseller list in early February 2005, four months after it was published, but remained there only one week. It returned in late February for another week, reaching #7. Following the release of the next volume in the series, It entered the bestseller list again in late March, where it stayed another week, then in late April, where it remained for three weeks. In late March it also made an appearance on the Publishers Weekly bestseller list, coming in at #9. Copies of the novel have continued to sell in large numbers: nearly 150,000 in 2005, over 200,000 in 2006, and over 150,000 in 2007.

Three of the novels from the "Summer Collection", Alicia, Dylan, and Massie, made the New York Times' Children's Books best seller list. On June 22, 2008, Alicia debuted on the list in first place, with Dylan and Massie placing second and sixth, respectively.

=== Critical reviews ===
In reviewing the first novel, The Clique, reviewers remarked on the behavior of the characters, with Publishers Weekly noting that it "takes cliquish, snobbish behavior to Hollywood extremes" and School Library Journal saying that "the cruelty of the clique [is not] redeemed with any sort of a satisfying ending." There were also comments about the novel's use of brand names: School Library Journal said that it "has trendy references kids will love"; Booklist expounded more on the subject, saying that the novel goes into "too much detail about how the super wealthy live" but added that it "has fun with the tyranny of brand names" - although they also cautioned that "the very specifics that teens will recognize will be 'so out' before the year is over." Additionally, Booklist described the instant messaging segments as "hilarious", while School Library Journal criticized "the shallowness of the characters" and "the one-dimensional plot". Spero News says "At first, it's easy to hate this book and the shallow materialism that these characters embody. On the other hand, they're so impossible to take seriously that you have to laugh at them. These girls are so 13-going-on-30."

Reviewers' general descriptions of Best Friends for Never focused on its lightweight nature and entertainment value: Book Loons called it "good soap operatic fun", The Virginian Pilot said it was "a fairly quick and easy read", Teen Reads found it to be "another quick, fun, enjoyable read", while Romantic Times thought that it was "sinful, nasty fun" and gave it three stars. More negative comments that were made included The Virginian Pilot's assertion that it "lacks the sophistication and style of deeper novels". On the behavior of the characters—something the first volume was criticized for—Romantic Times said, "Good news for fans—the girls are just as catty now as they were before." Book Loons added that it "does capture both the occasionally unpleasant verbal interactions and emotional vulnerability of pre-teen girls." The book's cliffhanger ending was described as "perfect" by Teen Reads and according to The Virginian Pilot is, along with the "mild twists", what made the novel an "interesting read."
