= Sidekicks (The Naked Brothers Band) =

- The Naked Brothers Band episodes
- Episode nos.: Season 2 Episodes 1-2
- Directed by: Polly Draper
- Written by: Polly Draper
- Cinematography by: Ken H. Keller
- Editing by: Craig Cobb
- Production code: 201-202/ 997
- Original air date: January 21, 2008

Guest appearance
- Sarah Livingston as Patrice

Episode chronology
← Previous "Been There, Rocked That"	Next → "Great Trip"

"Sidekicks" is the first and second episodes of the second season of the television series The Naked Brothers Band, which aired as a television movie special on Nickelodeon on January 21, 2008 to 3.6 million viewers; it was the highest rated program for the week for children in the 6-11 and 9-14 age groups.

The TV movie episode is in the format of a rock-mockumentary. Sidekicks is written and directed by Polly Draper, who also serves as showrunner and is the mother to the show's stars, Nat Wolff and Alex Wolff, the lead singer-songwriter and drummer, respectively.

== Plot ==
In the beginning of the film, Nat and Alex are talking about how school ended three months ago. They don't want to explain it, so they ask the audience if they want to go three months in the past in their "Time Machine". They try to go back in time making strange noises, but they're still in the present because the audience didn't believe, so they try again, and are taken three months into the past.

It is the final few days of school at Amigos Elementary, and the Naked Brothers Band start their tour at the year-end Masquerade Party. The theme of the party is "Superheroes", and Nat and Alex don't know who to be. Alex finds the Batman costume, which means that Nat is a sidekick.

Nat and Alex change their minds many times, and don't care what hero they are, as long as they're more powerful than one another, but Nat just wants to be more powerful than Rosalina. Then, Jesse remembers that Rosalina's prom is the same night as the Masquerade, so she won't be going to the Masquerade.

At Amigos Middle (Nat's school) and Amigos High School (Rosalina's school), Nat and Rosalina begin conversing about the Masquerade Party, which coincidentally is on the same night as Rosalina's prom. Rosalina says that she doesn't want to go to the prom because it isn't her dream.

The head of the prom committee, Patrice Johnston (Sarah Livingston), bumps into Nat and Rosalina's conversation and tells them to act cool, because the most popular boy in high school, senior Wade Kilgannon (Mark Richard Keith), is walking over to the high school doors.

Wade asks Rosalina out to the prom and Nat tells her to go (even though he didn't really want his crush to go out with another guy) and Wade makes plans without letting Rosalina have a final say in the matter, saying that: "It is every girl's dream". Patrice gets very upset, because she thought that Wade was coming over to ask her to the prom.

Meanwhile, Thomas and David are thinking of pranks to pull on Principal Schmoke (Tim Draper), and Qaasim is running away from four girls that he asked to the Masquerade Party, who all said yes, and have no idea about the others.

While practicing for the tour, Alex makes up his own superhero "BASSFF Man" (Bat And Super Spider Fantastic Four Man), and he makes Nat his sidekick, "Birdie". Jesse comes in for practice with her sisters, Bessy and Tessy, as well as three other sisters (who are really The Adorable Timmerman Brothers), for the new director, Wing's, vision about the tour having dancing girls.

Rosalina comes in late for practice (visibly upset) because she went shopping for her dress. Nat is also upset that she is missing practice constantly, whether it is for setting up for the prom or getting things for her big night.

The next day, when Rosalina was nowhere to be found, Nat thought that this was enough. He goes to Rosalina's school, and she is decorating for the prom, because she has to put in hours or she can't go. Patrice storms in and tells Nat and Rosalina that she is going to kill them, because they cut her scene out of the "Long Distance" music video. In order to get revenge, and to make Rosalina mad, she forces Nat to go to the prom with her.

On the night of the Masquerade party and prom, Alex is trying to get Nat ready. Nat is wearing a baby blue tuxedo, and Alex is splashing him with cologne. Nat goes to pick up Patrice, and she ignores Nat and is all dolled up for the cameras so she can get her camera time.

When Wade picks up Rosalina, she asks him to come inside to take pictures, but instead, Wade pulls out his cell phone and takes a picture there. At the prom, Nat and Rosalina bump into each other and are very lonely because their dates abandoned them near the punch bowl. A slow song comes on, and Nat and Rosalina dance together.

Meanwhile, Qaasim is running away from the four girls he asked out to the party, and (strangely) they are all dressed the same, so he can't tell them apart. David and Thomas are in the boys bathroom at the elementary school. They erased the legendary graffiti in the bathroom that said: "Put in Joe Schmoke and watch the other team croak!"

When Principal Schmoke find out, he stops the party and searches everyone's bags for cleaning liquids. Cooper kept it in his briefcase, because he tries to take the blame for it. Qaasim tells David and Thomas to confess, because he wants to continue the party as soon as possible. Qaasim starts shouting "confess!" and the students join in.

Then, Principal Schmoke finds Cooper's briefcase filled with cleaning supplies and Principal Schmoke tells Cooper how disappointed he is in him. Then, Alex (Alex Wolff) shouts out that he did it, since he doesn't have a reputation to break.

David and Thomas feel guilty and wonder why everybody is taking the blame for them. Then, David and Thomas finally confess. Then, Principal Schmoke grabs them by the top of their costumes and takes them to the bathroom. They kept spelling Schmoke — Shmoke. So Principal Schmoke takes over spelling his name the correct way. The two later sneak out of the bathroom.

At the prom, Nat and Rosalina watch Patrice's world premiere edit rendition of The Naked Brothers Band's "Long Distance" music video starring herself. It is basically frames of her sighing and looking out of a window in black and white.

Nat and Rosalina leave the prom and change into their sidekick costumes while no one is looking to perform their song, "I Don't Want To Go to School". A high schooler finds out the NBB is performing at the middle school party and tells everyone, so they all leave to watch the performance. Everyone—except Patrice—is happy.

== Cast ==
Cast	Role
Nat Wolff	self: age 12, Lead singer-songwriter/keyboardist/the ladies man
Alex Wolff	self: age 9, Drummer, and Jesse's "little boyfriend"
David Julian Levi	self: age 12, Keyboardist
Thomas Batuello	self: age 12, Cellist
Qaasim Middleton	self: age 12, Guitarist
Allie DiMeco	Rosalina: age 14, Bassist; Nat's crush; inspiration for most of his songs
Cooper Pillot	self: age 12, Band manager
Michael Wolff	Sonny Wolff: Accordion player
Jesse Draper	Jesse Cook: Band tutor, babysitter
Catherine Curtin	Betty: Dad's girl friend
Emily Richardson	Patty: Cooper's friend
Teala Dunn	Juanita: Alex's crush and skateboarding friend
Eleanor Draper	Tessy: Jesse's sister
Lisa Mulligan	Bessy: Jesse's sister
Billy Draper	Billy Timmerman: The Adorable Timmerman Brothers Band
Adam Draper	Donnie Timmerman: The Adorable Timmerman Brothers Band
Coulter Mulligan	Johnny Timmerman: The Adorable Timmerman Brothers Band
Daniel Raymont	Wing: Crazy Tour director
Tim Draper	Principal Schmoke: Principal of Amigos Elementary, Middle, and High School
Sarah Livingston	Patrice: Rosalina's High school rival and Nat's prom date
Mark Richard Keith	Wade: Rosalina's prom date
