= The Naked Brothers Band =

The Naked Brothers Band may refer to:

- The Naked Brothers Band: The Movie, a 2005 film
  - The Naked Brothers Band: Music from the Movie, the soundtrack
- The Naked Brothers Band (TV series), 2007-09, a spin-off of the film
  - The Naked Brothers Band (album), 2007 soundtrack
- The Naked Brothers Band (video game), 2008

== See also ==
- Nat and Alex Wolff, music group who wrote and performed the TV series music
