= Stella's Last Weekend =

- Theatrical release poster
- Directed by: Polly Draper
- Written by: Polly Draper
- Produced by: Polly Draper; Ken H. Keller; Caron Rudner
- Starring: Nat Wolff; Alex Wolff; Paulina Singer; Nick Sandow; Polly Draper
- Cinematography: David Kimelman
- Edited by: Frank Reynolds
- Music by: Michael Wolff (score/theme music composer)
- Production company: Related Pictures
- Distributed by: Paladin
- Release date: October 12, 2018
- Running time: 102 minutes
- Country: United States
- Language: English

Stella's Last Weekend is a 2018 American comedy film written and directed by Polly Draper and starring her sons, Nat Wolff and Alex Wolff.

== Plot ==
College freshman Jack returns to his home in the New York suburbs, in the wake of news of his life-long dog Stella's imminent death. En route, he recognizes a girl on the subway he met at a party, whom he had been infatuated with.

Jack reunites happily with his younger brother Oliver and mother Sally. He meets her boyfriend Ron, who disapproves of the boys’ raunchy and cavalier rhetoric towards their mother despite their devotion to her.

Oliver later introduces his girlfriend Violet, a ballet dancer, who turns out to be the girl from the train. When privately confronted by Jack, she maintains angrily that she had good reason to ignore his calls. She and the boys leave for a party held by a fellow dancer, Cassandra.

Upon confrontation, Cassandra is revealed to have untruthfully told Violet that she slept with Jack. They leave and spend the night at the arcade, during which Jack wins a toy octopus for Violet, and they kiss while Oliver is preoccupied. Feeling torn, he returns home and finds his mother, and they smoke cannabis in an attempt to medicate the dog. He admits that he kissed Violet and his mother tells him not to tell Oliver. Violet and Oliver both have sex for the first time.

Oliver later notices a picture from Violet sent to Jack of the octopus he won at the arcade, and Jack admits he's failing most of his college classes. The family gets ready for a party celebrating Stella's life where she is set to be euthanized. Ron reveals his desire to get closer to the boys' mother.

Sally talks to Violet and tells her to not come between the boys, leading her to break up with Oliver. He asks Jack to help win her back at her performance the next day. Instead, the three have a run-in with Cassandra, who reveals Violet's past with Jack and that a security guard at the arcade related to one of the dancers observed their kiss.

Later, at Stella's party, Oliver gives a speech about Stella that devolves into a tirade about Jack, during which he reveals Jack is failing. While they fight, Stella dies of natural causes. They bury her on the beach.

Returning home, they find Violet waiting on the porch. She and Jack agree they can't be together, while Oliver hides in the car. Violet talks to him and apologizes, assuring him she cares for him and that she does not view him as inferior to his brother.

Ron talks to Jack and they reflect on Sally not moving on since her husband's death and on Jack's interest in marine biology like his father. The boys are gifted puppies from one of the attendants of the party. They reconcile while watching an old family movie including Stella and their father at the beach.

== Cast ==
- Nat Wolff as Jack.
- Alex Wolff as Oliver, Jack's younger brother.
- Polly Draper as Sally, who is Jack and Oliver's mother.
- Paulina Singer as Violet, Oliver's girlfriend.
- Nick Sandow as Ron, Sally's boyfriend.

== Production ==
Draper wrote and directed the film, and she also produced it alongside Ken H. Keller and Caron Rudner-Keller, under their Related Pictures tag. Principal photography took place at Related Pictures in Brooklyn, New York. Rosemary Lombard was co-producer, and the executive producers were Fred Roos, Jennifer Au, Draper's brother Tim, father William, Stephanie Simon, Evan Hainey, Naisha Arnold, and Nick Styne. Her jazz musician husband Michael Wolff composed the score and theme music. Their sons Nat Wolff and Alex Wolff also wrote and performed songs featured in the film.

== Reception ==
On review aggregator Rotten Tomatoes, the film holds an approval rating of 65% based on 20 reviews, with an average rating of 5.7/10. On Metacritic, the film has a weighted average score of 60 out of 100, based on six critics, indicating "mixed or average reviews". Nell Minow of RogerEbert.com awarded the film three stars. Tom Keogh of The Seattle Times awarded it one and a half stars out of four. Jeffrey M. Anderson of Common Sense Media gave the film three stars out of five.
