= The Naked Brothers Band: Music from the Movie =

Soundtrack album by The Naked Brothers Band
- Released: April 3, 2007
- Recorded: 2004
- Genre: Bubblegum pop
- Length: 14:50
- Label: Nick/Columbia
- Producer: Michael Wolff and Michael A. Levine

The Naked Brothers Band chronology
The Naked Brothers Band: Music from the Movie (2007)	The Naked Brothers Band (2007)

The Naked Brothers Band: Music from the Movie is an EP/soundtrack by The Naked Brothers Band for The Naked Brothers Band: The Movie. It was released as an extra disc on the Naked Brothers Band Movie DVD. The disc was only available with the DVD for a short time only and now is only available to buy on Amazon. It was not an official release and has not yet been released separately, or on The iTunes Store. The first single "Crazy Car" charted on the Billboard Hot 100 in 2007 at No. 83.

== Background ==
=== Development ===
Nat begged his dad to record music in the recording studio at the early age of 6. His father, Michael Wolff allowed him to, so Nat recorded the song "Crazy Car". Polly Draper (Nat & Alex's mom), then wrote a film about her son's band The Naked Brothers Band. Along with the film she wanted her sons to record songs, as if it they were recording a soundtrack for the film.

=== Writing ===
Nat Wolff began writing music for the film in early 2004, having already written and recorded "Crazy Car" he had to write very few songs. He wrote "Got No Mojo", "Motormouth", "Hardcore Wrestlers" and "If There Was a Place to Hide".

=== Recording ===
Recording began in early 2004, when Nat was just 9 years old. He recorded all of the music he wrote for him, his brother Alex was also able to write a song for the film, "That's How It Is". The music was recorded by June 2004, just before filming began on The Naked Brothers Band Movie.

=== Release ===
The songs were meant to be released on a soundtrack for the movie, called: The Naked Brothers Band: Music from the Movie in 2006, but due to the project being developed into a television series instead, the soundtrack was unreleased.

The music was instead released on an extra disc that came with the DVD of the movie, that was released on April 3, 2007. The album only included 5 songs from the film, and was only available for a short time.

== Track listing ==
The Naked Brothers Band: Music from the Movie includes the following tracks.

No.	Title	Length
1.	"Crazy Car"	2:41
2.	"Motormouth"	2:17
3.	"That's How It Is"	3:43
4.	"Hardcore Wrestlers (With Inner Feelings)"	3:22
5.	"Rosalina"	2:47

== Charting ==
Due to the album being released as an extra disc to the film's DVD, it was not eligible to chart. However, the first single from the album "Crazy Car" charted in 2007, peaking at No. 83 on the Billboard Hot 100.

== Limited release ==
Due to it being an extra disc on The Naked Brothers Band: The Movie DVD, it was only available for a limited time only. As of 2010, the extra disc is no longer available in the United States.
