= Tommy Nelson (actor) =

American actor (born 1997)

- Nelson in 2017
- Born: Thomas Daniel Nelson; December 7, 1997 (age 28); West Haven, Connecticut, U.S.
- Occupation: Actor
- Years active: 2006–present
- Spouse: Alexanna Brier (m. 2023)

Thomas Daniel Nelson (born December 7, 1997) is an American actor. He is best known for his performances as Neil in the biopic My Friend Dahmer and Russell in The Cat and the Moon.

== Career ==
Nelson's film debut came in 2006 playing Edward Jr. Age 6–7 in Robert De Niro's, The Good Shepherd. In 2012, he played Nickleby, a Khaki Scout, in the coming-of-age film Moonrise Kingdom. Since then, he has transitioned into maturer roles beginning with his portrayal of Neil in My Friend Dahmer. He starred as Russell in the drama film The Cat and the Moon, alongside his Dahmer costar Alex Wolff.

Outside of film, he has made guest appearances on television shows such as Gotham, Better Call Saul, and FBI.

During May to August 2019 he appeared alongside Taylor Hanks in the one-act play Fucknut (happy new year) written by Ryan Sans at Dixon Place and 13th Street Repertory Theatre.

== Personal life ==
Nelson was born in West Haven, Connecticut, and attended West Haven High School. He played guitar in jazz band and was actively involved in theatre including productions of The Drowsy Chaperone and The Laramie Project. In 2015 he was the recipient of the Connecticut Association of Schools Fine Arts Award for the Music/Theatre Division.

A Philadelphia Eagles fan, he played football during his senior year. Growing up, his favorite player was Brian Dawkins.

From September 2015 to December 2017, he attended the Film, Television, Voice-overs, & Commercial Acting (FTVC) Pace University School of Performing Arts program. He left in January 2018 to focus on acting.

Despite having naturally brown hair, Nelson admitted in an interview with BUILD Series that he kept his hair blonde and adopted the wardrobe of his character from The Cat and the Moon (joggers, sweatshirt, and a gold chain) for six months after filming ended. This can be seen in his appearance on Better Call Saul.

Nelson began dating Alexanna Brier, his Sour Honey co-star, in 2023. They married on September 11 of that year. They divorced within a year of the marriage.

== Filmography ==
=== Film ===
Year	Title	Role	Notes
2006	The Good Shepherd	Edward Wilson Jr. - Age 6-7	
2007	The Ten	Noah Jennings	
2007	And Then Came Love	Horatio	
2007	Then She Found Me	Jimmy Ray	
2008	Quid Pro Quo	Young Isaac Knott	
2009	Offspring	Luke Carey	
2010	Meek's Cutoff	Jimmy White	
2011	The Woman	Walter	Uncredited
2012	Moonrise Kingdom	Nickleby	
2013	Mastodon	Dan	Short
2014	Night Has Settled	Nick	
2015	Solo	Clay	Short
2016	Barry	Buzz	
2017	My Friend Dahmer	Neil Davis	
2019	The Cat and the Moon	Russell	
2024	Sour Honey	Rocky	Short

=== Television ===
Year	Title	Role	Notes
2006	Rescue Me	Kid on Bus	Episode: "Sparks"
2007	Dirty Sexy Money	Young Brian Darling Sr.	Episode: "Pilot"
2007	Law & Order: Criminal Intent	Clay Darren Jr.	Episode: "Courtship"
2008	The Prince of Motor City	Malcolm	Television Film
2009	Possible Side Effects	Ben Collins	Television Film
2011	Mildred Pierce	Newsboy	Television Mini-Series "Part 1" & "Part 2"
2014	Boardwalk Empire	Ned	Episode: "Cuanto"
2014	Law & Order: Special Victims Unit	Gregory Miller	Episode: "Producer's Backend"
2017	The Path	Brian	Episode: "Why We Source"
2017	Gotham	Brant Jones	Episode: "A Dark Knight: A Day in the Narrows"
2018	Blindspot	Cameron	Episode: "Warning Shot"
2018	Better Call Saul	Rocco	Episodes: "Quite a Ride" & "Piñata"
2019	FBI	Ivan Childress	Episode: "An Imperfect Science"
2022	The Righteous Gemstones	Young Junior Marsh	Episode: "I Speak in the Tongues of Men and Angels"
2024	Law & Order: Special Victims Unit	Travis Butler	Episode: "Truth Embargo"
