= NBB =

NBB can mean:

- The Naked Brothers Band (disambiguation), various subjects
- National Bank of Bahrain
- National Bank of Belgium, the central bank of Belgium since 1850
- National Biodiesel Board, a biodiesel interest organization headquartered in Jefferson City, Missouri
- New Basket Brindisi, a professional men's basketball club in Brindisi, Italy
- Nomura Babcock & Brown, Japanese investment firm
- Normal buffer base, a blood value
- The Notorious Boo-Boys, supporters of Bohemian F.C.
- Novo Basquete Brasil, the top-level Brazilian men's basketball league
- Newburgh–Beacon Bridge
- New Bullards Bar Dam and New Bullards Bar Reservoir in Northern California
