= Black Sheep (Nat & Alex Wolff album) =

Studio album by Nat & Alex Wolff
- Released: October 11, 2011 (United States)
- Recorded: July – August 2009 (New York); March – April 2010 (Los Angeles)
- Genre: Pop rock
- Length: 43:40
- Label: Saddleup Records
- Producers: Matt Wallace, Michael Wolff, Daniel Wise

Nat & Alex Wolff chronology
I Don't Want to Go to School (2008)	Black Sheep (2011)	Throwbacks (2013)

Singles from Black Sheep
- 1. "Maybe" Released: May 20, 2011; 2. "Thump Thump Thump" Released: August 30, 2011

Black Sheep is the debut studio album by American sibling duo Nat & Alex Wolff, released on October 11, 2011, by Saddleup Records. The duo was required to change its name because the Naked Brothers Band is a trademark of Paramount Global, the successor of Viacom, which owns the Nickelodeon television channel, on which the television show of the same name aired.

== Background ==
The album was recorded in New York in mid-2009 and in Los Angeles over a six-week period from March to April 2010. The song "Losing You to the Crowd" was written by Alex while he and his family were on vacation in Australia for the 2009 Kid's Choice Awards in Melbourne.

Various demos and covers were recorded to promote not only the brothers, but also their official website. Those songs include The Beatles' song "A Hard Day's Night" and Bruce Springsteen's "Dancing in the Dark."

== Promotion and release ==
The brothers filmed their own web series from September to December 2010, and in February 2011. These webisodes were released online weekly on their YouTube page and featured snippets of tracks from their upcoming album.

The album's first single, "Maybe," was released on May 20, 2011 and made available as a free download.

The song "Thump Thump Thump" was written by younger brother Alex Wolff.

== Inspiration ==
The brothers have said they were inspired by bands such as Nirvana, Weezer and The Beatles. The music on Black Sheep is more alternative in nature than their previous works, and Nat has said the album is more sophisticated and that he feels he has developed as a songwriter. The boys did not want the same style of music they were known for during their run as The Naked Brothers Band.

== Track listing ==
All tracks are written by Nat Wolff, except where noted by Alex Wolff

Standard Edition
No.	Title	Length
1.	"Illuminated"	3:52
2.	"Thump Thump Thump" (Alex Wolff)	4:32
3.	"Maybe"	3:31
4.	"Disappointed" (Alex Wolff)	3:16
5.	"18"	3:31
6.	"Greatest Prize"	4:13
7.	"Lullaby" (Alex Wolff)	4:38
8.	"Colorful Raindrops" (Alex Wolff)	4:38
9.	"Monday Afternoon"	3:51
10.	"Losing You To The Crowd" (Alex Wolff)	4:29
11.	"I Won't Love You Any Less"	3:09
Total length:		43:40

iTunes Deluxe Edition
No.	Title	Length
12.	"Sitting in my Sorrow" (Alex Wolff)	3:53
13.	"The Party"	2:50
14.	"Help Me Understand"	4:29
15.	"Hey Bartholomew"	1:56
16.	"Thump Thump Thump" (Video)	4:29

== Personnel ==
- Nat Wolff – vocals, guitars, piano, bass guitar, keyboards
- Alex Wolff – vocals, guitars, drums, piano, percussion
