= The Naked Brothers Band (album) =

Soundtrack album / Studio album by The Naked Brothers Band
- Released: October 9, 2007
- Recorded: Summer 2004, Summer 2006, May 2007
- Genre: Pop rock, teen pop
- Length: 42:00
- Label: Nick/Columbia
- Producer: Michael Wolff and Michael A. Levine

The Naked Brothers Band chronology
Music from the Movie (2007)	The Naked Brothers Band (2007)	I Don't Want to Go to School (2008)

Singles from The Naked Brothers Band
- 1. "Crazy Car" Released: April 3, 2007; 2. "If That's Not Love" Released: September 10, 2007

The Naked Brothers Band is a soundtrack album by Nat and Alex Wolff for season 1 of The Naked Brothers Band television series. The album was also released as a deluxe fanpack that includes a poster, lyrics and 2 bonus tracks.

== Background ==
=== Development ===
A former Nickelodeon executive saw The Naked Brothers Band: The Movie at the Hamptons International Film Festival, in late 2005. They picked the show up in 2006. Polly Draper asked her boys to record all the music for the series as an album. Nat and Alex's jazz pianist father Michael Wolff wrote the underscore and produced the music with Michael A. Levine.

=== Writing ===
After being asked to record an album, the brothers began writing several songs for the show. The songs had a pop style, directed more for younger viewers. Alex was only able to write two songs for the series, due to being 8 at the time.

=== Release ===
The album released on October 7, 2007, and debuted at #23 on the Billboard 200 for 3 weeks.

== Track listings ==
All tracks are written by Nat Wolff, except "I Could Be" and "Alien Clones" by Alex Wolff.

Season 1 Soundtrack
No.	Title	Length
1.	"If That's Not Love" (Theme Song)	2:14
2.	"Taxi Cab" (from "Puberty")	1:59
3.	"Banana Smoothie" (from "VMA's" and "A Man Needs A Maid")	2:33
4.	"Crazy Car" (from "The Movie")	2:44
5.	"Fishing For Love" (from "Fishin' for Love")	2:32
6.	"I Indeed Can See" (from "Nat Is A Stand Up Guy")	3:17
7.	"I'm Out" (from "VMA's")	2:23
8.	"Sometimes I'll Be There" (from "The Wolff Brothers Cry Wolf")	3:15
9.	"L.A." (from "Battle of the Bands, Parts 1 and 2")	2:42
10.	"I Could Be" (from "A Rebel & A Skateboarder")	2:17
11.	"Beautiful Eyes" (from "Alex's Clothing Line")	2:40
12.	"Run" (from "Alien Clones")	3:01
13.	"Nowhere (I Miss My Family)" (from "The Song")	3:24
14.	"Alien Clones" (from "Alien Clones")	2:44
15.	"Long Distance" (from "First Kiss (on the Lips that Is)")	4:01
16.	"Catch Up With The End" (from "Nat Is A Stand Up Guy")	3:55
17.	"Girl Of My Dreams" (from "Battle of the Bands, Part 2")	3:26
Total length:		42:00

== Personnel ==
- Bob Glaub - bass
- Jennifer Condos - bass
- Erik Friedlander - cello
- Alex Wolff - drums, vocals
- John Guth - guitar
- Craig Stull - guitar
- Peter Maunu - guitar
- Nat Wolff - guitar, piano, vocals
- Matt Laug - percussion, drums
- Michael Wolff - accordion, keyboards

== International release ==
The album was released internationally, unlike their following album I Don't Want to Go to School. The album was released in England, Australia, Canada, Brazil and New Zealand.

== Follow-up ==
Due to the Success of the first season of the show, it was commissioned for a second season. Season 2 aired in 2008 and an album was released which featured the music, I Don't Want to Go to School. The album was released in the United States alone on April 15, 2008.

== Critical reception ==
Professional ratings
Review scores
Source	Rating
AllMusic	3.5/5 stars

The album received generally mixed reviews, AllMusic gave the album a 3 1/2 star rating while other sites said the album was aimed at younger children, due to its bubblegum pop style and catchy lyrics. Sony Music gave the album a favourable 4 star rating, calling it great for kids, but not aimed at adults.
