= I Don't Want to Go to School =

- Deluxe Version/Fan Pack Cover

Soundtrack album / studio album by The Naked Brothers Band
- Released: April 15, 2008
- Recorded: Summer 2007
- Genre: Pop rock, blues rock
- Length: 45:55
- Label: Nick/Columbia
- Producer: Michael Wolff and Michael A. Levine

The Naked Brothers Band chronology
The Naked Brothers Band (2007)	I Don't Want to Go to School (2008)	Black Sheep (2011)

Singles from I Don't Want to Go to School
- 1. "I Don't Want to Go to School" Released: April 3, 2008

I Don't Want To Go To School is the second soundtrack album by The Naked Brothers Band, serving as the soundtrack for the second season of The Naked Brothers Band. The album was released as a deluxe fanpack that includes a poster, lyrics and two bonus tracks.

== Background ==
=== Development ===
When the band's mockumentary television series was commissioned for a second season, the boys' mother Polly Draper asked her sons to record a new album. Initially, the siblings started to write new songs in 2007. Nat Wolff wrote the title's hit track, "I Don't Want to Go to School", after pestering his parents to stay home from school, because if he did he would write a song. Subsequently, Nat wrote the song and then he was sent to school anyway.

=== Recording ===
The band began recording their new album in mid-2007. The songs were recorded for the second season of The Naked Brothers Band television series. Recording took as short as three months, which ended in October 2007.

=== Release ===
The album was slated for an April 2008 release, just five months after their debut album, "The Naked Brothers Band". Nat and Alex released two versions, the normal album and a fan pack edition, including two bonus tracks, a poster with lyrics and a DVD with behind the scenes. It ranked #23 on the top 200 Billboard charts for 2 weeks.

== Singles ==
The album released one single, the title track, "I Don't Want to Go to School". The single was released on April 3, 2008, along with a music video, which features various clips from Season 2.

== Track listings ==
All tracks are written by Nat Wolff, except "Changing", "Why" and "Three Is Enough" by Alex Wolff.

Deluxe Version Track Listing
No.	Title	Length
1.	"I Don't Want To Go To School" (Title Track, from "Sidekicks")	2:52
2.	"Eventually" (from "Polar Bears")	3:31
3.	"Mystery Girl" (from "Sidekicks")	2:20
4.	"I'll Do Anything" (from "Polar Bears")	3:02
5.	"I've Got A Question" (from "Polar Bears")	4:32
6.	"Body I Occupy" (from "Cleveland")	4:46
7.	"Why" (from "Polar Bears")	3:22
8.	"If You Can Make It Through The Rain" (from "The Bar Mitzvah")	2:55
9.	"Proof Of My Love" (from "The Talk Show")	2:54
10.	"Great Trip" (from "Great Trip")	2:44
11.	"Three Is Enough" (from "Three Is Enough")	2:55
12.	"Everybody's Cried At Least Once" (from "Everybody's Cried At Least Once")	3:20
13.	"Tall Girls, Short Girls... You" (from "The County Fair")	2:30
14.	"Changing" (from "Uncle Miles")	4:00
15.	"School Outro" (Bonus Hidden Track)	1:02
16.	"School Outro [Extended Version]" (iTunes Album only)	1:50
17.	"I Don't Want To Go To School" (Music Video, iTunes album only)	2:54

== Personnel ==
- Backing Vocals – Angela Clemmons, Dana Calitri, Debi Derryberry, Janice Pendarvis, Nedra Neal*, Russel Velazquez*, Tawatha Agee*, Vaneese Thomas
- Bass – Bob Glaub
- Cello – Erik Friedlander
- Drums – Matt Laug
- Drums, Percussion – Mike Baird
- Drums, Vocals – Alex Wolff
- Edited By [Digital] – Roger Lian
- Engineer – Tom McCauley
- Guitar – Craig Stull, Mike Butler, Thor Laewe*
- Guitar [Pedal Steel] – Joshua Grange
- Guitar, Piano, Vocals, Backing Vocals – Nat Wolff
- Mastered By – Howie Weinberg
- Percussion – M.B. Gordy
- Producer [Additional Production] – Daniel Wise
- Producer, Accordion, Arranged By, Keyboards – Michael Wolff
- Producer, Arranged By, Strings, Keyboards – Michael Levine
- Saxophone [Alto And Tenor] – Lou Marini
- Trombone – Larry Farrell
- Trumpet – Alan Rubin, Lew Soloff

== Reviews ==
Professional ratings
Review scores
Source	Rating
AllMusic	link
Entertainment Weekly	(B+) link

AllMusic gave the album 3½ stars, calling it a great effort after the band's debut soundtrack The Naked Brothers Band, which was released in October 2007. The titular song was covered by Casey and His Brother on the Uncle Muscles Hour variety show in 2009.
