= The Cat and the Moon =

- Theatrical release poster
- Directed by: Alex Wolff
- Written by: Alex Wolff
- Produced by: Alex Wolff; Ken H. Keller; Caron Rudner
- Starring: Alex Wolff; Mike Epps; Skyler Gisondo; Tommy Nelson; Stefania LaVie Owen; Patricia Pinto
- Cinematography: Anthony Savini
- Edited by: Frank Reynolds
- Music by: Alex Wolff; Michael Wolff
- Production company: Related Pictures
- Distributed by: FilmRise
- Release dates: July 31, 2019 (SAFILM); October 25, 2019 (United States)
- Running time: 114 minutes
- Country: United States
- Language: English

The Cat and the Moon is a 2019 American coming-of-age drama film written and directed by Alex Wolff, who stars alongside Mike Epps, Skyler Gisondo, Tommy Nelson, Patricia Pinto, and Stefania LaVie Owen. The film had its world premiere at the San Antonio Film Festival on July 31, 2019. It was released by FilmRise on October 25, 2019, in select theaters in New York City and Los Angeles, as well as through digital and on-demand services.

== Plot ==
During his mother's rehabilitation time, Nick moves to New York to stay with an old musician friend of his father's, named Cal. On his way to his school, Nick considers attempting suicide by jumping in front of an oncoming train but at the last minute, is spooked back. Upon arriving at school, he meets a girl named Eliza. After his first class, Nick is in the bathroom attempting to get high. Two guys walk in and befriend him named Seamus and Russell. He is then invited by them to a party. He is introduced to Skylar and Eliza again, after it is revealed that Eliza and Seamus are dating. At the party, Eliza and Nick bond over childhood memories and the piano. Meanwhile, Seamus receives a handjob from a random girl at the party. The next day, Seamus hints that he cheated on Eliza and tells Nick not to tell her. On a Friday night out, Russel buys illegal drugs from a black man standing in the street but calls the man the n-word. The man threatens Russell with a gun before leaving. At another party, Nick and his friends get high on the drugs that Russell bought. Seamus again cheats on Eliza as he gives another girl oral in the bathroom, which Nick walks in on. A drunk Lola takes Nick to the bedroom and makes out with him, but is interrupted by a group of boys who taunt Nick into fighting. Nick and his friends bring Lola home, and Eliza has sex with Nick. Cal tells Nick the next day that his mother is getting but then tells Nick about staying in New York. On a bus ride, Nick is overwhelmed with emotion seeing Seamus with Eliza, and attempts suicide again, but returns home vomiting and has an emotional breakdown with Cal. The next day at school, Seamus beats Nick for having sex with Eliza. Later that day, Eliza talks to Nick and the two part ways. At the farewell party, Seamus and Nick make peace, and Nick gives Seamus a book on French naughty words. Nick looks at Eliza for the final time.

== Cast ==
- Alex Wolff as Nick
- Mike Epps as Cal
- Skyler Gisondo as Seamus
- Stefania LaVie Owen as Eliza
- Tommy Nelson as Russell
- Giullian Yao Gioiello as Skyler
- Mischa Barton as Jessica Petersen
- Patricia Pinto as Herself
- Paula Rossman as Christine

== Reception ==
On Rotten Tomatoes the film has an approval rating of 78% based on reviews from nine critics, with an average rating of 8.5/10. On Metacritic the film has a score of 63 based on reviews from 5 critics, indicating "generally favorable reviews".

Dennis Harvey of Variety wrote: "While the gist here is a familiar one of coming-of-age seriocomedy, Wolff avoids predictable beats, letting significant insights emerge almost incidentally rather than milking them for melodramatic effect."
