= Nat Wolff =

American actor, musician, and singer-songwriter

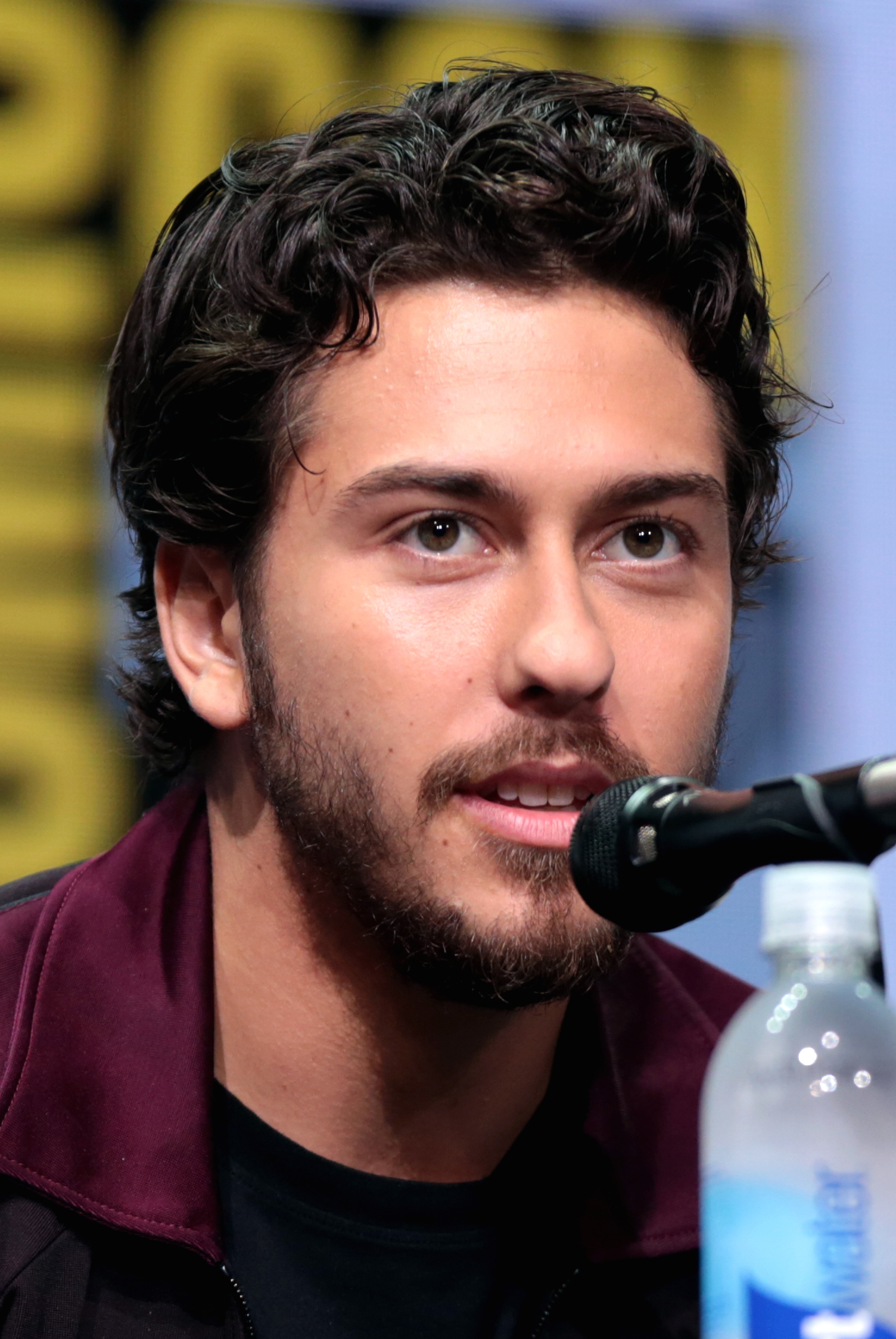
- Wolff at the 2017 San Diego Comic-Con
- Born: Nathaniel Marvin Wolff; December 17, 1994 (age 31); Los Angeles, California, U.S.
- Occupations: Actor; musician
- Years active: 2003–present
- Parents: Michael Wolff; Polly Draper
- Relatives: Alex Wolff (brother); William Henry Draper Jr. (great-grandfather); William Henry Draper III (grandfather); Tim Draper (uncle); Jesse Draper (cousin)
- Musical career
- Genres: Pop; rock; indie
- Instruments: Vocals; guitar; keyboards
- Labels: Columbia; Nick; Sony BMG; SaddleUp; RED Music
- Member of: Nat & Alex Wolff
- Formerly of: The Naked Brothers Band

Nathaniel Marvin Wolff (born December 17, 1994) is an American actor, musician, and singer-songwriter. He initially gained recognition for composing the music for The Naked Brothers Band (2007–2009), a Nickelodeon television series he starred in with his younger brother, Alex, that was created by his actress mother, Polly Draper. Wolff's jazz musician father, Michael Wolff, co-produced the series' soundtrack albums The Naked Brothers Band (2007) and I Don't Want to Go to School (2008), both of which placed the 23rd spot on the Billboard 200 charts.

After the Nickelodeon series concluded, he and his brother formed the music duo Nat & Alex Wolff and they released the albums Black Sheep (2011), Public Places (2016), and Table for Two (2023). Wolff later became known for his lead role in the film Paper Towns (2015) and starring in other movies, such as Admission (2013), Behaving Badly (2013), Palo Alto (2013), The Fault in Our Stars (2014), Ashby (2015), Home Again (2017), the Netflix adaptation of Death Note (2017), Stella's Last Weekend (2018), Rosy (2018), and Mortal (2020).

== Early life ==
Wolff was born on December 17, 1994, in Los Angeles, California, to jazz musician Michael Wolff and actress Polly Draper. He is the older brother of actor and musician Alex Wolff. His uncle is venture capitalist Tim Draper, and he is a cousin to TV personality and venture capitalist Jesse Draper. He is also a maternal grandson of venture capitalist and civic leader William Henry Draper III, and a great-grandson to banker and diplomat William Henry Draper, Jr. His father is Jewish, while his mother is from a Christian background, and Wolff was raised "culturally Jewish."

Wolff has Tourette's syndrome that he inherited from his father.

When he and his younger brother were toddlers, they climbed out of the bathtub and referred to themselves as "the naked brothers band", which inspired the name of the Nickelodeon TV series.

Wolff taught himself to play major and minor chords on the piano at the age of 4. As his father recalls, "I asked him, 'How did you learn them?' He said, 'Dad, they're right here.' I said, 'What are those chords?' He said, 'These are my proud chords.'" Around this age, his passion for The Beatles emboldened him to start writing his own songs. Throughout the years he attended preschool, he, alongside his best friends, constructed a band called The Silver Boulders.

In the wake of the September 11, 2001, terrorist attacks, he held his seventh birthday party outside his apartment, where he and his band performed a song he composed called "Firefighters". The benefit concert was a success; it garnered over $46,000 and was donated to the families of New York City Fire Department's Squad 18.

As an 8 year old, Wolff placed a sign on his bedroom door stating: "I want to be a child actor!" In response, his mother appeased him by suggesting they film a home movie titled Don't Eat Off My Plate, which later served as the basis for The Naked Brothers Band: The Movie.

Despite the success of the subsequent Nickelodeon series over the course of three seasons, the network proposed to shoot a 30 TV movie fourth season during the school year, leading his parents to cancel the series in 2009. From the beginning, they were hesitant to expose him and his brother to stardom at a young age and later agreed to the series spin-off on the provision that filming would take place only during the summer and early fall, allowing him and his brother to proceed with their enrollment at private school in New York City.

In 2008, Wolff, then aged 13, wrote a song called "Yes We Can" that was featured in the Nickelodeon TV series, as a tribute to Barack Obama's presidential campaign. The song was overheard by Obama and his two daughters, who endorsed it and called him to express their gratitude.

== Career ==
"Having our life turned into a mockumentary wasn't as big a deal as some would think. We took all the friendships, Alex's one liners, and my music and put it into a storyline; it was a heightened reality... The show created a great audience for us..."

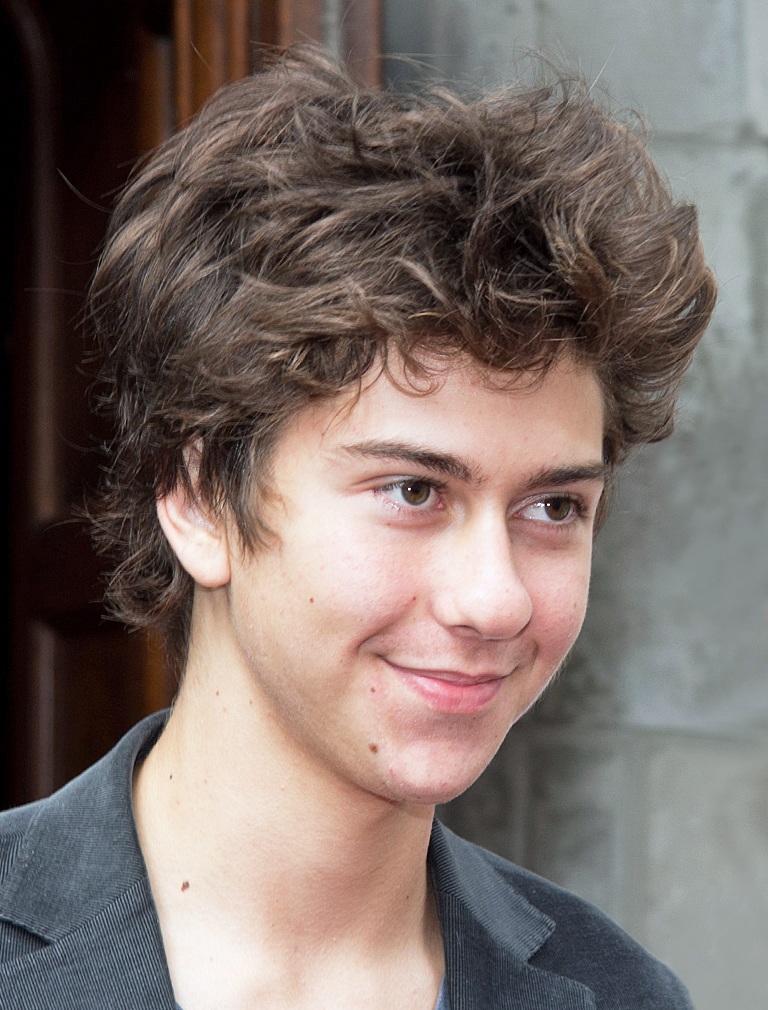
Wolff at the 2011 Toronto International Film Festival

During his childhood, Wolff began his acting career off-Broadway with a minor role in his mother's play Getting into Heaven (2003) and in Heartbeat to Baghdad (2004), both staged at The Flea Theater in Manhattan, New York. At this time, he frequently performed at the Improv Comedy Club, also located in Manhattan.

He later gained recognition, at the age of 9, for starring in and contributing lead vocals, lyrics, and instrumentation for The Naked Brothers Band film that was written and directed by his mother and screened at the Hamptons International Film Festival in 2005.

However, Wolff did not first rise to prominence until he was 12 years old after the film was bought by a former Nickelodeon executive at the festival as the pilot for the Nickelodeon television series of the same name (2007–09). The series was also created, showran, written, and directed by his mother, while his brother was featured in the ensemble cast and played the drums. His father co-starred, as well as produced and supervised the music. It released two soundtrack albums that were charted on the Billboard 200, with the single "Crazy Car" ranking #83 on the Billboard Hot 100. Wolff, who was 9 when he recorded the song under the guidance of his father in the studio, is believed to be the youngest person to compose a song featured on the Billboard charts.

His TV movie credits include a cameo in Mr. Troop Mom (2009), as well as starring alongside his brother in Stella's Last Weekend (2018), which was written and directed by his mother, who also co-starred. He appeared in the Netflix film based on the manga of the same name Death Note (2017), and was cast in several theatrical movies, such as New Year's Eve (2011), Peace, Love & Misunderstanding (2011), Admission (2013), Palo Alto (2013), Behaving Badly (2014), The Fault in Our Stars (2015), Paper Towns (2015), Home Again (2017), Rosy (2018), Good Posture (2019), and Mortal (2020).

Wolff's other off-Broadway performances comprise roles in his brother's play What Would Woody Do? (2010) at The Flea Theater, and in the revival of Sam Shepard's play Buried Child (2016).

In 2024, he and his brother toured with Billie Eilish as the opening act for the American leg of her Hit Me Hard and Soft tour.

== Personal life ==
He and Billie Eilish met in December 2023 and have been romantically linked since June 2025. In May 2026, they made their red carpet debut as a couple at the Los Angeles premiere of Eilish's concert film, Billie Eilish – Hit Me Hard and Soft: The Tour (Live in 3D).

== Filmography ==
=== Film ===
Year	Title	Role	Notes
2005	The Naked Brothers Band: The Movie	Nat Wolff / Himself	
2011	New Year's Eve	Walter	
2011	Special Things To Do	Cliff Finley	Short film
2011	Peace, Love & Misunderstanding	Jake Hudson	
2012	Stuck in Love	Rusty Borgens	
2013	Admission	Jeremiah Balakian	
2013	The Last Keepers	Simon	
2013	Palo Alto	Fred	
2014	The Fault in Our Stars	Isaac	
2014	Behaving Badly	Rick Stevens	
2015	Grandma	Cam	
2015	Ashby	Ed Wallis	
2015	Paper Towns	Quentin "Q" Jacobsen	
2015	The Intern	Justin	
2016	In Dubious Battle	Jim Nolan	
2017	Leap!	Victor	Voice role
2017	Death Note	Light Turner	
2017	Home Again	Teddy Dorsey	
2018	Rosy	Doug	
2018	Stella's Last Weekend	Jack	
2019	The Kill Team	Andrew Briggman	
2019	Good Posture	Jon	
2019	Semper Fi	Oyster	
2020	Mortal	Eric	
2020	Body Cam	Danny	
2020	Mainstream	Jake	
2021	The Great Gatsby Live Read!	Jay Gatsby	
2022	Murder at Yellowstone City	Young Jim Ambrose	
2023	Justice League x RWBY: Super Heroes & Huntsmen, Part One	Batman / Bruce Wayne	Voice role
2024	Which Brings Me to You	Will	Also producer
2024	Pavements	Scott Kannberg	
2025	Play Dirty	Kincaid	
TBA	She Gets It from Me	John	Post-production

=== Television ===
Year	Title	Role	Notes
2007–2009	The Naked Brothers Band	Nat Wolff / Himself	Main cast; 42 episodes
2009	Mr. Troop Mom	Nat Wolff / Himself	Television film
2017	Room 104	Elder Joseph	Episode: "The Missionaries"
2020–21	The Stand	Lloyd Henreid	Television miniseries; main cast
2022	Joe vs. Carole	Travis Maldonado	Limited series
2023	The Consultant	Craig	Main cast; 8 episodes

=== Music videos ===
Year	Song	Artist	Role	Notes
2019	"Graduation"	Benny Blanco, Juice Wrld	Jasper	
2024	"Chihiro"	Billie Eilish	Love-interest	

== Stage ==
Year	Title	Role	Venue	Notes
2016	Buried Child	Vince	The New Group	Off-Broadway
2023	The Seagull/Woodstock, NY	Kevin	The New Group	Off-Broadway

== Albums ==
Soundtrack albums as part of the TV series The Naked Brothers Band

- 2007: The Naked Brothers Band: Music from the Movie
- 2007: The Naked Brothers Band
- 2008: I Don't Want to Go to School
- 2013: Throwbacks

Studio albums as duo Nat & Alex Wolff

- 2011: Black Sheep
- 2016: Public Places
- 2023: Table for Two

Singles

- 2014: Cities + It's Just Love
- 2014: Last Station + Rules
- 2014: Where I'm Goin' + Rock Star
- 2019: Cool Kids + Note

== Awards and nominations ==
Year	Association	Category	Work	Result
2005	Hamptons International Film Festival	Audience Award – Family Feature Film	The Naked Brothers Band: The Movie	Won
2007	BMI Awards	Cable Award	The Naked Brothers Band	Won
2008	Young Artist Awards	Best Young Ensemble Performance in a TV Series	The Naked Brothers Band	Nominated
2009	Young Artist Awards	Best Performance in a TV Series (Comedy or Drama) – Leading Young Actor	The Naked Brothers Band	Nominated
2009	Nickelodeon Kids' Choice Awards	Favorite Television Actor	The Naked Brothers Band	Nominated
2010	Young Artist Awards	Best Performance in a TV Series (Comedy or Drama) – Leading Young Actor	The Naked Brothers Band	Nominated
2014	Young Hollywood Awards	Breakthrough Actor	Himself	Nominated
2014	Teen Choice Awards	Choice Movie: Scene Stealer	The Fault in Our Stars	Won
2014	Teen Choice Awards	Choice Movie: Chemistry (with Ansel Elgort and Shailene Woodley)	The Fault in Our Stars	Won
2015	Teen Choice Awards	Choice Summer Movie Star: Male	Paper Towns	Nominated
2015	CinemaCon Awards	Rising Star	Himself	Won

The Naked Brothers Band film and TV series earned Wolff two awards and many other nominations. In 2005, The Naked Brothers Band: The Movie obtained him an Audience Award for a Family Feature Film. He received a Broadcast Music, Inc. Cable Award for composing the series' music in 2007. In 2008, Wolff was given a Young Artist Award nomination for Best Young Ensemble Performance in a TV Series. Wolff took another Young Artist Award nomination for Best Performance in a TV Series (Comedy or Drama) - Leading Young Actor and one Kids' Choice Award nomination for Best TV Actor in 2009. In 2010, he was also given a Young Artist Award nomination for Best Performance in a TV Series (Comedy or Drama) – Leading Young Actor.

In 2014, Wolff won two Teen Choice Awards in the categories of Choice Movie: Scene Stealer and Choice Movie: Chemistry for The Fault in Our Stars. That following year in 2015, he was honored with a CinemaCon Award for a Rising Star.
