= Nat & Alex Wolff =

American rock duo

- Also known as: The Naked Brothers Band
- Origin: New York City, New York, U.S.
- Genres: Pop rock
- Years active: 2004–present
- Labels: Nickelodeon; Columbia; SME; Saddleup
- Members: Alex Wolff; Nat Wolff

Nat & Alex Wolff are an American pop rock duo from New York City, consisting of actor and musician siblings, Nat and Alex Wolff. The siblings' musical efforts were initially discovered during their work on the Nickelodeon television series The Naked Brothers Band, which was created and produced by their mother, actress Polly Draper. It was adapted from the self-titled mockumentary film that Draper wrote and directed. The duo's initial teen pop boy band called "The Naked Brothers Band" was depicted as part of its participation in their Nickelodeon series that aired from 2007 to 2009.

== History ==
=== 2001–2004: Early years and the Silver Boulders ===
While Nat was in preschool, he formed a band called the Silver Boulders with his friends, which included David, Thomas, Josh, Walker (son of news journalist Ann Curry), and Cal (son of actress Julianne Moore). Nat wrote his first song titled "Mama Don't Let Me Cry" at the age of five. At the time, Alex was not allowed to be part of the band, as Nat felt it would be unfashionable to have a brother in the same ensemble.

When Nat, who lives in Lower Manhattan of New York City, was four years old, his father, jazz pianist Michael Wolff (bandleader on The Arsenio Hall Show) played Nat music, primarily jazz. One day, Michael overheard Nat teaching himself how to play major chords on the piano; Nat told his father that they were his "proud chords". After hearing the music of The Beatles, Nat became inspired and watched all the group's films including Help!. On the other hand. Alex discovered how to play the saxophone at the age of two and a half. As recalled by the boys' mother, actress Polly Draper (star on ABC's Thirtysomething), Nat and Alex were infants when they arose from a bath proclaiming, "We're the naked brothers band!"

After the September 11 attacks, six-year-old Nat composed the song "Firefighters" for a benefit he performed with his band, staged behind his Lower Manhattan apartment. Alex desired to be part of the concert, and so Nat created "a fake plastic saxophone" for him to play. The charity ended up raising over $45,000 and was donated to the children of the firefighters who were killed during the terrorist attacks. After the band's charity concert, the band performed shows at Christmas parties and wedding ceremonies.

After being inspired by Ringo Starr from the Beatles, Alex chose the drums as an alternative instrument to play. Alex learned how to play, as he viewed tapes of Starr playing, which resulted in him becoming a proficient drummer. This persuaded Nat to allow Alex to join his band. At the age of 6, Nat composed a melody without lyrics. He later desired to compose a song that sounded like The Beach Boys' music. Subsequently, Nat wrote the song "Crazy Car".

In 2003, Nat was featured in his mother's play Getting Into Heaven at The Flea Theater. Nat also performed in The Heart of Baghdad at the same theater.

=== 2004–2009: The Naked Brothers Band ===
Nat begged his mom to be a child actor by putting signs on his door that said: "I want to be a child actor!" At first, she refused by explaining that it would be too difficult, so she made a compromise with Nat; in 2003, she let him film his own sitcom titled Don't Eat Off My Plate. After that, Nat begged his dad to record a tape in the studio with Alex and him, so Michael arranged a recording session for the three of them in the studio. While Draper saw them recording in the studio, she came up with the idea to make a "mock documentary" about the band as if they were huge like The Beatles. During summer 2004, the film took production at the family's real-life apartment and throughout New York City, at which time Nat was 9 and a half and Alex was 6-and-a-half. Draper wrote and directed The Naked Brothers Band: The Movie, which was designed as an independent family project with a budget under $1,000,000. The film consisted of celebrities who were friends with Draper and Wolff, including Cyndi Lauper, Julianne Moore, Ann Curry, Uma Thurman, Tony Shalhoub, Ricki Lake, Arsenio Hall, and the complete cast of Thirtysomething. Nat Wolff wrote and performed all the songs, except for "That's How It Is", which was written and performed by Alex Wolff.

On October 23, 2005, Draper and Wolff entered the film at the Hamptons International Film Festival, where it won the audience award for family feature film. Meanwhile, Albie Hecht, a former Nickelodeon executive and founder of Spike TV, was in the audience that day. He ended up bringing the film to Nickelodeon, suggesting they develop it into a television series. Tom Asheim, the vice president and general manager of Nickelodeon said:

"At first, we were intrigued by the idea, but we weren't sure kids would get the vague-tongue-and-check-of-it. Then a bunch of us took it home to our own children and they loved it."

Eventually, the staff at Nickelodeon persuaded Draper to put together a television series after comprising with short, 13 episode seasons over the summer and early autumn, so the boys were able to attend private school throughout most of the school year. Draper recalled, "When Nickelodeon first asked us about doing a series, we said, 'How about a cartoon, so the kids could stay normal?' They said, 'No, we love your kids.'" In the summer through the early fall of 2006, the first season of the self-titled series took production. On January 27, 2007, The Naked Brothers Band: The Movie aired on Nickelodeon, and the self-titled series aired February 3. Polly Draper was the creator, head writer, executive producer, and frequent director of the series.

Nat and Alex never really realized how big they were until October 8, 2007. Band members Nat, Alex, Thomas, David, Allie DiMeco (who stars as Rosalina and Nat's crush on the film and TV series), and Qaasim Middleton (who replaced former band-member Josh on the series) had an autograph-signing at Times Square Virgin Megastore for the band's release of their self-titled debut album The Naked Brothers Band. There were 1,500 fans that waited outside of Virgin Megastore for hours; some camped out overnight. They also had a live performance on ABC's Good Morning America with the band's song "I'm Out".

Nat stated that for the series, he would write 14-15 songs for each episode. On April 15, 2008, the brothers released their second album, I Don't Want To Go To School. The album had a total of 12 tracks, along with two bonus tracks, and a poster. As part of a Wal-Mart special sale, it included a DVD featuring a behind-the-scenes glimpse of the Draper-Wolff family and the siblings' bandmates.

The brothers then started their first national-tour, called Nat & Alex Wolff: Fully Clothed & On Tour, which started on November 1, 2008. Nat and Alex, along with professionally trained musicians that include Jacob Hertzog (music director, guitar and backup vocals), Misty Boyce (keyboards and backup vocals), Chris Muir (musician)|Chris Muir (bass and backup vocals), and Boris Pelekh (guitar, drums and backup vocals), performed songs from and even some from the upcoming episodes. Some concerts they performed at include the Capital One Bank Theater in New York City, the Theater of the Living Arts in Philadelphia, the Berkeley Performance Center in Boston, The Roxy in Los Angeles, and the House of Blues in Chicago, New Orleans, Florida and California. The tour ended shortly after on December 14, 2008.

=== 2009–2010: Duo career and touring ===
After The Naked Brothers Band television show ended in 2009, the brothers continued to pursue music but emerged as a duo group, as the duo's old band name was owned by Viacom, a trademark of Nickelodeon. The initial band ended, partially due to the conclusion of the television series, which was abruptly cancelled at the request of Draper, who claimed the production schedule was too much for the brothers, on top of their education.

Frequent touring band members — Jake Hertzog, Boris Pelekh, Chris Muir and Misty Boyce — provided back-up instrumentation for the brothers as they toured in 2008. Following the 2008 tour, the brothers confirmed their first full-length summer tour, titled "Nat & Alex Wolff: Summer Road Trip Tour". It began in June 2009 and ended in early October 2009.

The brothers performed at Pop-Con 2010, alongside Justin Bieber, Selena Gomez, and many other teen performers. Thereafter, the duo performed at the Earth Day 2010 concert in New York and played many new songs there, such as "Fire and Kerosene", "18", "Disappointed" and others. It was during these performances that the brothers realised crowds had begun to shrink, something that come as a surprise to them.

After the brothers completed their tour in 2009, they revealed that they were working on a new studio album, post their Nickelodeon TV series. Two demo tracks — a cover of Bruce Springsteen's song "Dancing In The Dark" and of The Beatles' song, "A Hard Day's Night" — were leaked onto the siblings' official website.

=== 2010–2012: Black Sheep ===
The brothers began recording their first non-Nickelodeon studio album in early 2010. Of the writing process, Nat said, "The material is a bit more mature, as I have matured as a [song]writer." Leading up to the album's release, the brothers starred in their own web series on YouTube, which was written and directed by their mother, Polly Draper. New episodes were uploaded weekly in the lead up to the release of the album; most of which featured snippets of tracks that appeared on the album.

The album, Black Sheep, was released in the fall of 2011. The album was produced by their father and Daniel Wise, a client at The Soundmine Recording Studio.

=== 2013–2020: Smaller Releases and Public Places ===
Following a brief period of touring, in October 2013, Nat & Alex Wolff released an album of previously unreleased songs, entitled Throwbacks. The album primarily consisted of songs the musicians wrote during their time on their Nickelodeon show, The Naked Brothers Band. The songs were initially to be released in 2009, however, due to contracts with the brothers, the rights to the music were occupied by Nickelodeon.

In 2014, the brothers continued to release music, in the form of several double-singles. In late 2014, they released a double-single, "Cities/It's Just Love". Three months later, they released "Last Station/Rules", and, on October 7, an additional double-single, consisting of "Where I'm Goin'" by Alex, and "Rock Star" by Nat, described as 'melodic folk tunes, perfect for a chilly fall day'. An alternate version of Rock Star was also featured in the 2013 teen romance film Palo Alto which included Nat in a starring role.

In 2015, Nat penned and performed the single, "Look Outside", which featured in the feature film, Paper Towns, also starring Nat.

The brothers released their first extended play in November 2016, titled Public Places.

In late 2019, the duo released the double-single, "Cool Kids/Note". Whilst the duo did not release any major efforts over the next couple of years, they continued performing live for fans on their social media accounts, and even reunited with former Naked Brothers Band cast-mates for a live sing-along reunion on Instagram in 2020, during the COVID lockdown. In late 2020, they released the track, "Glue", which was inspired by Fleetwood Mac, the Replacements and the National.

=== 2021-2024: Table For Two and Subsequent Touring ===
As COVID lockdown forced the brothers to share a living space once again, the two started to collaborate on new music, experimenting with different genres and sounds. In September 2022, the brothers released "All Over You", a Prince-inspired genre bending tune, described by Nat as, “the tune you put on the night before you leave town when you’ve just fallen in love." The duo finally released their second studio album, Table For Two, on June 15, 2023. According to Paste Magazine, the Matt Wallace and Tone Def-produced album was 'unrushed, initially meant to come out in 2021, but Alex and Nat chose to push it back while focusing on their ever-more-complex medley of side hustles and big-name gigs.'

Following the album's release, the brothers began touring in January 2024, noting it was the first 'fun' tour they had embarked on in years, and that it was 'just the beginning' of their musical journey.

=== 2024-Present: Third Studio Album ===
In an Instagram post on March 8, 2024, the brothers revealed they had finished their third studio album.

On September 9, 2024, the two were announced to open at shows for Billie Eilish's Hit Me Hard and Soft tour

The duo's third Self Titled album was released on January 16, 2026 .

== Musical style and influences ==
Originally, the band was a bubblegum pop-style group, over time however, the band evolved to have a more rock-based sound. The brothers were inspired by their favorite rock band: the Beatles. Alex learned to play the drums by watching Ringo Starr on the Anthology tapes. Nat and Alex have stated that the two of them were very inspired by Nirvana, the Killers, the Doors, Coldplay, Green Day, The Beach Boys, Billy Joel, Bob Dylan, Neil Young, Simon and Garfunkel, Radiohead and The Rolling Stones

== Band members ==
Current members

- Nat Wolff – vocals, guitar, keyboards, bass (2004–present)
- Alex Wolff – vocals, guitar, piano, drums (2004–present)

Former touring members

- Chris Muir – bass, backing vocals (2008–2009)
- Jake Hertzog – guitar (2008–2009)
- Boris Pelekh – guitar, drums, backing vocals (2008–2009)
- Misty Boyce – keyboards, backing vocals (2008–2009)

== Discography ==
=== Albums ===
As The Naked Brothers Band

Title	Type	Recorded	Release date	Composer(s)	Producer(s)	Label
The Naked Brothers Band: Music from the Movie	Soundtrack / EP	Mid-2004	April 3, 2007	Nat Wolff; Alex Wolff	Michael Wolff	Nickelodeon/Columbia/SME Records
The Naked Brothers Band	Soundtrack	Mid-2004, 2006, & 2007	October 7, 2007	*	Michael Wolff; Michael A. Levine	Nickelodeon/Columbia/SME Records
I Don't Want to Go to School	Soundtrack	Mid-2007	April 15, 2008	*	Michael Wolff; Michael A. Levine	Nickelodeon/Columbia/SME Records

As Nat & Alex Wolff

Title	Type	Recorded	Release date	Composer(s)	Producer(s)	Label
Black Sheep	Studio album	Late 2009 - Mid-2010	October 11, 2011	Nat Wolff; Alex Wolff	Michael Wolff; Daniel Wise	Saddleup Records
Throwbacks	Soundtrack	2008	October 15, 2013	*	Daniel Wise; Peter Asher	*
Public Places	EP	2016	December 16, 2016	*	Nat Wolff; Alex Wolff	*
Table For Two	Studio album	March 2021 - Late 2022	June 15, 2023	*	Matt Wallace Tone Def	*
Nat & Alex Wolff	Studio album	2023 - 2025	January 16, 2026	*		*

=== Singles ===
"The Naked Brothers Band"

- Crazy Car (2005)
- If That's Not Love (2007)
- I Don't Want To Go To School (2008)
- Face In The Hall (2008)

"Nat & Alex Wolff"

- Thump, Thump, Thump (2011)
- Cities / It's Just Love (2014)
- Last Station / Rules (2014)
- Where I'm Goin' / Rock Star (2014)
- Look Outside (2015)
- Cool Kids / Note (2019)
- Glue (2020)
- All Over You (2022)
- Head’s On Loose (2023)
- If I’m Gonna Die (2023)
- Backup Plan (2024)
- Soft Kissing Hour (2024)
- If You Never Left Me (2025)
- Empty House (2025)
- Jack (2025)
- Tough (2025)

== Tours ==
Event	Title	Dates
Tour	Fully Clothed and On Tour	November 1, 2008 – December 14, 2008
Tour	Summer Road Trip Tour	July 2009 - October 2009
Tour	Black Sheep Tour	February 2012 - December 2012
Tour	Table for Two Tour	January 2024 -
