= Elias Munk =

Danish actor (born 1992)

- Born: 21 May 1992 (age 34); Alken, Denmark
- Education: New York Film Academy
- Occupations: Actor, Writer
- Years active: 2013–present

Elias Græsbøll Munk-Petersen (born 21 May 1992) is a Danish actor. He is also a writer, who wrote his first novel The Stupidity of Youth at the age of 17. Munk has written several other short stories since.

He was selected as Northern Light Talent at the 65th Berlin International Film Festival. Munk's career in Denmark kicked off with a lead role in the feature film For My Brother by Brian Bang. This led to a lead role in the short fiction story Exit Neverland by Chadi Abdul-Karim. That story was nominated for a Robert award and won the ÉCU The European Independent Film Festival award for best short story. In 2014, Munk played lead in the short story When the Sun Shines that won the Guldægget Award for best short story, with Munk also winning the Guldægget Award for best actor. The success of the short movie led to the making of the feature film that premiered in Denmark at the CPH PIX Film Festival in October 2016. In the same year, at the Subtitle Film Festival, Munk won a shared award for Outstanding Performance with Laura Kjær for their roles in When The Sun Shines.

== Filmography ==
=== Actor ===
Year	Title	Role	Notes
2013	Exit Neverland	Daniel	Nominated – Robert Award for Best Short Fiction
2014	Zombiehagen	Kæresten	
2014	For my brother	Aske	
2015	Ødeland	Arek	
2015	Jeanne d'Arc	Spielberg	
2015	Go Go Berlin: Electric Lives	Group Leader	
2015	Sommeren '92	Troels Rasmussen	
2016	Stærkere	Jonas Hansen	
2016	Når solen skinner	Sofus	Winner - Subtitle Film Festival for Outstanding Performance
2016	Gælden	Johnny (Ung)	
2016	Vindmøllernes Sus	Kenni	
2019	De dødes tjern	Harald	

=== Director ===
- 2014: Kadie Elder First Time He Kissed a Boy (Short movie)
- 2015: Go Go Berlin: Electric Lives (Short movie)
