= The Tic Code =

- DVD release cover
- Directed by: Gary Winick
- Written by: Polly Draper
- Produced by: Polly Draper (uncredited); Michael Wolff; Karen Tangorra; Midge Sanford (uncredited); Sarah Pillsbury (uncredited); Larry Meistrich (uncredited)
- Starring: Gregory Hines; Polly Draper; Christopher George Marquette; Bill Nunn
- Cinematography: Wolfgang Held
- Edited by: Bill Pankow; Kate Sanford; Henk Van Eeghen
- Music by: Michael Wolff
- Production companies: Sanford/Pillsbury Productions; Jazz Films; Gun For Hire Films
- Distributed by: Lions Gate Films
- Release dates: June 1998 (Newport); April 2, 1999 (Starz); August 4, 2000 (Limited)
- Running time: 91 minutes
- Country: United States
- Language: English
- Budget: US$2 million
- Box office: US$205,000

The Tic Code (also known as Lessons in the Tic Code) is a drama film directed by Gary Winick and written by Polly Draper. It tells of a single mother, the relationship she forms with a jazz musician who has Tourette syndrome, and her young son—a piano prodigy—also with the disorder. The musician and the boy form a friendship, and the film is loosely based upon the experiences of Draper's jazz musician husband Michael Wolff, who provided the film's score. Draper, known for her role in Thirtysomething, portrays the mother; Gregory Hines plays the musician; and Christopher George Marquette stars as the young boy.

Principal photography took place in 1997 in New York City. The Tic Code appeared at several film festivals in 1998 and 1999, where it won a number of awards. It received a limited theatrical release in the United States on August 4, 2000, and a DVD release in February 2001. Critical response to the film was generally favorable.

== Plot ==
Miles Caraday is a jazz piano prodigy with Tourette syndrome. Miles has a school friend, Todd who seems not to be bothered by Miles' condition. Miles wants to become a jazz pianist against the wishes of his classical-oriented instructor Miss Gimpole. At a local nightspot, Miles becomes friends with a jazz saxophonist, Tyrone Pike, who also has Tourette's but learned ways to cover up his condition.

In the film, Tyrone tells Denny Harley who bullies Miles that the reason they both tic is:
Tyrone: [...] because we both know the code.
Denny: [...] Code, what code?
Tyrone: [...] 'the tic code'.
Denny: So you and Miles made this whole thing up?
Tyrone: No, the C.I.A. did; a lot of people know about it now.

== Cast ==
- Gregory Hines plays Tyrone Pike, a jazz saxophonist and Laura's boyfriend. Hines also studied Wolff to imitate his ticcing and develop the character. During filming, Hines committed himself to spending a full day as a Touretter; after being stared at by a taxi driver, Hines reflected that he had not considered how embarrassing the disorder could be. He also studied tapes of Alex Foster to learn how to finger the saxophone.
- Polly Draper plays Laura Caraday, a single mother.
- Christopher Marquette plays Laura's son Miles Caraday, a young jazz piano prodigy with Tourette syndrome. Marquette learned how to play the piano from Wolff. He also studied ticcing from Wolff and watched videotapes, including the documentary Twitch and Shout, to perfect his technique. In preparation for the role, Marquette practiced ticcing in public.

The film also features Desmond Robertson as Todd, Miles' friend; Carol Kane as Miss Gimpole, Miles' music instructor and teacher; Robert Iler as Denny Harley, the school bully; Bill Nunn and Tony Shalhoub as bartenders Kingston and Phil; Camryn Manheim as Mrs. Lily Swensrut, one of Laura's customers; and James McCaffrey as Michael Caraday, Laura's ex-husband. Wolff has a minor appearance as Sound Engineer #2.

== Filming ==
The Tic Code was in development for five years before finally being made. Principal photography took place on location in New York City in 1997, on a budget of US$2 million. The film was directed by Gary Winick, who took over after original director Norman René died during pre-production. It was written by Polly Draper, who also produced alongside Karen Tangorra, Midge Sanford, Sarah Pillsbury and Larry Meistrich. Draper based the screenplay on the experiences of her jazz musician husband Michael Wolff, who has Tourette syndrome. Wolff's involvement as co-producer ensured the cooperation of jazz club The Village Vanguard, which granted the production permission to use its name and exterior shots of the building. Herman Leonard loaned his collection of photographs of famous jazz musicians, and the Blue Note jazz club allowed its name to be used on fake fliers. Wolff provided the film's score and played the piano. Alex Foster also contributed to the soundtrack for scenes of Hines playing the saxophone.

== Post production ==
The Tic Code appeared at the first Newport International Film Festival in June 1998. It was subsequently shown at the Wine Country Film Festival in July–August 1998, and at the Hamptons International Film Festival in October 1998. The film also appeared at several film festivals in 1999, including the Vancouver Reel to Real Festival on March 3, 1999, the Berlin International Film Festival, and the Giffoni Film Festival. On April 2, 1999, it aired on the Starz! television network. The distribution rights were subsequently picked up by insurance company-backed film library Chaross Pictures, which buys independent films that have run into financial difficulty before it was sold to Lions Gate Entertainment in May 1999. Lions Gate gave The Tic Code a limited theatrical release in the United States, opening on August 4, 2000. It grossed US$205,000 from nine theaters and closed on October 5, 2000.

== Awards and reception ==
The Tic Code received generally favorable reviews from film critics. Rotten Tomatoes reported that 77% of critics gave the film a positive write-up, based upon a sample of 26, with an average score of 6.6/10. At Metacritic, which assigns a normalized rating out of 100 to reviews from mainstream critics, the film received an average score of 64, based on 17 reviews.

In 1998, the film won the Audience Award for Most Popular Feature at the Hamptons International Film Festival. It also received a "special recognition" award from the festival jury. Polly Draper and Christopher George Marquette earned Bronze Gryphon Awards for Best Actress and Best Actor, respectively, at the Giffoni Film Festival in 1999. That same year, the film obtained the Crystal Bear Award at the Berlin International Film Festival, as well as the Best Overall Film Award at the first Vancouver Reel to Reel Festival.
