= Boris Pelekh =

Boris Pelekh Борис Пелех
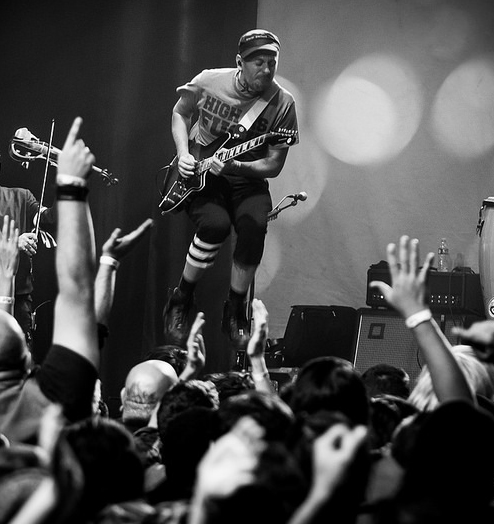
- Boris Pelekh playing with Gogol Bordello in Las Vegas, November 2016.

Background information
- Born: 17 November 1981 (age 44); Moscow, Russian SFSR, Soviet Union
- Genres: Gypsy punk, Art Rock, Jazz
- Instruments: Guitar, vocals, beat box
- Years active: 2002–present
- Website: http://www.heyguy.com

Boris Fridrikhovich Pelekh (Note: Russian: Борис Фридрихович Пелех, romanized: Boris Fridrikhovich Pelekh) (born 17 November 1981) is a Russian-born American singer, composer, guitarist, most notable as the guitarist of the Gypsy punk band Gogol Bordello. He moved to New York City in 1991, at the age of 9, and joined Gogol Bordello in 2015. Aside from his work in Gogol Bordello, he also worked with the Nickelodeon duo Nat and Alex Wolff from 2008 to 2011.

Pelekh is the frontman, guitarist and primary songwriter of rock band Hey Guy.

Pelekh is the frontman, guitarist and primary songwriter of indie-folk-electro-pop band Boris and the Joy.
