= Victoria (2013 film) =

2013 Norwegian drama film

- Film poster
- Directed by: Torun Lian
- Starring: Jakob Oftebro; Iben Akerlie; Bill Skarsgård
- Release date: 1 March 2013
- Running time: 105 minutes
- Country: Norway
- Language: Norwegian

Victoria is a 2013 Norwegian drama film directed by Torun Lian, starring Jakob Oftebro, Iben Akerlie and Bill Skarsgård. It tells the story of the love between the daughter of a landowner and the son of a local miller. The film is based on the novel Victoria by Knut Hamsun. It was released in Norway on 1 March 2013. Fridtjov Såheim received the Amanda Award for Best Actor in a Supporting Role.

== Cast ==
- Iben Akerlie as Victoria
- Jakob Oftebro as Johannes
- Bill Skarsgård as Otto
- Fridtjov Såheim as Victoria's father
