= Iben Akerlie =

Norwegian actress and author (born 1988)

- Born: 5 March 1988 (age 38); Oslo, Norway
- Education: University of Oslo
- Occupations: actor; writer; author
- Years active: 2002-present
- Partner: Jakob Oftebro (2013 – 2017)

Iben Marie Akerlie (born 5 March 1988) is a Norwegian actress, writer, and children's book author who has appeared in several films. She made her debut as an author in autumn 2016 with the children's book Lars is LOL. She is best known for her roles in the TV series Mammon (since 2016) and her title role in the film Victoria (2013). She also authored a children's literature novel titled Lars er LOL (2016).

== Career ==
Akerlie has starred in the short film Bulle barre bor here, which was made by Sirin Eide. In 2001 she played in the film Glasskår, based on Harald Rosenløw Eeg's novel Glasskår where she had a small role as the girl Wendy. In 2013, now as an adult, she played the title role in the feature film Victoria, a film adaptation of Knut Hamsun's novel Victoria. In 2016, she had the role of the prime minister's daughter in season 2 of the NRK series Mammon. The following year she was in TV 2 's crime series Hvor er Thea? In 2017 she was in the film Rett vest and in 2019 De dødes tjern .

In 2023, she was current in the TV 2 series Innebandykrigerne . Akerlie has also participated in several seasons of the quiz program Alle mot alle on TVNorge, together with her regular partner Alex Rosén. She was also nominated for ARK's children's book award for Sommeren alt sichten i 2022.

== Filmography ==
=== Films ===
Year	Title	Role	Notes
2013	Victoria	Victoria	
2019	Lake of Death	Lillian	
2020	Mortal	Christine	
