= Hair Brained =

2013 film

- Film poster
- Directed by: Billy Kent
- Screenplay by: Adam Wierzbianski
- Story by: Adam Wierzbianski; Sarah Bird; Billy Kent
- Produced by: Sarah Bird; Billy Kent; Avram Ludwig
- Starring: Brendan Fraser; Alex Wolff
- Cinematography: Charlie Libin
- Edited by: Paul Bertino
- Music by: The Newton Brothers
- Production company: Love Lane Pictures
- Distributed by: Vertical Entertainment
- Release date: May 31, 2013 (Brooklyn)
- Running time: 97 minutes
- Country: United States
- Language: English

Hair Brained is a 2013 American fantasy comedy-drama film directed by Billy Kent, and starring Brendan Fraser and Alex Wolff.

== Plot ==
After being rejected from Harvard University, 14-year old genius and outcast Eli Pettifog (Alex Wolff) finds himself at Whittman College, an Ivy League wannabe. Eli, the hair brained meets 41-year-old freshman Leo Searly (Brendan Fraser), a gambler whose world has imploded and has dropped out of life to enroll in college. The odd duo becomes unlikely friends in this comedic coming-of-age film.

== Cast ==
- Brendan Fraser as Leo Searly
- Alex Wolff as Eli Pettifog
- Parker Posey as Sheila Pettifog
- Julia Garner as Shauna Holder
- Michael Oberholtzer as Laird
- Greta Lee as Gertrude Lee
- Teddy Bergman as Alan Warren
- Robin de Jesús as Romeo Torres
- Elisabeth Hower as Eve Hansen
- Austin Pendleton as Dapper Man
- Toby Huss as Whittman Moderator / Brad the Announcer
- Josefina Scaglione as Camilla
- Kimiko Glenn as Perky Girl
- Fred Melamed as Benny Greenberg
- Lizzy DeClement as Sophie Searly

== Reception ==
On the review aggregator website Rotten Tomatoes, 22% of 18 critics' reviews are positive. Metacritic, which uses a weighted average, assigned the film a score of 48 out of 100, based on 8 critics, indicating "mixed or average" reviews.

On Screen Anarchy, Andrew Mack wrote that "not all of the humor hit its mark (...) For the most part, it is a pleasant film to watch and is charming in its own right." Christy Lemire of RogerEbert.com awarded the film 1/4 stars calling it a "painfully contrived and self-consciously quirky from the word go."
