= Lake of Death (film) =

2019 supernatural horror film by Nini Bull Robsahm

- Norwegian theatrical release poster
- Directed by: Nini Bull Robsahm
- Written by: Nini Bull Robsahm
- Produced by: Fredrik Pryser
- Starring: Iben Akerlie; Jakob Schøyen Andersen; Sophia Lie; Elias Munk
- Cinematography: Axel Mustad
- Edited by: Bob Murawski
- Music by: John Debney
- Production company: Canopy Film
- Distributed by: SF Studios; Shudder
- Release date: November 1, 2019 (Norway)
- Running time: 94 minutes
- Country: Norway
- Language: Norwegian
- Box office: $380,324

Lake of Death (Norwegian title: De dødes tjern) is a 2019 Norwegian supernatural horror film written and directed by Nini Bull Robsahm and starring Iben Akerlie, Jakob Schøyen Andersen, Sophia Lie, and Elias Munk. The film is a remake of the 1958 horror film Lake of the Dead directed by Kåre Bergstrøm, which is itself based on André Bjerke’s 1942 novel of the same name. The film was released on 1 November 2019 in Norway and on 16 July 2020 in the U.S. via Shudder.

== Plot ==
A year after the death of her troubled twin brother, Lilian returns to her forest house near the lake with her friends. Almost immediately, the girl begins to be haunted by creepy visions, and soon the others notice that something strange is happening. A local legend says that the lake can drive some people mad.

== Reception ==
Brian Tallerico of Rogerebert.com gave the film two stars out of four, stating, "“Lake of Death” is a slow burn that fizzles out under the weight of its influences. The tech elements are significantly better than average B-movie fare, but the writing never matches them." Natalia Keogan of Paste wrote, ""From the start, Lake of Death seems more concerned with making quips about horror film plots than constructing one of its own... the film can’t escape the clutches of tired clichés." Michael Phillips of Chicago Tribune commented, "The story holds a strong fascination on Scandinavian culture. As translated to “Lake of Death” and written and directed by director Nini Bull Robsahm, the remake is roughly equal parts psychological and supernatural in its scare tactics — a promising mixture, in other words, soon undercut by grinding repetition."

== Cast ==
- Iben Akerlie as Lillian
- Jakob Schøyen Andersen as Bernhard
- Sophia Lie as Sonja
- Elias Munk as Harald
- Jonathan Harboe as Gabriel
- Ulric von der Esch as Kai
- Patrick Walshe McBride as Bjørn
