= Mortal (film) =

2020 film by André Øvredal

- American release poster
- Norwegian: Torden
- Directed by: André Øvredal
- Screenplay by: André Øvredal; Norman Lesperance; Geoff Bussetil
- Story by: André Øvredal
- Produced by: John Einar; Hagen Ben Pugh; Rory Aitken; Brian Kavanaugh-Jones
- Starring: Nat Wolff; Iben Akerlie; Per Frisch; Per Egil Aske; Priyanka Bose
- Cinematography: Roman Osin
- Edited by: Patrick Laarsgard
- Music by: Marcus Paus
- Production companies: Nordisk Film Production; 42; Automatik Entertainment; Umedia; Zefyr Media Fund; Eldorado Film
- Distributed by: Nordisk Films (Norway); Signature Entertainment (United Kingdom); Saban Films (through Lionsgate Home Entertainment; United States)
- Release dates: 28 February 2020 (Norway); 20 August 2020 (United Kingdom); 10 November 2020 (United States)
- Running time: 104 minutes
- Countries: Norway; United Kingdom; United States
- Languages: English; Norwegian
- Budget: €6.1 million (≃$7.4 million)
- Box office: $126,068

Mortal (Norwegian: Torden) is a 2020 fantasy action film co-written and directed by André Øvredal. The film is inspired by Norse mythology, and stars Nat Wolff. It is supported by a grant from the Government of Norway. The film's dialogue is in English and Norwegian, and most of the actors are Norwegian with the exception of Wolff and Priyanka Bose. The film's original music by Marcus Paus was nominated for the Amanda Award and was the Norwegian nominee for the Nordic Film Music Days – HARPA Award.

Mortal was released in Norway on 28 February 2020, by Nordisk Films, in the United Kingdom on 20 August, by Signature Entertainment, and in the United States on 10 November, by Saban Films. It received mixed reviews from critics.

== Plot ==
Somewhere in the Norwegian wilderness Eric (Nat Wolff) awakes from a nightmare that causes the trees outside his tent to burn to cinders.

He finds that his leg has terrible burns so he heads into town where he breaks into a clinic for bandages. After treating his wounds in a gas station bathroom, he begins walking down the road, presumably back to his campsite. While walking down the road, a group of teens stops to harass Eric. One of the boys, Ole, begins pushing him around. Eric warns him, saying "if you touch me, you will burn." The boy grabs Eric by the collar, then collapses dead. Eric is later picked up at a bus stop by local police.

Christine (Iben Akerlie), a young psychologist, is asked by the local police to speak with Eric, where she learns he is an American-Norwegian who is also a suspect in an unsolved fire that took the lives of five people three years ago. Since the fire, Eric has been backpacking looking for family. She convinces him to sit at the table and confirms he has many generations of Norwegian ancestry. Christine decides to have his handcuffs removed for comfort and trust, Christine also confirms that everyone in the fire were relatives of Eric. Eric admits to killing his relatives and Ole, and as he speaks Christine's hair starts to become statically charged and Eric pulls water up from her glass. He becomes agitated and his powers unleash, which causes the building to start electrical fires; Christine determines his emotions control his powers and quickly counsels him on how to focus to control his power.

The U.S. Embassy arrives to take Eric to America, but he refuses to speak to anyone other than Christine and demands they sedate him to fly in a helicopter. The sedative quickly wears off and mid-flight he starts to panic from being tied up. A thunderstorm causes the helicopter to crash into the sea, where Eric realizes that he can breathe in the water and burns his restraints away. He is able to save one American agent, Hathaway, and drags her to shore.

Eric finds Christine and she takes him to her friend's cabin, where Eric explains that the fire was caused by him bursting into flames. He finally rests and Christine notices the plants are growing rapidly around him. Back at the hospital the American agent confirms with local police that he controls weather.

Christine decides they need to head to the farm. After crashing, a trucker gives them a ride until they reach Hardanger Bridge where the police have set up a roadblock. In the middle of the bridge Eric submits and Christine is captured, but he draws upon the lightning, losing control. Christine coaches Eric to control his emotions and Eric uses the lightning to create a fence until he collapses and the storm subsides. The sheriff comes to their aid and rushes them both to the hospital. On the radio, the group hears social media is claiming he is the Norse god, Thor. At the hospital Eric's powers cause a malfunction of equipment and a boy goes into cardiac arrest. Eric revives the boy, healing him completely.

The sheriff explains after Ragnarök Thor's children built a farm which they believe to be the farm Eric's family is from. At the farm Eric is brought to his knees and unable to move while standing over a type of Vegvísir. The US officer sets up military around the farm ready to kill Eric. The team finds a cave under the farm filled with Norse runestones and a depiction of Yggdrasil. Eric is told it is time for him to go into the cave where he is drawn to a box of stone which contains Thor's glove Járngreipr, his belt Megingjörð, and his hammer Mjölnir. Eric puts on all of this equipment and causes another electrical storm, which is controlled by the hammer. Once Eric leaves the cave, Christine approaches him, and Hathaway gives the order to fire on him. A sniper hits Christine by mistake, killing her. Enraged, Eric uses the hammer to summon a massive lightning storm that engulfs the area, causing a large number of casualties.

The film ends with a news cast stating that, after the incident, a cult of Thor has emerged. Eric is at large, wanted as a terrorist.

== Cast ==
- Nat Wolff as Eric
- Iben Akerlie as Christine
- Per Frisch as Henrik
- Per Egil Aske as Bjørn
- Priyanka Bose as Hathaway

== Soundtrack ==
The film's original music by Marcus Paus was nominated for the Amanda Award and as the Norwegian nominee for the Nordic Film Music Days – HARPA Award. In a review of Paus' film score, Jonathan Broxton wrote that the work is "likely to be remembered as the breakthrough of a superb ‘new’ talent because if this is any indication of his work, he’s going to be massive very soon." Daniel Schweiger described Mortal as "truly thunderstruck in announcing Paus’ symphonically avenging talent to a bigger playing field."

== Release ==
Mortal was theatrically released by Nordisk Films on 28 February 2020 in Norway, digitally by Signature Entertainment on 20 August in the United Kingdom, and on VOD by Saban Films via Lionsgate Home Entertainment on 10 November in the United States.

== Reception ==
=== Box office ===
Mortal grossed $126,068 worldwide, against a production budget of about $7.4 million, plus $2,316 with home video sales.

=== Critical response ===
On review aggregator Rotten Tomatoes, the film holds a 56% approval rating based on 34 reviews, with an average of 5.7/10. On Metacritic, the film holds a rating of 20 out of 100, based on 5 critics, indicating "generally unfavorable reviews".
