= Throwbacks (album) =

Soundtrack album by Nat and Alex Wolff
- Released: October 15, 2013
- Recorded: March – June 2008
- Genre: Pop rock, soundtrack
- Length: 43:46
- Label: Nick/Columbia
- Producer: Michael Wolff and Michael A. Levine

Nat and Alex Wolff chronology
Black Sheep (2011)	Throwbacks (2013)	Public Places (2016)

Throwbacks is the final album recorded by Nat and Alex Wolff under the name "The Naked Brothers Band" and the soundtrack to the third and final season of the show of the same name. Under the working title "Songs of Season 3," due to post-production problems, it was originally cancelled, until it was announced on September 19, 2013 to be released as a Nat & Alex Wolff album instead of a Naked Brothers Band album on October 15, 2013, under the title Throwbacks. One song that was recorded for the intended season 3 soundtrack, "Face in the Hall", which later appeared in the iCarly soundtrack, was not included on the album.

== Background ==
=== Writing ===
The song "Yes We Can", which features Natasha Bedingfield and Leon Thomas III, was inspired by the presidency of Barack Obama.

=== Recording ===
Recording for the album took place in the Summer of 2008 in New York.

== Track listing ==
All tracks are written by Nat Wolff, except "All I Needed", "Blueberry Cotton" and "Jesse" by Alex Wolff.

No.	Title	Length
1.	"Curious" (from "Operation Mojo")	3:32
2.	"Just a Girl I Know" (from "The Premiere")	2:44
3.	"All I Needed" (from "No Schools Fools Day")	3:26
4.	"I Feel Alone" (from "Operation Mojo")	3:21
5.	"Yes We Can (feat. Natasha Bedingfield and Leon Thomas III)" (from "Christmas Special")	4:13
6.	"Blueberry Cotton" (from "Mystery Girl")	3:39
7.	"Little Old Nita" (from "Supetastic 6")	2:59
8.	"Your Smile" (from "Mystery Girl")	3:32
9.	"The World (As We Know It Today)" (from "Naked Idol")	3:39
10.	"Jesse" (from "Valentine Dream Date")	3:06
11.	"No Night Is Perfect" (from "Valentine Dream Date")	3:46
12.	"Scary World" (from "Mystery Girl")	2:01
13.	"Fire" (from "The Premiere")	4:06
