= Mr. Troop Mom =

2009 American TV comedy television film

- DVD cover
- Written by: Thomas Ian Griffith
- Directed by: William Dear
- Starring: George Lopez; Daniela Bobadilla; April Telek; Jessica McLeod; Jane Lynch
- Music by: David Kitay
- Country of origin: United States
- Original language: English

Production
- Producer: Frank Pace
- Cinematography: Ron Stannett
- Editor: Chris Conlee
- Running time: 84 minutes
- Production company: Warner Premiere

Original release
- Network: Nickelodeon
- Release: June 19, 2009

Mr. Troop Mom is an American 2009 comedy television film directed by William Dear, written by Thomas Ian Griffith and starring George Lopez, Daniela Bobadilla, April Telek, Julia Anderson, Elizabeth Thai, Geoff Gustafson, and Jane Lynch. It tells of Eddie Serrano (Lopez), a widower, and his teenage daughter Naomi. Eddie joins Naomi and her friends on a camping trip, making Eddie the "Team Mom".

The film aired on Nickelodeon and premiered on June 19, 2009; it was released on DVD and Blu-ray on June 23, 2009.

== Plot ==
Eddie Serrano (George Lopez) is a widower with a teenage daughter Naomi (Daniela Bobadilla). A classic workaholic, Eddie has not been there for most of Naomi's big moments, though not from lack of trying. Naomi doesn't appreciate it and is always upset because her father embarrasses Naomi in front of her friends. (for example when in the beginning of the film, he shouted out to Naomi, "Have a good day baby, I love you snuggle bear.") Initially, Eddie never expected the original "Team Mom" would go into labor so early.

Subsequently, Eddie substitutes her place for being "Team Mom" for the "Killer Bees", which is Naomi's team in the Spring Action Classic at Camp Hulka's Rock, an all-girls summer camp. His business sort-of way of doing things doesn't qualify the standards for his job as the leader for her daughter's team or even taking care of girls in general, which doesn't please the camp's director Ms. Hulka (Jane Lynch). Eventually, Eddie begins to learn how to lighten up and go with the flow a little bit more that helps him succeed not only with his daughter, but also the standards he needs to do to be part of the team.

One day, Eddie catches Naomi's rival reading Naomi's journal to her friends and mocking her father. After recovering the journal, Eddie reads some of it and comes to realize how absent he has been in Naomi's life. To show that he can have fun, he wakes up the Killer Bees at night and they sneak into the pantry to have an ice cream party. However, Eddie accidentally reveals that he read Naomi's journal and she angrily storms off. Calling in some favors from home, Eddie and his friends help Naomi get back at her rival, who reveals that she had only bullied Naomi because she had a father whereas she only has a single mother that raised her to be a winner. They finish their race together and share the victory.

At the end, The Naked Brothers Band perform a concert with their song "If You Can Make It Through The Rain" thanks to a favor from one of Eddie's clients, followed by a fireworks display.

== Cast ==
- George Lopez as Eddie Serrano, a widower and public defender. He is always there for his daughter, but always embarrasses her in front of her peers.
- Daniela Bobadilla as Naomi Serrano, a 13-year-old girl and Eddie's daughter. She is not accepting of what her father has done for her, and therefore, doesn't have a good relationship with her dad, and doesn't notice that he does his very best to get closer with her.
- Jane Lynch as Ms. Hulka
- Julia Anderson as C.C. Turner
- Laine MacNeil as Kayla
- April Telek as Denise
- Elizabeth Thai as Catalina
- Geoff Gustafson as Harry
- Jessica McLeod as Paulina
- Pyper de Marsh as Sam
- Jianna Ballard as Skyler
- Mayan Lopez as Yvette

The film features a cameo appearance by the musical duo, Nat & Alex Wolff, who portrayed themselves.

== Reception ==
Though most of the reviews from the critics were mixed, with a critic citing it as "utterly and completely predictable - and charming", the television movie fared well in the ratings, garnering 4 million total viewers on its first airing, and was the number one original basic cable program that night.
