= Alex Wolff =

American actor and musician (born 1997)

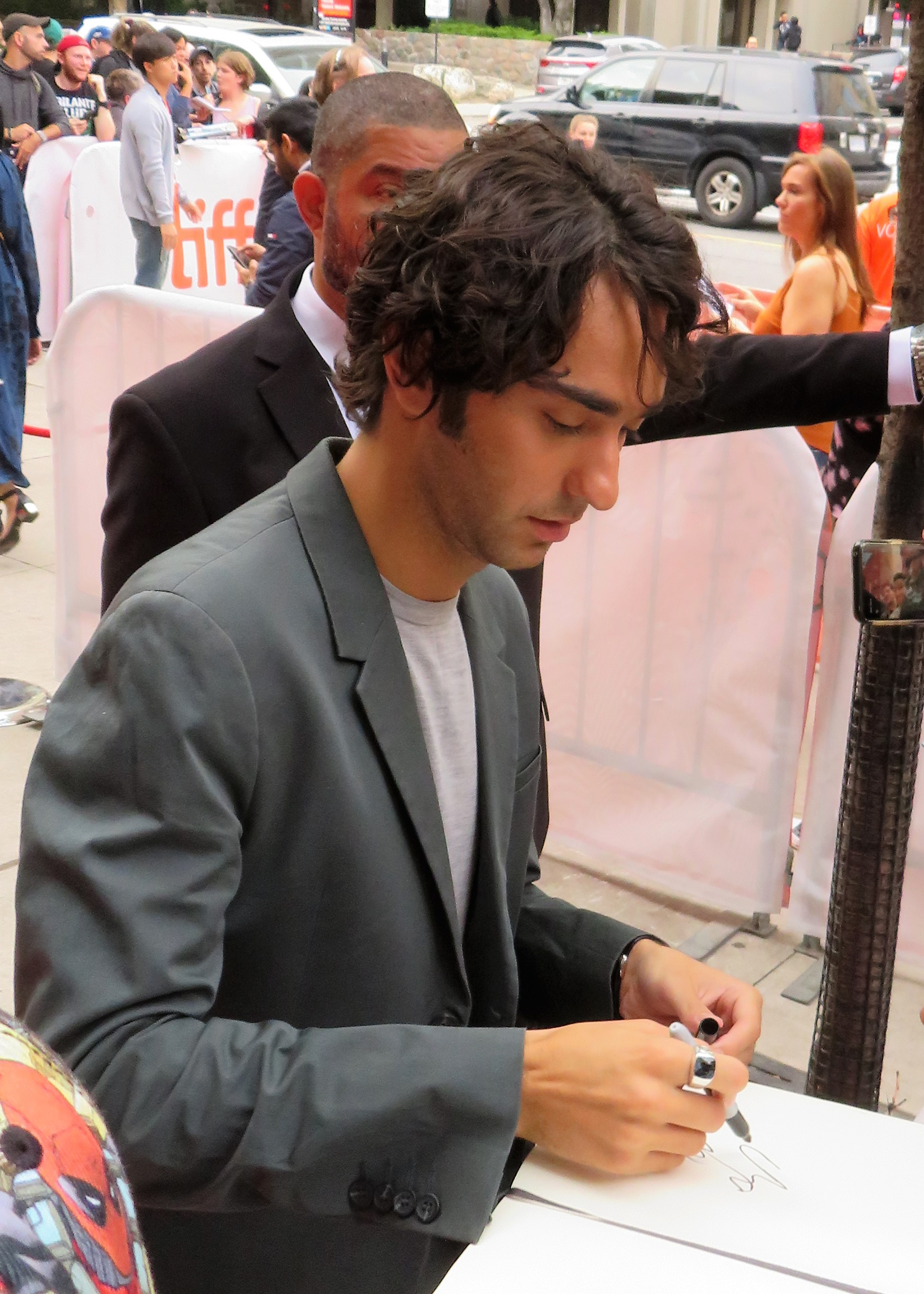
- Wolff in 2019
- Born: Alexander Draper Wolff; November 1, 1997 (age 29); New York City, U.S.
- Occupations: Actor; musician
- Years active: 2005–present
- Parents: Michael Wolff; Polly Draper
- Relatives: Nat Wolff (brother); William Henry Draper Jr. (great-grandfather); William Henry Draper III (grandfather); Tim Draper (uncle); Jesse Draper (cousin)
- Musical career
- Genres: Pop; rock; indie; bubblegum pop
- Instruments: Vocals; drums; guitar; keyboards
- Labels: Columbia; Nick; Sony BMG; SaddleUp; RED
- Member of: Nat & Alex Wolff
- Formerly of: The Naked Brothers Band

Alexander Draper Wolff (born November 1, 1997) is an American actor, musician, and singer-songwriter. He first gained recognition for starring alongside his older brother, Nat, in the Nickelodeon musical comedy series The Naked Brothers Band (2007–2009) that was created by his mother, Polly Draper. Wolff's father, Michael Wolff, co-produced the series' soundtrack albums The Naked Brothers Band (2007) and I Don't Want to Go to School (2008), both of which were placed on the Billboard 200 charts.

After the Nickelodeon series ended, Wolff and his brother formed a music duo called Nat & Alex Wolff, and they released the albums Black Sheep (2011), Public Places (2016) and Table for Two (2023). He focused his career on film roles, portraying Dzhokhar Tsarnaev in Patriots Day (2016) and John "Derf" Backderf in My Friend Dahmer (2017). Wolff made his directorial debut with the drama film The Cat and the Moon (2019). His other acting roles include My Big Fat Greek Wedding 2 (2016), Jumanji: Welcome to the Jungle (2017), Hereditary (2018), Pig (2021), Old (2021), and A Quiet Place: Day One (2024).

== Early life ==
Wolff was born on November 1, 1997, in Manhattan, New York, to actress and filmmaker Polly Draper and jazz musician Michael Wolff. He is the younger brother of actor and musician Nat Wolff. His father is Jewish and mother is Christian. Wolff is a cousin to actress and venture capitalist Jesse Draper, nephew of venture capitalist Tim Draper, maternal grandson to venture capitalist and civic leader William Henry Draper III, and great-grandson of banker and diplomat William Henry Draper Jr.

Wolff has Tourette's syndrome that he inherited from his father.

When he and his older brother were toddlers, they climbed out of the bathtub and called themselves "the naked brothers band", which inspired the name of the subsequent Nickelodeon TV series. As a young child, Wolff taught himself how to play the saxophone, as well as drums by viewing footage of Ringo Starr.

Although the Nickelodeon TV show The Naked Brothers Band remained successful over three seasons, his parents decided to cancel the series in 2009.

It was a confusing thing, it wasn't really canceled. They wanted us to do a couple movies for them, but we didn't really want to do that," Wolff explains. "Or, they wanted us to do 60 episodes during the school year, but my parents wanted us to go to school, so we couldn't do that. They didn't want to keep doing what we were doing." - Nat Wolff

From the beginning, their parents were hesitant to expose him and his brother to stardom at a young age and later agreed to the series spin-off on the provision that filming would take place only during the summer and early fall, which allowed him and his brother to proceed with their enrollment at private school in New York City.

== Career ==
Wolff began his acting career at the age of 6 in the musical comedy film The Naked Brothers Band: The Movie that was written and directed by his mother and screened at the Hamptons International Film Festival in 2005.

It was not until he was 9 years old that he gained fame after the film was commissioned by a former Nickelodeon executive as the pilot to the television series The Naked Brothers Band (2007–2009), which was also created, showran, written, and directed by his mother. He contributed lyrics, vocals, and instrumentation for both the film and series; their father produced and supervised the music. The show released two soundtrack albums that were placed on the Billboard 200 charts and the song "Crazy Car" ranked #83 on the Billboard Hot 100 charts.

In 2007, Wolff portrayed the young boy in the Fall Out Boy music video "The Take Over, the Breaks Over". He made a cameo in the Nickelodeon TV movie Mr. Troop Mom and the USA police-procedural, comedic television drama Monk, both in 2009. He also wrote and starred in the play What Would Woody Do? at The Flea Theater—which was directed by his mother—and the HBO medical drama In Treatment, both in 2010. Wolff later appeared in the comedy film The Sitter (2011) and starred alongside Brendan Fraser in the independent film HairBrained (2012).

In 2015, Wolff starred in the indie drama Coming Through the Rye. In 2016, he had a supporting role in the comedy sequel My Big Fat Greek Wedding 2 and played terrorist Dzhokhar Tsarnaev in the drama Patriots Day, about the Boston Marathon bombing.

In 2018, he starred as Peter in the supernatural horror film Hereditary. He made his directorial debut with The Cat and the Moon (2019), which he also wrote and starred in.

In 2020, Wolff participated in Acting for a Cause, a live classic play and screenplay reading series, created, directed and produced by Brando Crawford. Wolff played Algernon in The Importance of Being Earnest by Oscar Wilde and Warren Straub in This Is Our Youth by Kenneth Lonergan. The reading raised funds for non-profit charities including Mount Sinai Medical Center. Wolff co-produced the second reading.

Since 2024, he and his brother are touring with Grammy Award-winning singer-songwriter and musician Billie Eilish as the opening act for her concerts across the United States.

== Awards ==
For Wolff's work on The Naked Brothers Band series and film, he obtained the Audience Award for a Family Feature Film at the Hamptons International Film Festival in 2005, a Broadcast Music, Inc. Cable Award in 2007, and was nominated for a Young Artist Award both in 2008 and 2009. He also received a Certificate of Outstanding Achievement for Best Actor at the Brooklyn International Film Festival for his lead role in the film HairBrained in 2013. On October 11, 2018, Wolff received the Auteur Award at the San Diego International Film Festival.

He received a Canadian Screen Award nomination for Best Actor at the 9th Canadian Screen Awards in 2021, for his performance in the film Castle in the Ground.

== Filmography ==
=== Film ===
Year	Title	Role	Notes
2005	The Naked Brothers Band: The Movie	Alex Wolff	
2011	From Up on Poppy Hill	Riku Matsuzaki (voice)	English dub
2011	The Sitter	Clayton	
2012	The Empty Room	Allen	Short film
2013	A Birder's Guide to Everything	Timmy Barsky	
2013	Hair Brained	Eli Pettifog	
2015	Coming Through the Rye	Jamie Schwartz	
2015	Boots	Noah	Short film
2016	My Big Fat Greek Wedding 2	Bennett	
2016	The Standoff	Zane	
2016	Patriots Day	Dzhokhar Tsarnaev	
2017	Thoroughbreds	Party Friend	Uncredited
2017	The House of Tomorrow	Jared Whitcomb	
2017	My Friend Dahmer	John 'Derf' Backderf	
2017	Jumanji: Welcome to the Jungle	Spencer Gilpin	
2018	Hereditary	Peter Graham	
2018	Dude	Noah	
2018	Stella's Last Weekend	Oliver	
2019	The Cat and the Moon	Nick	Also writer and director
2019	Castle in the Ground	Henry Fine	
2019	Bad Education	Nick Fleishman	
2019	Human Capital	Ian	
2019	Jumanji: The Next Level	Spencer Gilpin	
2021	Pig	Amir	
2021	Old	Trent Cappa (age 15)	
2021	O Night Divine	Hugo	Short film
2022	Susie Searches	Jesse	
2023	A Good Person	Mark	
2023	The Line	Tom Backster	
2023	Oppenheimer	Luis Walter Alvarez	
2024	A Quiet Place: Day One	Reuben	
2025	Magic Farm	Jeff	
2026	Jumanji: Open World	Spencer Gilpin	Post-production
2027	Outside of Cleveland	Max	Post-production
2027	A Quiet Place Part III	Reuben	Filming

=== Television ===
Year	Title	Role	Notes
2007–2009	The Naked Brothers Band	Alex Wolff	Main cast
2009	Mr. Troop Mom	Alex Wolff	Television film
2009	Monk	Brian Willis	Episode: "Mr. Monk Goes Camping"
2010	In Treatment	Max Weston	7 episodes
2016	Divorce	Cole	2 episodes
2017	Red Oaks	Director	Episode: "Summer in the City"
2017	Crash & Burn	Gabriel	Television film
2020	Acting for a Cause	Algernon / Warren Straub	2 episodes
2024	So Long, Marianne	Leonard Cohen	
2025	It's Always Sunny in Philadelphia	Simon	Episode: "Frank Is in a Coma"

=== Music videos ===
Year	Song	Artist	Role
2024	"Lithonia"	Childish Gambino	Drummer
