= The Arsenio Hall Show =

American late-night talk show (1989–1994; 2013–2014)

- Genre: Variety, talk show
- Created by: Arsenio Hall; Marla Kell Brown
- Starring: Arsenio Hall
- Announcer: Burton Richardson; Diana Steele
- Music by: Michael Wolff and the Posse
- Opening theme: composed by Arsenio Hall
- Country of origin: United States
- Original language: English
- No. of seasons: 7
- No. of episodes: 1,525

Production
- Executive producers: Arsenio Hall; John Ferriter; Neal Kendall
- Production locations: Paramount Studios Hollywood, California (1989–94); Sunset Bronson Studios Hollywood, California (2013–14)
- Camera setup: Multi-camera
- Running time: 60 minutes
- Production companies: Arsenio Hall Communications (1989–2014); Paramount Domestic Television (1989–94); Eye Productions Inc. (2013–14); Octagon Entertainment Productions (2013–14); Tribune Broadcasting (2013–14); CBS Television Distribution (2013–14)

Original release
- Network: Syndication
- Release: January 3, 1989 – May 27, 1994
- Release: September 9, 2013 – May 21, 2014

Related
- The Late Show (Fox)

The Arsenio Hall Show is an American syndicated late-night talk show created by and starring comedian Arsenio Hall.

There have been two different incarnations of The Arsenio Hall Show. The original series premiered on January 3, 1989, and ran until May 27, 1994. Nineteen years after the original series ended, Hall returned for a revival. It premiered on September 9, 2013, and was cancelled after one season, with the finale airing on May 21, 2014.

Both series were produced by Hall's production company, Arsenio Hall Communications. The original series was produced and distributed by Paramount Domestic Television and taped at Stage 29 at Paramount Studios in Los Angeles. The second series was shot at Sunset Bronson Studios in Hollywood, and it was produced by Tribune Broadcasting, Octagon Entertainment and Eye Productions. It was distributed by CBS Television Distribution.

== First series (1989–94) ==
=== Background ===
Hall had been a host on The Late Show in 1987, another talk show on Fox, after the dismissal of Joan Rivers. He was given a 13-week run, during which he became unexpectedly popular. During the monologue of his final appearance as host, Hall stated that he agreed to only do 13 weeks because he could only stay that long as he had plans "to do other things". He subsequently began working on the Eddie Murphy vehicle Coming to America. He ultimately signed with Paramount Television before Fox finally decided, after the fact, that it wanted to keep him. Hall had a fairly long connection with Paramount before this, having been the in-house comedian on Paramount's weekly music series Solid Gold for several years and co-hosting its final two years.

Arsenio, debuting on Tuesday, Jan. 3, 1989, with guests Brooke Shields, Leslie Nielsen and Luther Vandross, was one of two late-night shows to premiere that month. The other was The Pat Sajak Show on CBS, hosted by longtime Wheel of Fortune host Pat Sajak. Unlike Sajak, Hall benefited from prior experience hosting a late-night program, especially when compared with Sajak's lack of emceeing experience outside of his Wheel duties. Hall also had a clear demographic to serve (whereas Sajak was targeting the already-taken demographic that was watching The Tonight Show Starring Johnny Carson), and his show premiered the week before Sajak's, giving him a head start. While Hall's show became a near-instant hit, Sajak's show was a ratings flop and was canceled after little more than a year.

=== Recurring features and gags ===
Burton Richardson's long intro of the show's host (in which he held the letter O in "Arsenio" for as long as ten seconds just before Hall came out on stage, and then in the same breath, immediately announced "HALL!") is a staple of the show. In the intro to the final episode, Richardson held his one-breath introduction for exactly twenty seconds, one of the few times he had done so. While being introduced (and as seen on show titles and promos), Arsenio stood with his head down, hands together and legs apart, in the shape of the letter "A".

One of the show's recurrent themes was affixing a humorous label to a section of the studio audience in rows behind/near the band, called the "Dog Pound", based on the Dawg Pound fan section of Cleveland Stadium and later FirstEnergy Stadium of the Cleveland Browns National Football League team. Members of the original band called "the Posse" included John B. Williams, Starr Parodi, Peter Maunu, Terri Lyne Carrington (later replaced by Chuck Morris) who were led by jazz pianist Michael Wolff, jubilantly interacted with Hall, standing up and making a pumping, whirling motion with their raised fists and howling "Woof, woof, woof". The labeling was a staple of Hall's opening monologue and almost always began with the phrase "Those are people who...." In one variation of Hall ridiculing the "Dog Pound", Hall designated the section as "People who are currently in a Witness Protection Program", at which point a camera pans over to that section to reveal a digitally pixelized view of the audience that made it impossible to identify them.

A frequent joke in Hall's opening monologue suggested that he still lives in Cleveland and drives to Los Angeles every day to host the show. While on these alleged long drives, Hall ponders certain thoughts, referring to them as "things that make you go hmmm...." The running gag inspired a 1991 C+C Music Factory song by the same title. "Things That Make You Go Hmmm..." reached No. 1 on the Billboard Dance Club Songs chart and No. 4 on the Billboard Hot 100 chart.

=== Cultural influence, increasing viewership and profits ===
The Arsenio Hall Show, which premiered on 135 stations nationwide, was aimed primarily at, although not limited to, the younger urban audience. Eddie Murphy (a personal friend of Hall's), George Lopez and other performers were often featured, such as semi-regular guests including Andrew Dice Clay and Paula Abdul. The show quickly appealed to young people of all races and began to attract a wide variety of guests not common on other talk shows. It became the show for entertainers to go to in order to reach the "MTV Generation". The show was commonly dubbed a "Night Thing" and reflected a party or nightclub theme.

Hall's friend M.C. Hammer was also a frequent interview and musical guest. Additionally, Hall interviewed "Jason Voorhees", the main character from the popular Friday the 13th series of films around the time of the release of Friday the 13th Part VIII: Jason Takes Manhattan. Muppets creator Jim Henson also appeared on the show 12 days before his death in May 1990, marking one of Henson's last public appearances. Hall often featured World Wrestling Federation wrestlers, like Hulk Hogan (who first denied using steroids on the program), "Ravishing" Rick Rude (who made a special set of tights with Hall's face on the back) with Bobby Heenan, Randy Savage, Roddy Piper, Bad News Brown, the Big Bossman, and Akeem with Slick and The Ultimate Warrior.

Hall was also well known for his long fingers, which he would often use to point at the audience. Michael Wolff led the house band, which Hall called "Posse".

With the steadily increasing viewership of The Arsenio Hall Show throughout the 1990-91 television season, the show had reportedly begun making about US$1.2 million in profits per week for its syndicator Paramount—adding up to US$62.4 million for the year, more money than the company made from its most popular prime-time TV series at the time, Cheers, and more than most of its movies generated.

=== Queer Nation incident ===
During a December 14, 1990 taping, four members of Queer Nation, seated in the back row in different sections of the audience, interrupted Hall's opening monologue demanding to know why he never had any gay guests on the show. Hall's initial answer was that since most of the guests were not open about their sexuality, neither Hall nor the producers knew whether they were gay or not.

When the protesters voiced their offense because the show failed to book filmmaker Gus Van Sant (whose My Own Private Idaho was in production at the time) or actor Harvey Fierstein, Hall defended the show by saying that Elton John had been a guest. Increasingly infuriated, Hall added that he booked guests due to his interest in what they were working on at the time, not because of their sexual preference. (Specifically, in the case of Fierstein, saying that if he was doing something that Hall found interesting, he would book him as a guest.) The heated exchange went on for several minutes, and Hall continued to defend himself as both a comedian and a host, pointing out that he also had gay friends, and that a person's sexual preference was really nobody else's business. Fierstein eventually did become a guest on the show months later.

=== Bill Clinton ===
In June 1992, then-presidential candidate Bill Clinton (who was a fan of the show) was a guest on the show, playing "Heartbreak Hotel" on the saxophone (causing Arsenio to quip, "It's nice to see a Democrat blow something besides the election"). The appearance is often considered an important moment in Clinton's political career, helping build his popularity among minority and young voters. Clinton went on to win the election in November 1992.

=== Displacement by new network shows, ratings decline and cancellation ===
The program remained popular into 1993, airing on 178 stations throughout America. As the year went on, the ratings declined due in large part to the premiere of three late-night series before the year was out.

At the end of the 1992–93 season one of Hall's strongest bases consisted of CBS affiliates. At the time, and ever since the 1972 cancellation of The Merv Griffin Show, CBS did not offer much in the way of late night programming other than its nightly crime drama rerun block and its overnight newscast CBS News Nightwatch (later replaced by Up to the Minute), and had not offered a late-night variety program since The Pat Sajak Show was cancelled in 1990. Among the reported 44 CBS stations that aired Arsenio at the time included WBBM-TV in Chicago (one of the network's owned-and-operated stations), WUSA in Washington, D.C., WAGA-TV in Atlanta, WJBK-TV in Detroit and WJW-TV in Hall's hometown of Cleveland (the latter three of which were owned at the time by businessman George Gillett via his then-recent acquisition of Storer Communications; all three are now affiliates of Fox after a high-profile affiliation switch). Some of these stations picked up Hall's show to fill the void left by Sajak's cancellation, while many others had chosen to carry Hall's program in lieu of Sajak's. Another prominent group of stations that carried the program were affiliates of the still-young Fox, many of which picked up Arsenio to fill the gaps left when The Late Show, which never was able to find an audience, was finally canceled in 1988. This group, numbering 72 stations total, included WTXF-TV in Philadelphia, a station that Paramount acquired in 1991.

In the summer of 1993, David Letterman, who had spent over 13 years at NBC and the previous 11 as the host of the popular Late Night, which followed The Tonight Show at 12:30, left the network due to his dissatisfaction with being passed over as host of The Tonight Show after the retirement of Johnny Carson in favor of Jay Leno. Letterman signed with CBS to do a late-night program which would compete head-to-head with The Tonight Show, and which would also compete with Hall's program. Unlike the situation that prevailed when he was competing against Sajak, Hall was now up against one of the most popular hosts in late night television. Several CBS stations, including WBBM-TV, dropped Hall's show when Late Show with David Letterman debuted in August or pushed it back further in the night. Most of the rest dropped Hall when Letterman's show became a runaway hit, even surpassing The Tonight Show in the Nielsen ratings. WUSA was one of the exceptions, having rebuffed an edict by CBS for all of its affiliates to clear the Late Show at the normal network time for their respective time zones, while in Milwaukee, Arsenio was paired back-to-back by Fox affiliate WCGV-TV with the Late Show, which was refused clearance by then-CBS affiliate WITI (also co-owned with the aforementioned Storer stations that were becoming part of New World Communications at the time; now a Fox O&O) in favor of syndicated sitcoms. Then-CBS affiliate WBAL-TV in Baltimore also retained the show when The Late Show started, instead being cleared by then-independent WNUV. Arsenio also found itself losing some of its audience to cable, as MTV launched the daily thirty-minute program The Jon Stewart Show, which became popular in its own right.

Subsequently, Fox decided to get back into the late-night television battle after several years, despite Arsenio drawing solid ratings on many of its affiliates. In September 1993, the network premiered The Chevy Chase Show running directly against Hall, Leno and Letterman. Despite Arsenio performing well on many Fox affiliates against his network competitors and ABC's Nightline (as well as local newscasts), Fox demanded that all of its affiliates air Chase's show at its network-approved 11:00 p.m. ET timeslot, leading the Fox stations airing Arsenio to either drop the series or relocate it to a less desirable time slot. Although The Chevy Chase Show was a critical and ratings flop and left the air after only five weeks (being replaced by reruns of In Living Color and other Fox programs), the damage was done. Stations that Arsenio had been or was still airing on were not inclined to move it back, which caused more of a dip in the ratings as many of the high-profile guests drawn to Arsenio, some of whom rarely if at all appeared on The Tonight Show when Carson was hosting, gravitated increasingly towards Leno and Letterman.

On February 7, 1994, Hall announced that he would be featuring controversial Nation of Islam leader Louis Farrakhan. He had also booked gospel singer Kirk Franklin and his singing group The Family for the show as well and promised that he would give them both equal time on the show, which was to air eighteen days following the announcement, as he had drawn criticism for even considering booking Farrakhan as a guest. Instead, nearly the entire show was devoted to Hall interviewing Farrakhan and he received widespread criticism for conducting what was considered too "soft" of an interview. This resulted in a further ratings slide during the fifth season, with the Los Angeles Times citing a 24% drop from 1992–93 to 1993–94.

Although Paramount did say publicly that the show was not in imminent danger of cancellation, Hall announced on April 18, 1994, that he was not going to continue the show, simply saying "it's time". The final episode aired on May 27, 1994.

=== Aftermath ===
Shortly before The Arsenio Hall Show was canceled, Paramount's merger with Viacom was finalized. Since this now meant that Paramount and MTV were corporate siblings, there was a ready-made replacement for Arsenio and after a retooling and expansion, a syndicated version of The Jon Stewart Show was launched in late 1994. Despite being sold to most of the same Arsenio affiliates, The Jon Stewart Show was never able to find an audience in syndication as it had on MTV and the show was canceled after its lone season as a syndicated series.

After the decline of Arsenio and the failure of The Jon Stewart Show, Paramount did not make another attempt at producing a late-night variety show. Nonetheless, they were not willing to give up on the idea fully and in 1998, Paramount developed a daytime variety show for comedian Howie Mandel. The Howie Mandel Show premiered in May 1998, but could not find an audience in what was then a syndicated landscape saturated with talk shows, and Paramount canceled the show in early 1999. Paramount subsequently gave up on the variety format altogether and did not attempt it again before its television operations were folded into those of CBS.

In the 2000s, VH1 aired a repacked version of the show called Arsenio Jams featuring musical performances and select interviews from the show's first run.

== Second series (2013–14) ==
In May 2012, Hall was said to be shopping around an idea for a new late-night program and had garnered interest from Fox and TBS as to picking the show up. On June 18, 2012, Hall announced that he had brokered a deal with CBS Television Distribution and Tribune Broadcasting to bring his late-night talk show back to television. Although the show was agreed upon in time for the 2012–13 season, the agreement was to see Arsenio return at the beginning of the next season.

The revived Arsenio Hall Show debuted on September 9, 2013. Stations that also carried Hall's original program, such as CBS-owned station KBCW in the San Francisco Bay Area and CFMT-DT in Toronto, picked up the revived series as well. Tribune-owned stations airing Arsenio included: KTLA in Los Angeles, KDAF in Dallas-Fort Worth, WPIX in New York City, WGN-TV in Chicago, KCPQ in Seattle and WDCW in Washington, D.C. The show also aired on CBS-owned stations affiliated with either CBS or The CW.

Unlike Hall's previous series, this version was taped at the Sunset Bronson Studios in Hollywood, whose lot houses KTLA. As with the original series, Hall referred to his house band as "The Posse 2.0" which consisted of Robin DiMaggio as the music leader/director and drummer, Alex Al on bass, Rob Bacon on guitar, Sean Holt on saxophone and Victoria Theodore on keyboards. Additionally, Hall's opening monologue still mostly consisted of jokes about current events. Hall ended each show by saying, "I'll see you in 23 (71 on each Friday show) hours."

In another notable difference from Hall's previous show, Diana Steele's intro to the show's host (in which she held the "O" in "Arsenio" for a long as five seconds right before Hall came out onto the stage, and then in the same breath, finally/immediately announced, "HALL!") was also a staple of the show.

In mid-October 2013, executive producer Neal Kendeall stepped down due to creative differences. The senior VP of programming and development, Eric Pankowski, took over while Hall conducted a search for a new show-runner, in an effort to revamp the show and boost ratings. Reruns were aired during the brief transition period until new episodes resumed the week of October 28.

During an interview with Oprah Winfrey that same month, Hall and Winfrey discussed a "feud" between the two based on jokes he told nearly 20 years earlier about her weight and Oprah's partner, Stedman Graham. During their talk on Oprah's Next Chapter, Hall also mentioned his long-time friendship with Jay Leno, how David Letterman was an influence on him and the late-night talk show competition in general, including the 2010 Tonight Show conflict between Leno and Conan O'Brien.

=== Ratings and reception ===
The debut episode beat out all late night shows in viewership that evening. However, after its premiere week in September 2013, the show's record-setting ratings dropped 40% (falling from an average 1.5 rating to 0.4 with 18–49 target audiences). While ratings spiraled downward, show executives were optimistic.

Critical reactions to the updated show were mixed since its premiere week. According to Media Life Magazine, Hall's flashy, edgy and laid-back approach to late-night talk shows in the early 1990s was having little effect on audiences after its reincarnation. The New York Times reported the show had much familiarity and that "Mr. Hall's return to the screen was mostly a little sad. He is better than this and deserved a more convincing comeback." While also reporting Hall's talk show is similar to his original series, Variety gave a better review/reception of the revived show, stating "while he might not be the hippest guy in late-night anymore, Arsenio 2.0 can still emerge as a survivor".

In 2013, The Orange County Register described the original run of show as "energetic, groundbreaking", and a "cultural phenomenon, noting Hall's confident personality, diverse guests and musical acts, and the parodies that have been inspired by the show since it first aired.

=== Cancellation ===
The revived Arsenio program was initially renewed for a second season on February 26, 2014; the announcement was made to that night's audience on air by Jay Leno in his first post–Tonight Show appearance. However, the decision was later reversed, and the program was cancelled by CBS Television Distribution and Tribune, on May 30, 2014.

== Seasons and episodes ==
Season 1 began on January 3, 1989, and ended on August 11, 1989.

Season 2 began on September 11, 1989, and ended on August 24, 1990.

Season 3 began on September 10, 1990, and ended on August 15, 1991.

Season 4 began on September 9, 1991, and ended on August 21, 1992.

Season 5 began on September 8, 1992, and ended on August 20, 1993.

Season 6 began on September 7, 1993, and ended on May 27, 1994.

Season 7 (second series) began on September 9, 2013, and ended on May 21, 2014.

The original series consisted of 1,366 episodes and the revival season consisted of 159 episodes. Throughout the series, there were numerous notable guests and multiple special episodes, including the 1000th show.

Guests appearing included: MC Hammer, Bill Cosby, Barry Manilow, Malcolm-Jamal Warner, Alyssa Milano, Bill Clinton, Spike Lee, Magic Johnson, Sinéad O'Connor, Chance the Rapper, Phil McGraw, Bill Maher, Simon Cowell, Gladys Knight, Paula Abdul, LL Cool J, Prince, Louis Farrakhan, Ice Cube, Luther Vandross, Brooke Shields, Eddie Murphy, Jim Henson, Sylvester Stallone, Joan Rivers, Farrah Fawcett, Phil Donahue, Cheers cast, Carol Burnett, Kirk Cameron, New Edition, John Goodman, Billy Crystal, Michael J. Fox, Jerry Seinfeld, Smokey Robinson, Ed McMahon, Madonna, Huey Lewis and the News, Elton John, Marky Mark and the Funky Bunch, Roseanne Arnold, Vanilla Ice, Rick Ross, Ray Romano, Betty White, Sinbad, Billy Bob Thornton, Ziggy Marley, Paul Mooney, Earth, Wind & Fire, T. D. Jakes, Nicolas Cage, Raven-Symoné, Robin Williams, Toad the Wet Sprocket, Sir Mix-a-Lot, Chris Tucker, "Weird Al" Yankovic, Jaleel White, Snoop Dogg, Dr. Dre, Boyz II Men, Sally Jessy Raphael, Tom Arnold, Lionel Richie, Marlon Wayans, Martina McBride, El DeBarge, Hulk Hogan, Patti LaBelle, George Lopez, Wayne Brady, Nick Cannon, Tracy Morgan and many others.

== Awards ==
Emmy Awards

- 1989: "Outstanding Variety, Music or Comedy Program" — nominated
- 1990: "Outstanding Variety, Music or Comedy Series" — nominated
- 1990: "Outstanding Sound Mixing for a Variety or Music Series or a Special" — winner
- 1993: "Outstanding Technical Direction/Camera/Video for a Series", for episode "The 1000th show" — winner

NAACP Image Awards

- 1993: "Outstanding Variety Series/Special" — winner
- 1995: "Outstanding Variety Series" — winner
- 2014: "Outstanding Talk Series" — nominated

People's Choice Awards

- 1990: "Favorite Late Night Talk Show Host" — winner

== Spin-off ==
In 1990, Hall decided to develop a companion program to his own as what he termed to be his show's "afterparty". This idea became The Party Machine, a 30-minute late night music show in the same vein as shows like Club MTV or Soul Train. Hall co-produced the series with its host, singer/actress Nia Peeples, and it debuted on January 7, 1991, in syndication (usually following its parent series). Although initial ratings were high, especially in its larger markets, The Party Machine began sliding in the ratings quickly and the program was cancelled five months after its debut. Its final episode aired on September 15, 1991.

== See also ==
- List of late-night American network TV programs
