= Polly Draper =

American actress

- Born: Polly Carey Draper; June 15, 1955 (age 71); Gary, Indiana, U.S.
- Education: Yale University (BA, MFA)
- Occupations: Actress, filmmaker
- Years active: 1976–present
- Notable work: Thirtysomething (1987–91); The Tic Code (1999); The Naked Brothers Band (2007–09); Stella's Last Weekend (2018); Once Upon a Main Street (2020)
- Spouses: Kevin Wade (m. 1983; div. 1988) Michael Wolff (m. 1992)
- Children: Nat Wolff; Alex Wolff
- Father: William Henry Draper III
- Relatives: Jesse Draper (niece); Tim Draper (brother); William Henry Draper Jr. (grandfather)

Polly Carey Draper (born June 15, 1955) is an American actress and filmmaker. Draper has received several awards, including a Writers Guild of America Award (WGA), and is noted for speaking in a "trademark throaty voice." She gained recognition for her starring role in the ABC drama television series Thirtysomething (1987–91).

Draper's other acting credits include the TV movie adaption of Danielle Steel's Heartbeat (1993), her screenwriting debut film The Tic Code (1998), and off-Broadway in her play Getting into Heaven (2003). In mid-2004, she wrote her directorial debut The Naked Brothers Band: The Movie, and was the creator and showrunner for the Nickelodeon TV series The Naked Brothers Band (2007–09), which won her a WGA for Children's Script: Long Form or Special. Draper also wrote, directed, and co-starred in the TV movie Stella's Last Weekend (2018) before directing the film Once Upon a Main Street (2020). Polly Draper appeared as Tabitha "Tabby" Powell on Season 3 Episode 3 of the Fox drama series Doc.

== Personal life ==
Draper was born on June 15, 1955, in Gary, Indiana, to Phyllis (née Culbertson), a Peace Corps administrator, and William Henry Draper III, who was the CEO of the United Nations Development Programme and president of the U.S. Export-Import Bank. She has two siblings: venture capitalist Tim Draper and Rebecca Draper. Her grandfather is banker and diplomat William Henry Draper Jr.

Draper grew up in Chicago, Illinois, as well as Palo Alto and Arlington, California. In 1977, she earned her Bachelor of Arts degree from Yale University and Master of Fine Arts from the Yale School of Drama in 1980.

Following a five-year marriage with playwright Kevin Wade, Draper married musician Michael Wolff after meeting him in 1989 when making a cameo appearance on the syndicated late-night talk show Arsenio Hall, where Wolff served as the bandleader. Wolff's life with Tourette syndrome influenced The Tic Code; he provided the score. She and Wolff have two sons, Nat and Alex; the latter three played the father and sons in The Naked Brothers Band series and film, which also featured Draper's niece, Jesse, as the band's babysitter. More recently, she starred with her sons as their mother in Stella's Last Weekend.

Draper is a member of the Democratic Party; she donated money for John Kerry and Barack Obama's presidential campaigns in 2004 and 2008, respectively. Her father and late grandfather, William Henry Draper Jr., were members of the Republican Party. Draper's late mother, Phyllis, was a friend of former US first lady Barbara Bush's since the late 1980s; the two first met when Draper's father was leading the United Nations.

== Career ==
Draper began her acting career appearing Off-Broadway, including a role in Split (1980). She later starred as Ellyn Warren in the ABC drama television series Thirtysomething (1987–91), and in 1993, as Adrian in the NBC television movie adaptation of Danielle Steel's Heartbeat.

She starred in the off-Broadway production of Four Dogs and a Bone (1993), and also made appearances on TV shows, such as The Larry Sanders Show (1998); Monk and Law & Order: Criminal Intent, both in 2002; as well as in the Lifetime TV movie Too Young to Marry in 2007.

Draper played Laura Caraday in her screenwriting debut film The Tic Code (1998). In 2003, she starred as Cat, a lesbian singer with a drug addiction in her play Getting Into Heaven (2003) at The Flea Theater; she also wrote the music with her husband and then-young son, Nat. She played Nina in the Broadway production of Brooklyn Boy in 2005. In addition, Draper was the creator, showrunner, head writer, and director of the hit Nickelodeon musical comedy series The Naked Brothers Band (2007–09), which was adapted by the pilot movie of the same name that she originally wrote and directed as an independent film in mid-2004.

In 2010, she appeared with a recurring guest role in the Showtime comedic television drama The Big C. Draper directed her son Alex's play What Would Woody Do? (2010) at The Flea Theater. In 2011, she also wrote and starred in an episode of the Current TV science fiction series Bar Karma and appeared in the play My Brilliant Divorce (2012) at the Bay Street Theater. Since then, she appeared in the film Side Effects and in the CBS television drama Golden Boy, both in 2013. In 2014, Draper appeared in the film Obvious Child.

Draper portrayed Sally in her film, Stella's Last Weekend, released in 2018. In 2020, she appeared in Emma Seligman's film Shiva Baby as the main character's mother, Debbie. IndieWire said that "Draper's refreshing take on a Jewish mother brightens" the film, and Variety called her performance "delightfully witty". Edge said that "Draper deserves awards attention for her amusing yet keen embodiment of the Jewish mother". Rough Cut compares her performance in the film to her similar role in Obvious Child. In 2026 she appeared as Tabitha "Tabby" Powell in the Fox drama, Doc, season 3, episode 3.

== Awards ==
In 1988, Draper's work on Thirtysomething earned her an Emmy Award nomination for Outstanding Supporting Actress in a Drama Series. In addition, Four Dogs and a Bone (1993) obtained her a New York Magazine award for Best Broadway Actress. For The Tic Code (1998), she took the Bronze Gryphon Award for Best Actress at the Giffoni Film Festival.

Draper received the Audience Award for a Family Feature Film for The Naked Brothers Band: The Movie at the Hamptons International Film Festival in 2005. She had two Writers Guild Award nominations for The Naked Brothers Band TV series (2007–09). The first, in 2007, Draper was nominated in the section of Children's Episodic Shows & Specials for the episode "Nat is a Stand Up Guy". She was also given the Children's Script: Long Form or Special category for the TV movie "Polar Bears" in 2009.

In 2018, Stella's Last Weekend won Draper the Grand Prize at the San Antonio Film Festival.
