= Michael Wolff (musician) =

American jazz pianist (born 1952)

- Born: Michael Blieden Wolff; July 31, 1952 (age 73); Victorville, California, U.S.
- Origin: New Orleans, Louisiana
- Genres: Jazz
- Occupations: Musician, actor
- Instrument: Piano
- Years active: 1975–present
- Labels: Columbia, Pony Canyon, Razor & Tie
- Formerly of: Impure Thoughts
- Website: michaelwolff.com

Michael Blieden Wolff (born July 31, 1952) is an American jazz pianist, composer, and music producer. He became known for serving as the bandleader and musical director of The Arsenio Hall Show (1989–94).

Wolff was honored as a Steinway Artist and obtained a Broadcast Music, Inc. award. He provided the score for and co-produced The Tic Code (1998). He also co-starred with his sons, Nat and Alex, in the Nickelodeon musical comedy series The Naked Brothers Band (2007–09), earning him a BMI Cable Award for producing and supervising the series' music. Wolff was the leader of the jazz band Impure Thoughts. Reconstructed as Wolff & Clark Expedition, it is a jazz-funk group.

== Childhood and family life ==
Wolff was born on July 31, 1952, to a Jewish family in Victorville, California, and raised in New Orleans, Louisiana. He is the son of Lise (Silverman) and Marvin Wolff, a medical doctor who treated Elvis Presley when the Wolffs settled in Memphis, Tennessee. Michael began studying classical piano at age eight. When he was nine years old, his family moved to Berkeley, California, where he played drums at age 12. While attending Berkeley High School, Wolff started playing piano with the University of California Jazz Ensembles under the direction of David W. Tucker. After graduating from high school, Wolff attended the University of California, Berkeley before enrolling at the University of California, Los Angeles.

Wolff's mother remarried psychiatrist Neal Blumenfeld (Wolff's stepfather), who died on December 1, 2013. He has two step-siblings, Mimi and Judy. Wolff married actress Polly Draper in 1992; they have two sons together, Nat Wolff and Alex Wolff, who starred in and wrote the music for The Naked Brothers Band film and series that was created and produced by Draper. Draper also wrote and starred in The Tic Code, a musical drama film influenced by Wolff's life with Tourette syndrome to which he contributed the score.

== Career ==
Wolff left college in 1972 to begin his music career, joining Cal Tjader's band. He then joined Cannonball Adderley's band in 1975. In 1977, he formed the band Answering Service with saxophonist Alex Foster. Wolff worked with other famous artists, including Frank Sinatra, Warren Zevon, Bobby McFerrin, The Thad Jones/ Mel Lewis Orchestra, Sonny Rollins, Wayne Shorter, Jean-Luc Ponty, Children On The Corner, Terri Lyne Carrington, Tony Williams, and Christian McBride.

In 1978, singer Nancy Wilson chose Wolff as her musical director. Arsenio Hall was Wilson's opening act, and in 1989, when Hall was given his own talk show, Wolff was chosen to serve as its bandleader and musical director. He met his wife, actress Polly Draper, when she appeared as a guest on the show. In 1995, he released Jumpstart! featuring Christian McBride and Tony Williams and in 1997 the trio released 2AM. Wolff was the leader of the jazz band 'Impure Thoughts' which features Indian tabla player Badal Roy, drummer Mike Clark, percussionist Frank Colón and electric bassist John B. Williams.

He wrote music for the films Who's the Man?, The Tic Code, and Made up, as well as writing for and performing in other films. Wolff co-starred with his sons in The Naked Brothers Band television series on Nickelodeon, serving as the co-executive producer and music supervisor, which Draper created, executive produced, wrote, and directed. In addition, Wolff co-starred in and produced the music for The Naked Brothers Band: The Movie, which later served as the pilot for the TV series.

Wolff is on the faculty at The New School for Jazz and Contemporary Music. In the 2010s, he formed the jazz-funk band called the 'Wolff & Clark Expedition', consisting of Wolff and Clark as band leaders, with Steve Wilson and Lenny Pickett as saxophonists, and James Genus as the bassist.

== Discography ==
=== As leader ===
- 1993 Michael Wolff (Columbia)
- 1995 Jumpstart! (Jimco/Cabana)
- 1995 2 AM (Jimco)
- 1998 Portraiture: The Blues Period (Fuel 2000/Varèse Sarabande)
- 2000 The Tic Code Soundtrack (Razor & Tie)
- 2001 Impure Thoughts (Indianola)
- 2003 Intoxicate (Indianola)
- 2003 Christmas Moods (Artemis)
- 2003 Getting into Heaven
- 2004 Dangerous Vision (Artemis)
- 2005 Sexual Healing (3D)
- 2006 Love & Destruction (Wrong)
- 2007 Jazz, Jazz, Jazz (Wrong)
- 2009 Joe's Strut (Wrong)
- 2011 Detroit Dozen (Wrong)
- 2013 Wolff & Clark Expedition (Random Act)
- 2015 Wolff & Clark Expedition 2 (Random Act)
- 2019 Swirl (Sunnyside)
- 2020 Bounce (Sunnyside)
- 2024 A Letter to Bill Evans (Jazz Avenue)

=== As sideman ===
With Cannonball Adderley

- 1975 Phenix (Fantasy)
- 1975 Volume One: Montreal 1975 (Essential Media Group)

With David Axelrod

- 1993 Requiem The Holocaust (Liberty)
- 2003 The Big Country (Stateside)

With Tom Harrell

- 1975 Aurora (Adamo/Pinnacle)
- 1976 Bird Gets The Worm (Adamo/Pinnacle)

With Cal Tjader

- 1972 Live at Concerts by the Sea (Fantasy)
- 1999 Last Bolero in Berkeley (Fantasy)

With Nancy Wilson

- 1979 Live in Munich (Capitol)
- 1991 With My Lover Beside Me (Columbia)

With Warren Zevon

- 1995 Mutineer (Giant)
- 2002 My Ride's Here (Artemis)

With others

- Alex Foster, Pool of Dreams (Truspace, 1997)
- Dave Samuels, Tjaderized (Verve, 1998)
- Cal Tjader and Charlie Byrd, Tambu (Fantasy, 1973)

== Filmography ==
=== Film ===
Year	Film	Role	Notes
1987	Magic Sticks	Bob	
1998	The Tic Code	Engineer #2	Also co-producer and wrote original score
2005	The Naked Brothers Band: The Movie	Dad	Also contributed the underscore and produced and arranged the music
2007	The Girl in the Park	Jazz Club Piano Player	

=== Television ===
Year	Program or series	Role	Notes
1989–1994	The Arsenio Hall Show	Himself	Bandleader and musical director
1990	Beverly Hills, 90210	Duane	"Every Dream Has Its Price (Tag)" episode
2007–2009	The Naked Brothers Band	Dad/Mr. Wolff/Sonny Wolff	Also co-executive producer, music producer, and music supervisor

== Awards and honors ==
Wolff was honored as a Steinway Artist in June 2006. The Tic Code won awards at the Berlin International Film Festival, Giffoni Film Festival and Hamptons International Film Festival. With his sons, Wolff won a Broadcast Music Cable Award in 2007 for the music on The Naked Brothers Band TV series.
