= Thomas K. Finletter =

American lawyer, politician, and statesman

Thomas Finletter
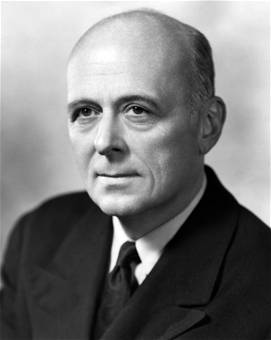

5th United States Ambassador to NATO
- In office March 2, 1961 – September 2, 1965
- President: John F. Kennedy; Lyndon B. Johnson
- Preceded by: Warren Randolph Burgess
- Succeeded by: Harlan Cleveland

United States Secretary of the Air Force
- In office April 24, 1950 – January 20, 1953
- President: Harry S. Truman
- Preceded by: Stuart Symington
- Succeeded by: Harold E. Talbott

Personal details
- Born: Thomas Knight Finletter; November 11, 1893 Philadelphia, Pennsylvania, U.S.
- Died: April 24, 1980 (aged 86) New York City, New York, U.S.
- Party: Democratic
- Education: University of Pennsylvania (BA, LLB)

Military service
- Branch/service: United States Army
- Rank: Captain

Thomas Knight Finletter (November 11, 1893 – April 24, 1980) was an American lawyer, politician, and statesman.

== Early life ==
Finletter was born in Philadelphia, Pennsylvania, the son of Thomas Dickson Finletter and Helen Grill Finletter. He was the grandson of Thomas K. Finletter, for whom the Thomas K. Finletter School in Philadelphia is named.

He took his early education at The Episcopal Academy in Philadelphia and graduated from the University of Pennsylvania with both Bachelor of Arts degree in 1915 and bachelor of laws in 1920. He also served as editor-in-chief of the University of Pennsylvania Law Review. In 1920, he married Gretchen Blaine Damrosch, daughter of the conductor Walter Damrosch and granddaughter of Secretary of State James G. Blaine.

== Career ==
In World War I, he served with the 312th Field Artillery advancing to the rank of captain. He was admitted to the Pennsylvania bar in 1920 and the New York Bar in 1921.

Finletter practiced law in New York until he began his government service in 1941, as a special assistant to Secretary of State Cordell Hull on international economic affairs. In 1943, he was appointed executive director and later deputy director of the Office of Foreign Economic Coordinator (OFEC). In this post, he was in charge of planning economic activities related to liberated areas and was in control of matters of foreign exchange and matters relating to the operations of the Alien Property Custodian. Finletter resigned his post in 1944, when the functions of OFEC were absorbed by the newly created Foreign Economic Administration.

In 1945, Finletter acted as consultant at the United Nations Conference on International Organization at San Francisco.

In the same year he was a cosigner of the "Declaration of the Dublin, N.H., Conference", a declaration on world peace issued by the Dublin Conference on World Peace. The declaration stated that the United Nations was inadequate to maintain world peace, and advocated a world federal government.

He returned back to public service July 18, 1947, when President Harry S. Truman established a temporary, five-man commission that inquired into all phases of aviation and drafted the national air policy report. This commission was sometimes known as "The Finletter Commission". Finletter served as chairman of the Air Policy Commission which, on January 1, 1948, sent to the president the report entitled "Survival in the Air Age."

Finletter was chief of the Economic Cooperation Administration's mission to the United Kingdom with headquarters in London, to which he had been appointed early in 1949.

=== Secretary of the Air Force ===
President Truman appointed Finletter as the second Secretary of the Air Force succeeding Stuart Symington on April 24, 1950, in which office he served until January 20, 1953.

In 1958, Finletter was a candidate for the Democratic nomination for the U.S. Senate from New York. He won the support of some liberal reformers, prominently including Eleanor Roosevelt, and was chosen as the Liberal Party's candidate, though the Democratic Convention preferred Frank Hogan. Finletter then withdrew from the Liberal ticket, endorsing Hogan.

=== Diplomatic service ===
President John F. Kennedy appointed Finletter to be the Ambassador to NATO to succeed William Henry Draper Jr. in 1961. He served in that office until 1965 when he was replaced by Harlan Cleveland.

=== Later life ===
In 1965, following his term as Ambassador to NATO, he retired from government service and returned to his law practice with the firm of Coudert Brothers, in New York City. In January 1967, he approached Senator Eugene McCarthy to see if he was interested in challenging Lyndon Johnson for the 1968 Democratic nomination for president, on the issue of the Vietnam War. McCarthy did go on to challenge Johnson, but failed to win the Democratic nomination. Finletter died on April 24, 1980.

== Book ==
- Interim Report on the U.S. Search for a Substitute for Isolation, W.W. Norton & Co., Inc., New York: 1968

== Political and Professional Affiliations ==
- Americans for Democratic Action
- Council on Foreign Relations
- United World Federalists
- Delta Phi

== See also ==
- Pace-Finletter MOU 1952

== Notes ==
Political offices
Preceded by Stuart Symington	United States Secretary of the Air Force; 1950–1953	Succeeded by Harold E. Talbott
Diplomatic posts
Preceded by William Draper	United States Ambassador to NATO; 1961–1965	Succeeded by Harlan Cleveland
