= Richard Wigglesworth =

Richard Wigglesworth may refer to:

- Richard Wigglesworth (rugby union) (born 1983), English rugby union player
- Richard B. Wigglesworth (1891–1960), American politician and diplomat
