= United States Under Secretary of War =

United States Under Secretary of War of War
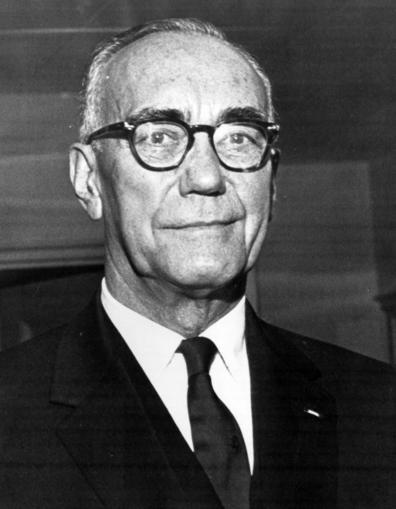
- Last officeholder William Henry Draper Jr. 29 August 1947 - 17 September 1947
- Reports to: Secretary of War
- Appointer: President
- Formation: 16 December 1940
- First holder: Robert P. Patterson
- Final holder: William Henry Draper Jr.
- Abolished: 17 September 1947

The Under Secretary of War was a position created by an act of 16 December 1940 (54 Stat. 1224). At the same time, section 5a of the National Defense Act (1920) was amended to allow the United States secretary of war to assign his responsibilities for procurement to any of his subordinates. The statute formerly assigned these responsibilities to the United States assistant secretary of war. The assistant secretary of war, Robert P. Patterson was nominated and confirmed in the post. The secretary of war delegated his responsibilities for procurement to the under secretary on 28 April 1941. By November 1941 the Office of the Under Secretary of War (OUSW) employed 1,136 people, of whom 257 were military officers and the remainder civilians.

== List of Under Secretaries of War ==
The position of the Under Secretary of War was held by the following:

#	Picture	Name	State of Residence	Began Service	Ended Service	Reference
1		Robert P. Patterson	New York	16 December 1940	26 September 1945	
2		Kenneth C. Royall	North Carolina	9 November 1945	23 July 1947	
3		William Henry Draper Jr.	New York	29 August 1947	17 September 1947	
