= Tahawus, New York =

Ghost town in New York, United States

Coordinates: 44°03′02″N 74°03′04″W

Construction being done on top of the old McIntyre Blast Furnace near Tahawus, New York, as part of stabilization and brush cleaning for restoration of the structure (July 2007)

Tahawus (also called Adirondac, or McIntyre, pronounced /təˈhɔːz/ tə-HAWZ) was a village in the Town of Newcomb, Essex County, New York, United States. It is now a ghost town situated in the Adirondack Park. Tahawus is located in Essex County within the unpopulated northern area designated to the town of Newcomb. Tahawus was the site of major mining and iron smelting operations in the 19th century. Although standing as recently as 2005, the last mining facilities have since been demolished and removed (with the exception of some minor garages, blast furnaces and outbuildings).

It was in Tahawus in 1901 that Vice President Theodore Roosevelt learned President William McKinley was dying.

The Adirondack Iron and Steel Company was listed on the National Register of Historic Places in 1977.

== History ==
In the nineteenth century the area was mined for iron ore. Adirondac, New York was a company town of the Adirondack Iron Works. Iron deposits were first found here in 1826 by Archibald McIntyre and David Henderson. The iron was extracted at what was known as the Upper Works with moderate success between 1827 and 1857. In 1857, after a struggle, the Adirondack Iron Works surrendered to the remoteness of the wilderness and Adirondac became known as the "deserted village". Impurities of titanium dioxide were present in the iron, which made it difficult for equipment of that era to properly process the ore. A local flood and a nationwide economic crisis were also factors in the closure of the Upper Works. According to the New York State Adirondack Park Agency:

Throughout its existence, the Adirondack Iron Works operated two farms, the blast furnace and forge, a puddling furnace, charcoal and brick kilns, trip hammers and a grist and saw mill. The Village consisted of sixteen dwellings and a building with a cupola, used as school, church and the general assembly room.

The first bank in the Adirondack Mountains opened in the hamlet of Adirondac. The mine and related works operated from 1827 to 1857, after which residents abandoned the community. The enterprise closed due in part to difficulties in extracting an unknown impurity from the local ore.

=== Mine abandoned ===
During the latter nineteenth century the principal land uses at the Tahawus tract were lumbering and game. The private and relatively informal Preston Ponds Club was formed in February 1876 by James R. Thompson, an agent of the Adirondack Iron Works. Prior to this time he had been using the property for his own recreational purposes, inviting family and friends to come for hunting and fishing trips. But with the official club, he and his associates were better able to protect the fish and game and to socialize as well. The club leased an area around the three Preston Ponds from the Adirondack Iron and Steel Company – a later incorporation of the Adirondack Iron Works. In January 1877, the club was reorganized and incorporated as the "Adirondack Club" and the entire Tahawus Tract was leased from the heirs of the original Adirondack Iron Works. In 1898 the club renamed itself again to the Tahawus Club. Club management continued to lease the Tahawus tract lands from the mine owners' heirs.

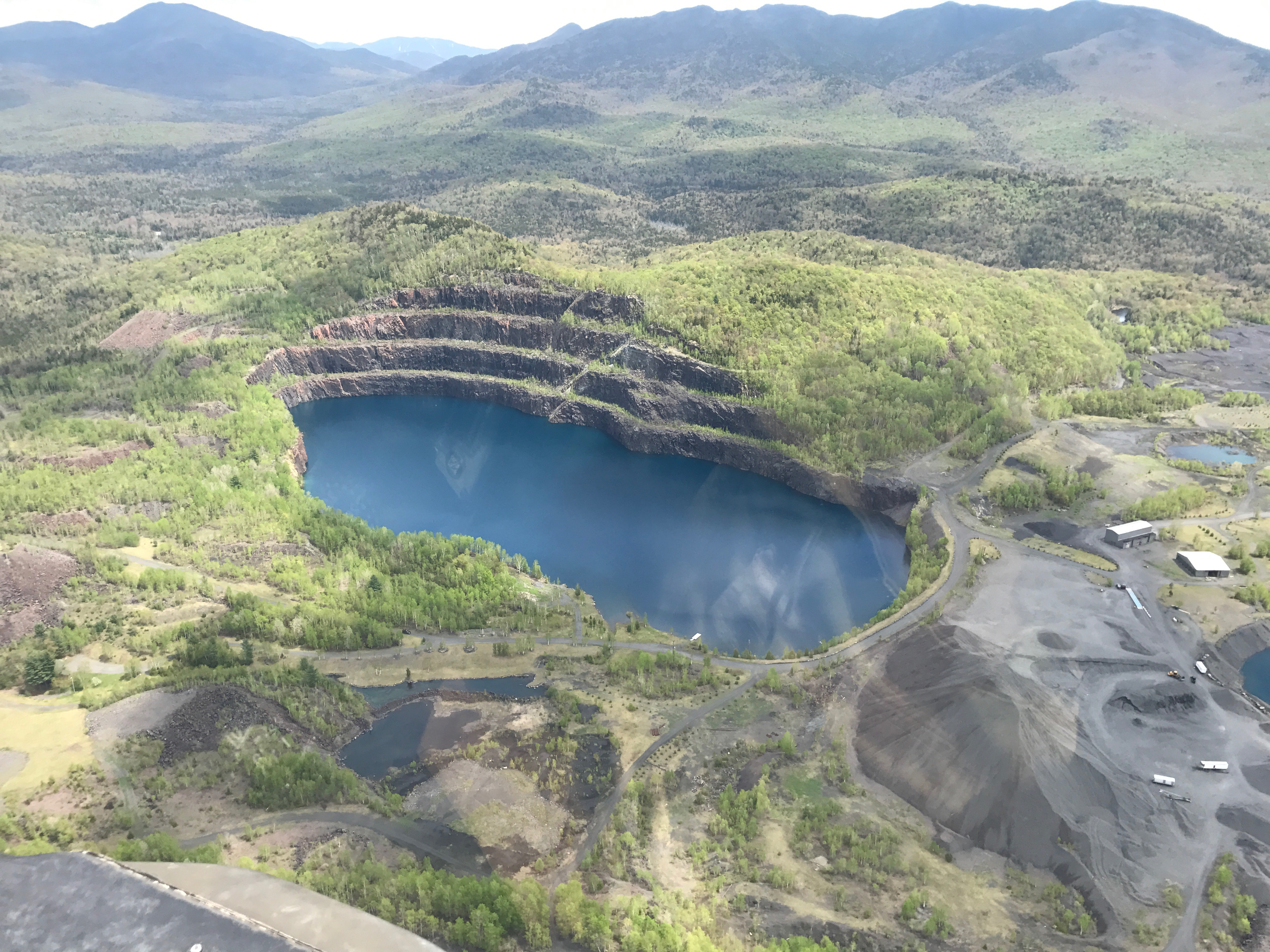
Flooded quarry lake in Tahawus, New York, southwest of Mt. Marcy, May 2017

=== Theodore Roosevelt's visit ===
Vice President Theodore Roosevelt was visiting Tahawus in 1901 during the final days of President William McKinley's presidency. Roosevelt had been vacationing in Vermont, but quickly left for Buffalo, New York after learning that President William McKinley had recently been shot by anarchist Leon Czolgosz. Hearing of the President's good prognosis and expecting a quick recovery, Roosevelt embarked on a hiking trip up Mount Marcy from Adirondac, where his family was staying. Three hours into the trip, a mounted park ranger alerted him that McKinley was in critical condition. Roosevelt began the trip from Tahawus to Buffalo, and learned of McKinley's death while at the North Creek Railroad Station.

=== Mine reopening ===
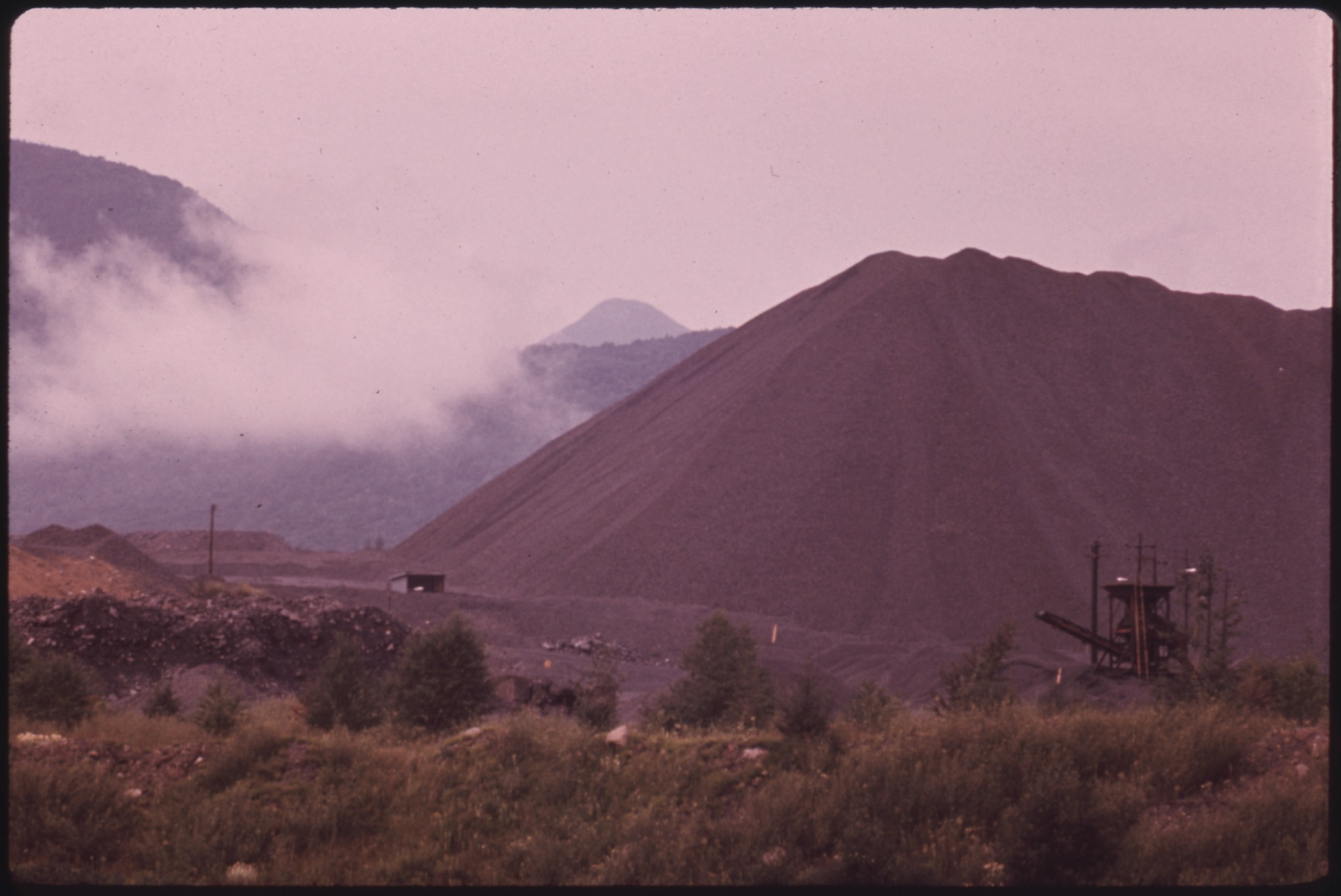
Pile of tailings, 1973

In 1940 a new mine opened, this time for the purpose of obtaining the titanium dioxide that had been partly responsible for the previous mine's commercial failure. In 1940 National Lead Industries reopened the mines along Sanford Lake. This location, known as the Lower Works, was about a mile south of the original operation. A new community was established in 1943 for the mine workers which was called Tahawus. By 1945, Tahawus had 84 buildings. Some of the buildings left over at Adirondac were also used. Forty million tons of titanium were extracted at the National Lead Industries' mines before operations ceased in 1989.

=== Conservation ===
The Open Space Institute took an interest in the property for conservation purposes because of its interest in the Hudson River watershed. Joe Martens, former president of the institute, described the Tahawus tract as "absolutely breathtaking." He continues, "Its defining natural features include rugged mountains, crystal clear, glacially carved lakes, and the headwaters of the Hudson River." Four years after the 1989 mine closure the Open Space Institute opened purchase negotiations, which concluded in 2003 as a public-private partnership with the New York Department of Environmental Conservation purchasing the 10,000-acre (40 km^{2}) Tahawus tract in August 2003 for US$8.5 million and the OSI sharing management responsibilities.

== Tahawus today ==
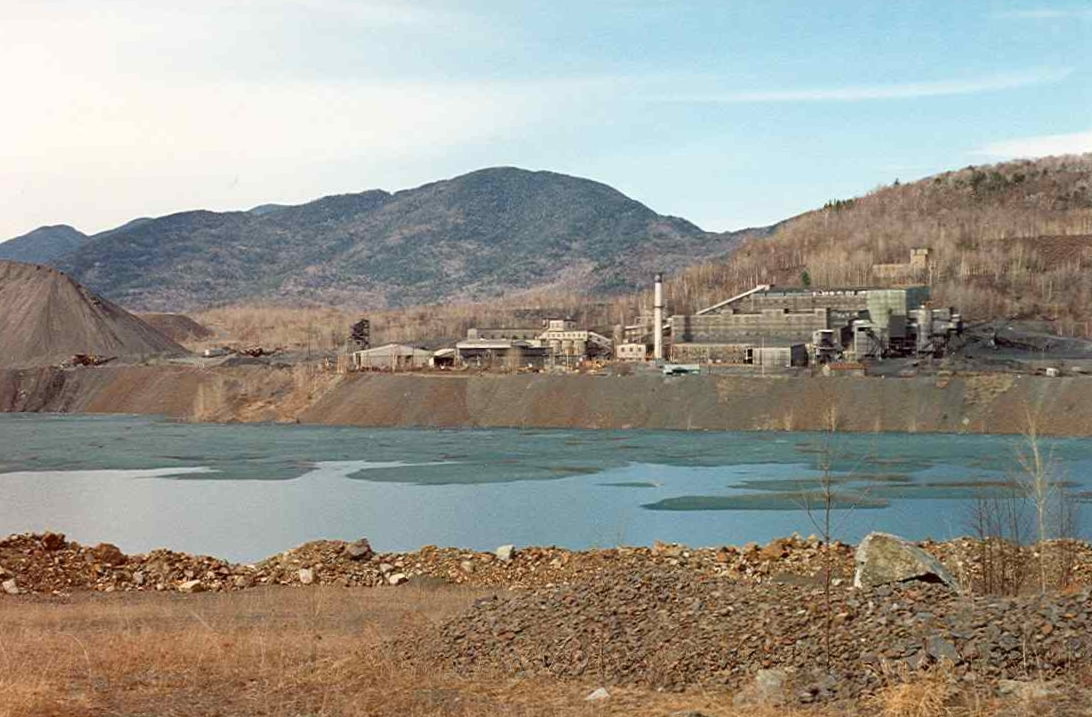
Former National Lead Industries mine at Tahawus

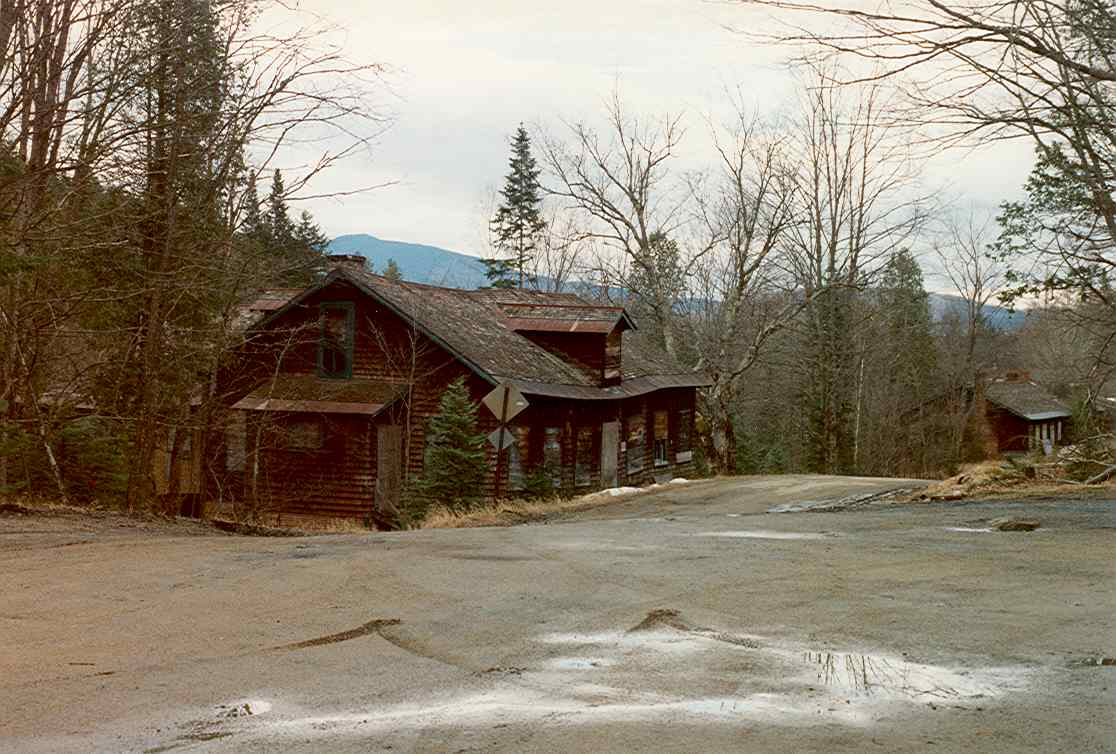
Adirondac in 1994

The remains of at least 10 buildings remain on the former village site; most of them were constructed between 1890 and 1930 by the Tahawus Club. Only one of the buildings still standing on the site dates from the years when the old mining village of Adirondac was in operation, along with the remnants of the McIntyre Blast Furnace (built 1854). The furnace site has recently been cleared, and the furnace stack stabilized and cleaned. This was done as part of the Tahawus Tract project undertaken by the Open Space Institute which purchased the area in August 2003. Also, as part of a grant given for area cleanup and historic preservation, the old MacNaughton Cottage (built in 1845, one of the approximately ten remaining buildings) underwent restoration. This was the house that Vice President Theodore Roosevelt stayed in during his hike to Mount Marcy when he received news of President William McKinley being close to death after being shot in Buffalo, New York on September 6, 1901. No buildings are known to remain at the latter community of Tahawus along Sanford Lake, including the mines.

== Geography ==
Tahawus is also a name sometimes used for Mount Marcy, the highest peak in New York, located outside of the town. However, the name was likely never used by the aboriginal peoples of the area to refer to the mountain, and its meaning, "Cloud-Splitter", may have no roots in any language.

Located within the Tahawus tract is Henderson Lake, a 450-acre (1.8 km^{2}) lake which serves as the true source of the Hudson River. Tahawus also contains Mount Adams and several minor Adirondack peaks. According to the Adirondack Park Agency, wildlife in the tract include "bears, deer, loons, coyotes, foxes...and the elusive Pine Marten".

=== Transportation ===
Only one county-maintained highway passes through Tahawus, Essex County Route 25, better known as Tahawus Road. CR 25 brings drivers northward to Henderson Lake. It connects with New York State Route 28N approximately south of the town.
