= List of United States permanent representatives to NATO =

American official; ambassador to NATO

Permanent Representative of the United States to NATO
- Seal of the United States Department of State

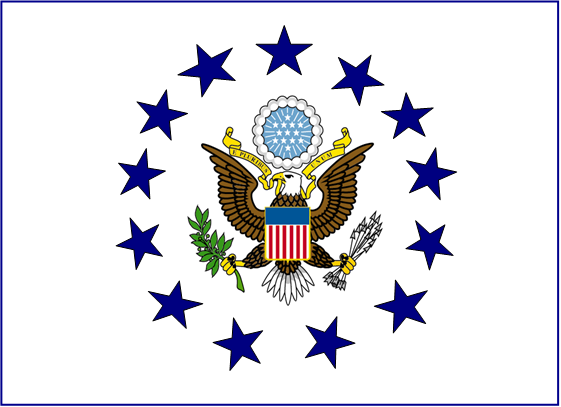
- Flag of a United States chief of mission

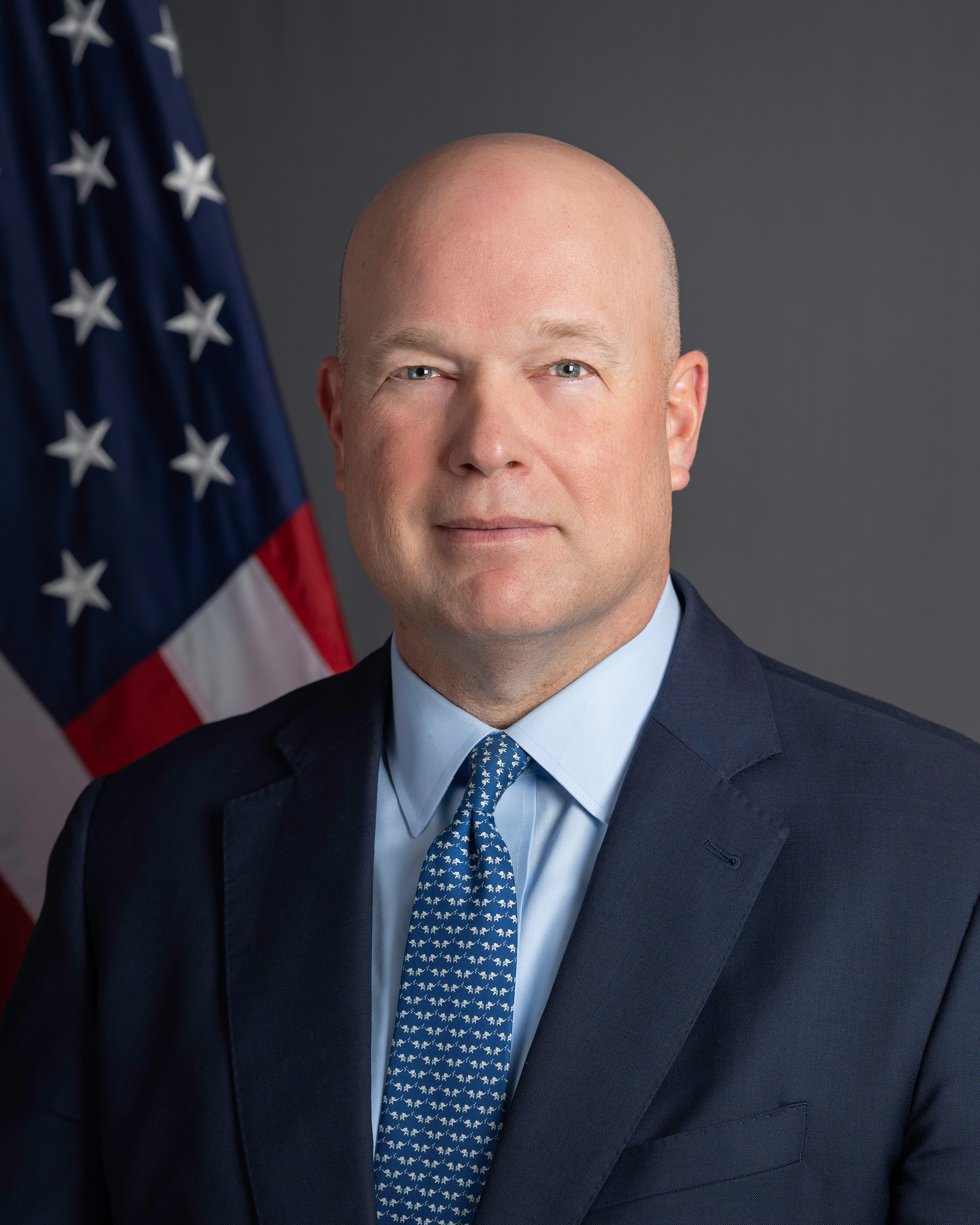
- Incumbent; Matthew Whitaker since April 3, 2025
- Nominator: The president of the United States
- Appointer: The president of the United States with Senate advice and consent
- Inaugural holder: William H. Draper Jr. as Ambassador Extraordinary and Plenipotentiary
- Formation: April 8, 1953
- Website: U.S. Mission - NATO

The United States permanent representative to NATO (commonly referred to as the U.S. ambassador to NATO) is the official representative of the United States mission to NATO. The representative has the rank of full ambassador and is appointed by the president and confirmed by the Senate. The official title of the representative is United States permanent representative on the Council of the North Atlantic Treaty Organization, with the rank and status of ambassador extraordinary and plenipotentiary.

The first representative was appointed by President Dwight D. Eisenhower in 1953, which was William H. Draper Jr.

== List ==
| # | Portrait | Ambassador | Dates served |
|---|---|---|---|
| 1 | | William Henry Draper Jr. | April 8, 1953 – June 13, 1953 |
| 2 | | John Chambers Hughes | June 12, 1953 – April 20, 1955 |
| 3 | | George Walbridge Perkins Jr. | March 14, 1955 – October 12, 1957 |
| 4 | | Warren Randolph Burgess | September 21, 1957 – March 23, 1961 |
| 5 | | Thomas K. Finletter | March 2, 1961 – September 2, 1965 |
| 6 | | Harlan Cleveland | September 1, 1965 – June 11, 1969 |
| 7 | | Robert Ellsworth | May 13, 1969 – June 30, 1971 |
| 8 | | David M. Kennedy | March 17, 1972 – February 1, 1973 |
| 9 | | Donald Rumsfeld | February 2, 1973 – December 5, 1974 |
| 10 | | David K. E. Bruce | October 17, 1974 – February 12, 1976 |
| 11 | | Robert Strausz-Hupé | March 3, 1976 – April 20, 1977 |
| 12 | | William Tapley Bennett Jr. | April 26, 1977 – March 31, 1983 |
| 13 | | David Manker Abshire | July 13, 1983 – January 5, 1987 |
| 14 | | Alton G. Keel Jr. | March 13, 1987 – June 17, 1989 |
| 15 | | William Howard Taft IV | August 3, 1989 – June 26, 1992 |
| 16 | | Reginald Bartholomew | June 15, 1992 – March 25, 1993 |
| 17 | | Robert E. Hunter | July 1, 1993 – December 31, 1997 |
| 18 | | Alexander Vershbow | January 1, 1998 – July 9, 2001 |
| 19 | | R. Nicholas Burns | August 7, 2001 – March 7, 2005 |
| 20 | | Victoria Nuland | July 13, 2005 – May 2, 2008 |
| 21 | | Kurt Volker | July 2, 2008 – May 13, 2009 |
| 22 | | Ivo H. Daalder | May 15, 2009 – July 6, 2013 |
| 23 | | Douglas Lute | September 3, 2013 – January 20, 2017 |
| 24 | | Kay Bailey Hutchison | August 28, 2017 – January 20, 2021 |
| - | | Douglas D. Jones (acting) | January 20, 2021 – September 27, 2021 |
| 25 | | Julianne Smith | December 6, 2021 – October 23, 2024 |
| - | | Scott Oudkirk (acting) | October 24, 2024 – April 3, 2025 |
| 26 | | Matthew Whitaker | April 3, 2025 - present |

== Sources ==
- List of NATO ambassadors — US State Department
