= Kenneth Claiborne Royall =

US Army general and Secretary of War and Army (1894–1971)

Kenneth Royall
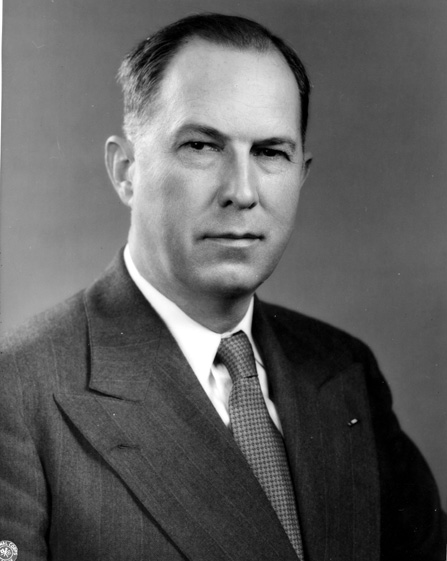
- Official portrait, c. 1947

56th United States Secretary of War
- In office July 19, 1947 – September 18, 1947
- President: Harry S. Truman
- Preceded by: Robert P. Patterson
- Succeeded by: Position abolished (James Forrestal as Secretary of Defense)

United States Under Secretary of War
- In office November 9, 1945 – July 18, 1947
- President: Harry S. Truman
- Preceded by: Robert P. Patterson
- Succeeded by: William Henry Draper Jr.

1st United States Secretary of the Army
- In office September 18, 1947 – April 27, 1949
- President: Harry S. Truman
- Preceded by: Office established
- Succeeded by: Gordon Gray

Personal details
- Born: Kenneth Claiborne Royall; July 24, 1894 Goldsboro, North Carolina, U.S.
- Died: May 25, 1971 (aged 76) Durham, North Carolina, U.S.
- Party: Democratic
- Spouse: Margaret Pierce Best (m. 1917)
- Children: 3, including Kenneth Jr.
- Education: University of North Carolina, Chapel Hill (BA); Harvard University (LLB)

Military service
- Allegiance: United States
- Branch/service: United States Army
- Years of service: 1917–1921; 1942–1945
- Rank: Brigadier General
- Battles/wars: World War I World War II

Kenneth Claiborne Royall Sr. (July 24, 1894 – May 25, 1971) was a U.S. Army general and the last man to hold the office of Secretary of War, which was abolished in 1947. Royall served as the first Secretary of the Army from 1947 to 1949, until he was compelled into retirement for refusing to comply with President Harry S. Truman's Executive Order 9981 for racial desegregation of the military forces of the United States.

== Early life and military career ==
Kenneth Claiborne Royall was born on July 24, 1894, in Goldsboro, North Carolina, the son of Clara Howard Jones and George Pender Royall. He graduated from Episcopal High School in Alexandria, Virginia and the University of North Carolina at Chapel Hill, where he was a member of the Delta Kappa Epsilon fraternity, and Harvard Law School before serving in World War I. He then practiced law and was elected to the North Carolina Senate as a Democrat. At the beginning of World War II, he became a colonel in the U.S. Army.

According to a 2006 newspaper column by Jack Betts, eight German agents bent on mayhem came ashore on Long Island in 1942 but were soon caught and ordered to stand trial in a secret military tribunal. U.S. President Franklin Roosevelt appointed Royall to defend them, but, wanting a swift conclusion to the process, with the Germans executed as soon as possible, ordered Royall to avoid civilian courts. Royall wrote to Roosevelt that he thought the president had no authority to convene a secret court to try his clients, and asked him to change his order. The president refused, and Royall appealed to the U.S. District Court, arguing the secret tribunal was unconstitutional.

The court rejected this argument and so Royall and other lawyers in his office appealed to the Supreme Court, which rejected Royall's argument in a brief announcement in July 1942 and upheld the right of the president to appoint a secret tribunal. However, Royall had succeeded in getting civilian court review of the tribunals' constitutionality despite the president's predilection for secrecy.

The Supreme Court published a more detailed opinion in October, saying, "Constitutional safeguards for the protection of all who are charged with offense are not to be disregarded." By then, six of Royall's clients were dead. They had been tried, convicted, and executed in August, days after the Supreme Court's brief announcement upholding Roosevelt's tribunals. Two who turned themselves in and betrayed the others had their death sentences commuted to prison terms. Royall later said he believed his defense of the Germans was his most important work in a long and illustrious career. He was promoted to brigadier general.

== Truman administration ==
Royall served as Undersecretary of War from November 9, 1945 until July 18, 1947. President Harry S. Truman named him Secretary of War in 1947. He became the first Secretary of the Army two months later.

In 1948, Royall refused to make public the documentary "Nuremberg: Its Lesson For Today" because "due to policy changes, 'Nuremberg' was not in the interest of the 'army or the nation' and would not be released to the general public".

Royall was forced into retirement in April 1949 for continuing to refuse to desegregate the Army, nearly a year after President Truman promulgated Executive Order 9981.

== Personal life ==
On August 18, 1917, Royall married the former Margaret Pierce Best, with whom he had three children: Kenneth Claiborne Jr., Margaret, and George Pender Royall.

== Later life and death ==
In December 1949, Royall became a partner at the prestigious New York City law firm of Dwight, Harris, Koegel and Caskey, becoming the firm's head in 1958. The firm was later renamed Rogers & Wells, and it was subsequently known as Clifford Chance Rogers & Wells after its merger with the British firm Clifford Chance.

Royall died in Durham, North Carolina, on May 25, 1971, aged 76. He was buried at Willow Dale Cemetery in Goldsboro, North Carolina.

His son Kenneth C. Royall Jr. (1918–1999) served in the North Carolina House of Representatives from 1967 to 1972 and the North Carolina Senate from 1973 to 1992.

Political offices
Preceded by Himself as United States Secretary of War	United States Secretary of the Army; September 18, 1947 – April 27, 1949	Succeeded by Gordon Gray
Preceded by Robert P. Patterson	U.S. Secretary of War; Served under: Harry S. Truman; July 19, 1947 – September 18, 1947	Succeeded by Himself as United States Secretary of the Army
Preceded by Robert P. Patterson	United States Under Secretary of War; November 9, 1945 – July 18, 1947	Succeeded by William Henry Draper Jr.
