= William Henry Draper Jr. =

American soldier and politician (1894–1974)

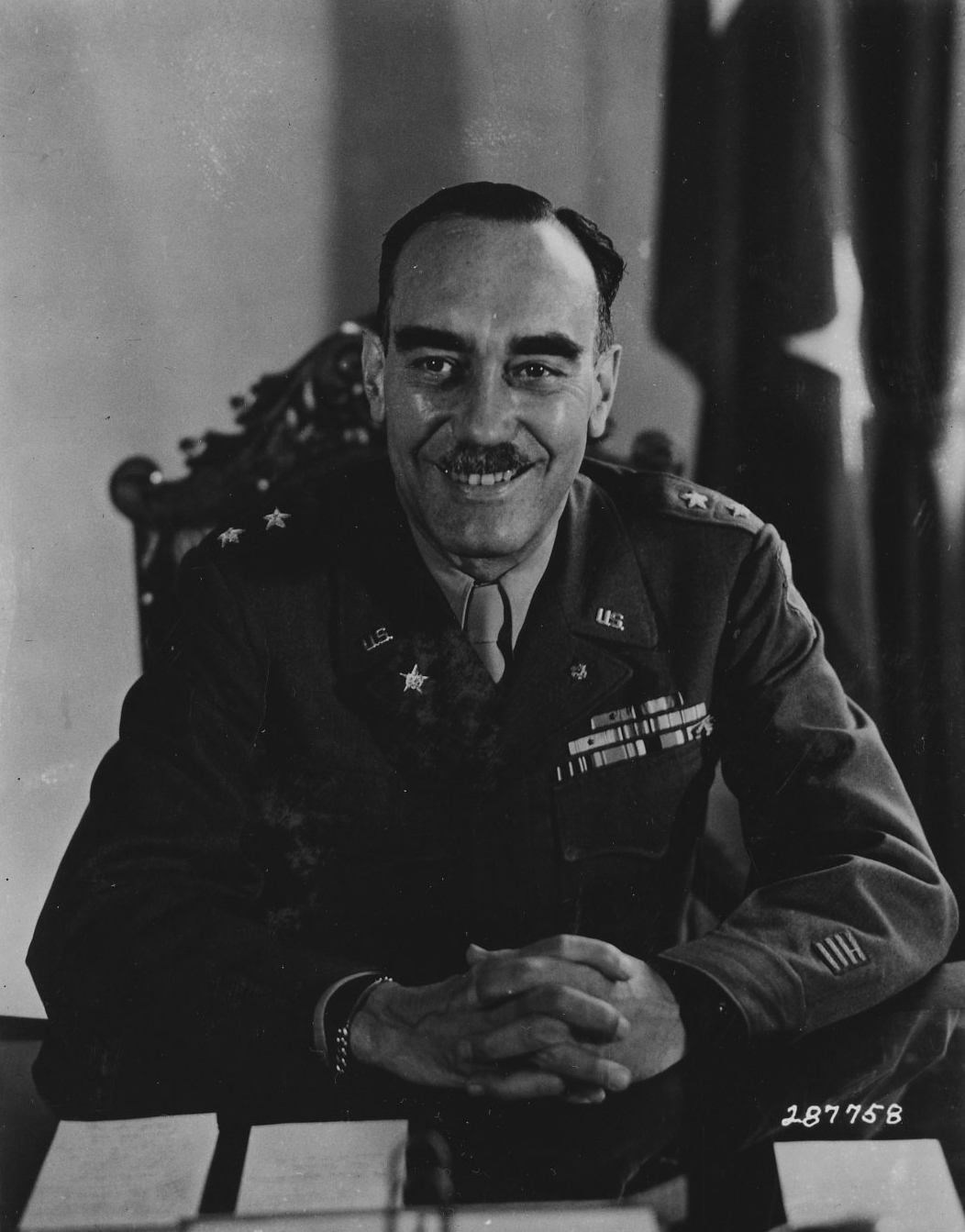

1st United States Ambassador to the North Atlantic Treaty Organization
- In office April 8, 1953 – June 13, 1953
- President: Dwight D. Eisenhower
- Preceded by: Position established
- Succeeded by: John Chambers Hughes

United States Under Secretary of the Army
- In office September 18, 1947 – February 28, 1949
- President: Harry S. Truman
- Preceded by: Position established
- Succeeded by: Gordon Gray

United States Under Secretary of War
- In office August 29, 1947 – September 17, 1947
- President: Harry S. Truman
- Preceded by: Kenneth Royall
- Succeeded by: Office abolished

Personal details
- Born: August 10, 1894 New York City, U.S.
- Died: December 26, 1974 (aged 80) Naples, Florida, U.S.
- Party: Republican
- Spouse: Katherine Baum
- Education: New York University (BA, MA)

Military service
- Branch/service: United States Army
- Years of service: 1918–1949
- Rank: Major General

William Henry Draper Jr. (August 10, 1894 – December 26, 1974) was an American army officer, banker, government official, and diplomat.

== Early life ==
William Henry Draper Jr., was born on August 10, 1894, in Harlem, New York City. His parents were Mary Emma (née Carey) Draper (1872–1960) and William Henry Draper (1859–1929).

Draper received a B.A. and M.A. in economics at New York University.

== Career ==
Dillon, Read & Co. logo

Draper joined the U.S. Army soon after finishing college and served during World War I as a major in the infantry. After the war, he stayed in the Organized Reserve and worked his way up to chief of staff of the 77th Division from 1936 to 1940.

From 1919 to 1921, he worked for National City Bank in New York City. He later worked for Bankers Trust from 1923 to 1927, and then Dillon, Read & Co. from 1927. In 1937, he was made a vice president of Dillon Read. Dillon Read promoted bonds of the Soviet Union after its recognition by the U.S. government in 1933. Dillon Read also underwrote millions of dollars' worth of German industrial bonds in the United States in the 1920s and 1930s. He worked for Dillon Read until 1953.

=== Public service ===
At the invitation of George Marshall, he moved to Washington, D.C., to serve on the President's Advisory Committee for Selective Service, and he was promoted to colonel in 1940. At the start of World War II, he took command of the 136th Infantry, 33rd Division, National Guard.

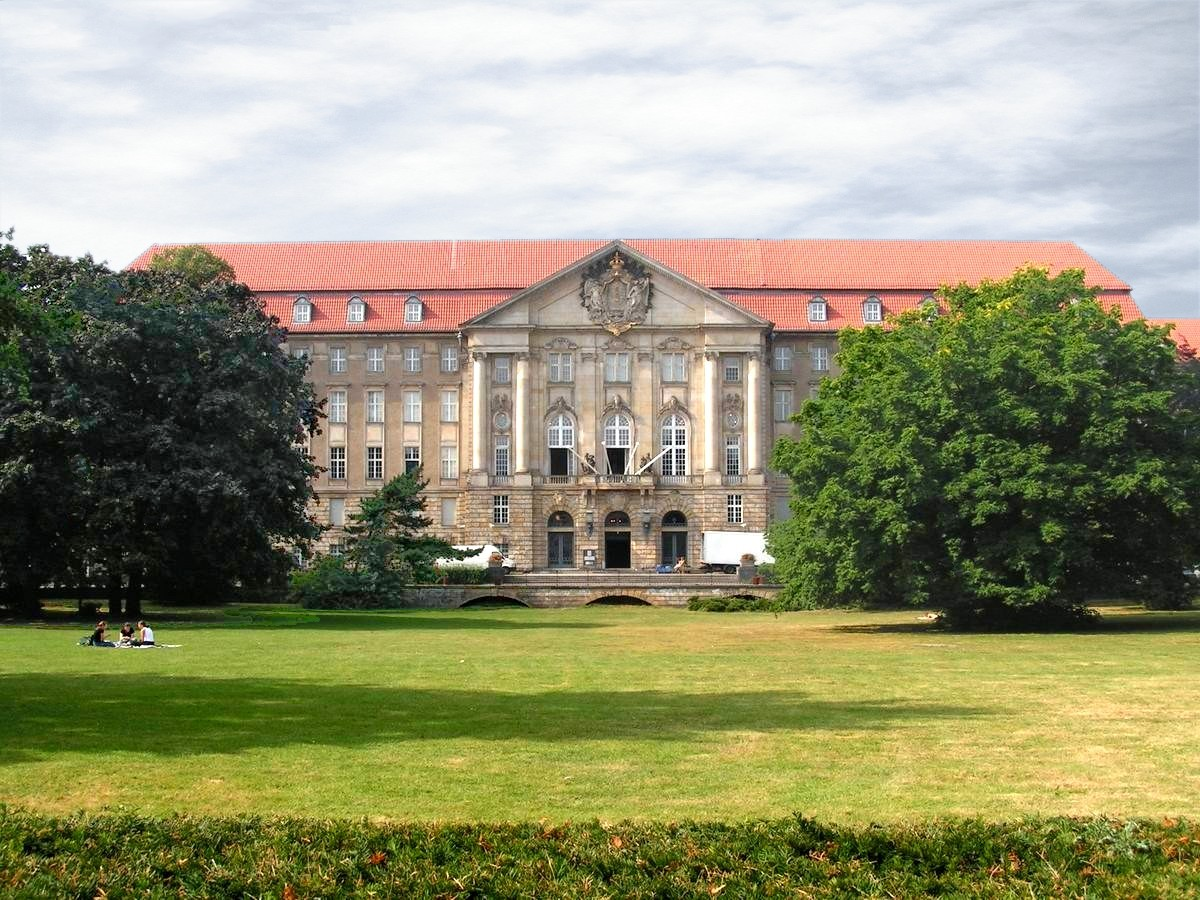
Kammergericht, 1945–1990 Allied Control Council

At the end of the war, he was promoted to brigadier general and was posted to Berlin to serve as chief of the Economics Division, Allied Control Council for Germany from 1945 to 1947. He opposed the Morgenthau Plan, which was designed to prevent a resurgence of German economic and military power by deindustrializing it and turning into a pastoral country. Instead, he strongly supported measures to expedite Germany's economic recovery along liberal free-market and democratic lines followed by Konrad Adenauer and Ludwig Erhard. There was some criticism of him by the Chief of the Decartelization Branch for Military Government in Germany after World War II, James Stewart Martin for leaving some former Nazis in their positions in industry, in particular Alexander Kreuter.

After a promotion to major-general, Draper was asked by the new Secretary of War Kenneth C. Royall to become his Under Secretary of War. With the transition of the Department of War to the Department of the Army, Draper became the first under secretary of the Army from September 18, 1947, to February 28, 1949. Later in 1949, he rejoined Dillon Read as a senior partner. According to the Annenberg CPB documentary "The Pacific Century, Ep.5 Reinventing Japan" Gen. Draper, referred to therein as the "Wall Street General" was instrumental in overturning some key progressive reforms sought by Colonel Charles Kades of the Supreme Command Allied Powers (SCAP) in occupied Japan.

Draper served as Long Island Rail Road trustee from 1950 to 1951. He served as the first US Ambassador to NATO in Paris.

=== Hiss Case involvement ===
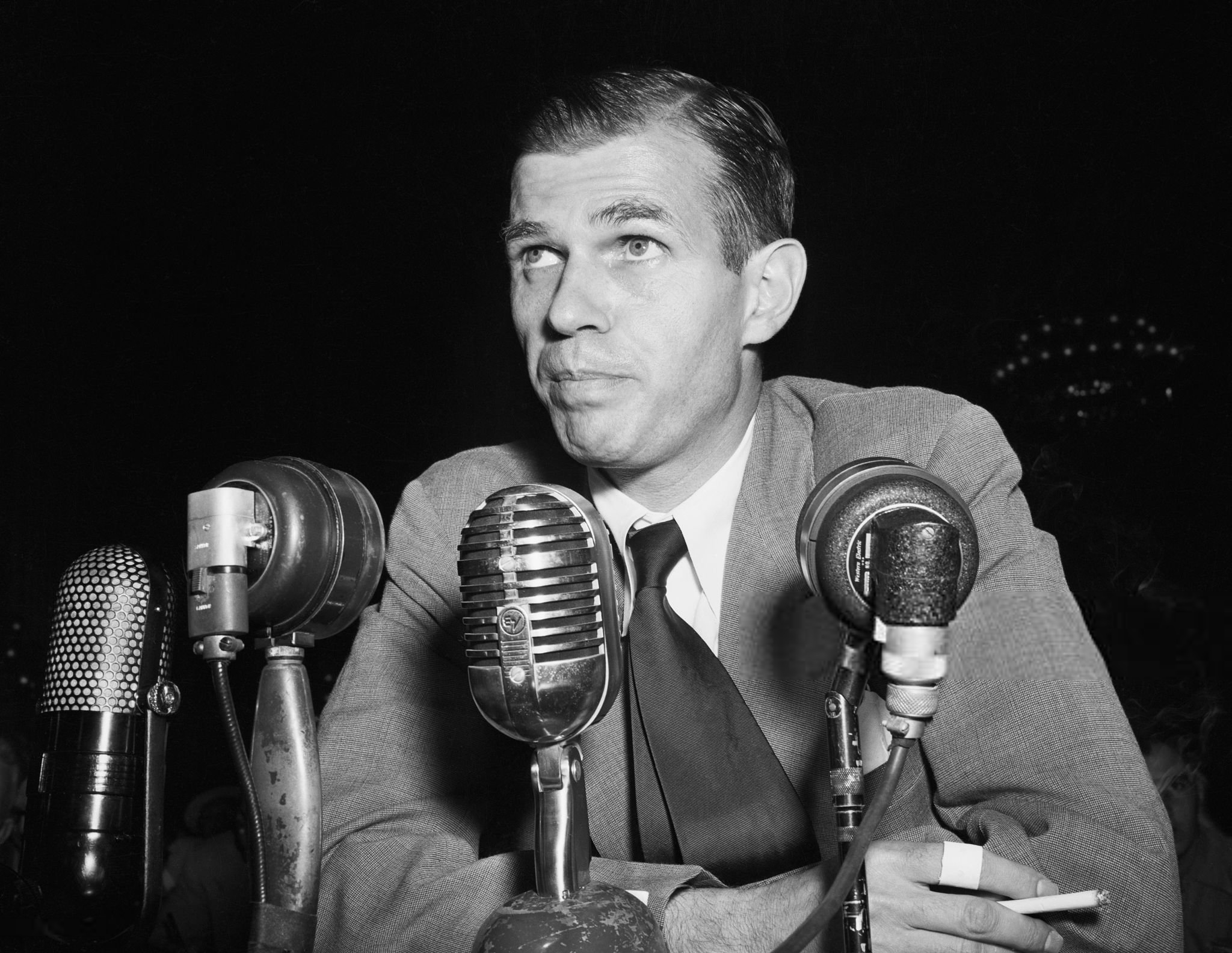
Alger Hiss in 1948

On August 7, 1948, Draper, then Undersecretary of War, requested that William L. Marbury Jr. fly to Geneva, Switzerland, and spend a month there to help the U.S. negotiate the General Agreement on Tariffs and Trade (GATT). Marbury was a close friend of Alger Hiss. Draper's request came days after Whittaker Chambers had included Hiss's name among those of government spies in the Ware Group during Chambers' testimony under subpoena before the House Committee on Un-American Activities (HCUA). In effect, the request prevented Marbury from helping during Hiss's further HCUA testimony in August and into September, when Hiss was considering a libel suit against Chambers for statements made August 27 on NBC Radio's nationwide Meet the Press broadcast.

=== Later career ===
After retiring from public service a second time, he traveled to Mexico City to serve as chairman of the Mexican Light and Power Company. Returning to the U.S. in 1959, he formed the first West Coast venture capital firm Draper, Gaither and Anderson in California.

In 1967, he retired from Draper Gaither, moved to Washington, D.C., and joined Combustion Engineering in New York as chairman, retiring a few years later to become the U.S. delegate to the United Nations Population Commission, serving from 1969 to 1971. He also cofounded the Population Crisis Committee in 1965 and chaired the Draper Committee.

== Personal life ==
On September 7, 1918, Draper was married to Katherine Louise Baum, a daughter of George Baum of Yonkers, New York. Before her death in 1942, they were the parents of three children, including:

- Dorothy Draper (1920–2017), a graduate of DePauw University who married Lt. James R. Wagner, USNR, who was killed In action in the European theatre of World War II. She joined WAVES and later married Phillips Hawkins in 1947.
- Katherine Louise Draper (1922–2021), also a graduate of DePauw University who married George Dow Haimbaugh Jr. in 1960.
- William Henry Draper III (1928–2026), a venture capitalist who was the founder of Sutter Hill Ventures.

On March 12, 1949, he remarried to Eunice Barzynski, a daughter of Brig.-Gen. Joseph E. Barzynski.

Draper died on December 26, 1974, of a heart attack in Naples, Florida. After a funeral in Fort Myer, he was buried at Arlington National Cemetery.

=== Descendants ===
Through his son William, he was the grandfather of actress Polly Draper and venture capitalist Timothy C. Draper who founded Draper Fisher Jurvetson. Through his grandson Timothy, he was a great-grandfather of venture capitalist and television personality Jesse Draper. Through his granddaughter Polly, he was a great-grandfather of Nat Wolff and Alex Wolff, who are both actors and musicians.

== See also ==
- George C. Marshall
- Alger Hiss
- William L. Marbury Jr.
- Dillon, Read & Co.
- Allied Control Council

Political offices
Preceded by Kenneth Royall	United States Under Secretary of War; August 29, 1947–September 17, 1947	Succeeded by Himself as United States Under Secretary of the Army
Preceded by New Office	United States Under Secretary of the Army; September 18, 1947–February 28, 1949	Succeeded by Gordon Gray
Business positions
Preceded by David E. Smucker and H.L. Delatour	President of Long Island Rail Road; 1950–1951	Succeeded by William Wyer
Diplomatic posts
Preceded by New Office	United States Ambassador to the North Atlantic Treaty Organization; April 8, 1953–June 13, 1953	Succeeded by John Chambers Hughes
