= John Chambers Hughes =

American diplomat

2nd United States Ambassador to the North Atlantic Treaty Organization
- In office June 12, 1953 – April 20, 1955
- President: Dwight D. Eisenhower
- Preceded by: William Henry Draper Jr.
- Succeeded by: George Walbridge Perkins Jr.

Personal details
- Born: 1891
- Died: 1971 (aged 79–80)
- Education: Princeton University

John Chambers Hughes (1891–1971), was an American diplomat and the United States Permanent Representative to NATO from 12 June 1953 until 20 April 1955. A graduate of Princeton University, he was a close friend of CIA Director Allen Dulles. Hughes, a Wall Street financier, was the head of the New York bureau of the Office of Strategic Services during World War II.

== Notes ==
Diplomatic posts
Preceded by William Henry Draper Jr.	U.S. Ambassador to NATO; 12 June 1953 until 20 April 1955	Succeeded by George W. Perkins
