= The Merchant–Heeney Report =

The Merchant-Heeney report was written for the Canadian government by a former Canadian ambassador to the United States and a former American ambassador to Canada. The ambassadors were Livingston T. Merchant from the US and Arnold Heeney from Canada.

This report of 1964, studied the subject of bilateral relations occurring between the two countries. It emphasized consultation at a number of levels. The focus would be through foreign affairs departments and aimed at quiet diplomacy. It basically outlined the concept that Canada should accommodate the United States wishes as much as possible and negotiate the best position possible for itself in the process.

The report has gained and retained a certain notoriety in that elements within Canada see it as creating unacceptable sovereignty issues. As recently as 2003, the report was the subject of discussions within Canada in formulating Canadian diplomacy stances.
