= Livingston T. Merchant =

American diplomat (1903–1976)

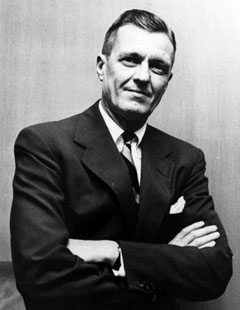

5th and 7th United States Ambassador to Canada
- In office March 15, 1961 – May 26, 1962
- President: John F. Kennedy
- Preceded by: Richard B. Wigglesworth
- Succeeded by: William Walton Butterworth
- In office May 23, 1956 – November 6, 1958
- President: Dwight D. Eisenhower
- Preceded by: R. Douglas Stuart
- Succeeded by: Richard B. Wigglesworth

Acting United States Secretary of State
- In office January 20, 1961 – January 21, 1961
- President: John F. Kennedy
- Preceded by: Christian Herter
- Succeeded by: Dean Rusk

2nd Under Secretary of State for Political Affairs
- In office December 4, 1959 – January 31, 1961
- President: Dwight D. Eisenhower; John F. Kennedy
- Preceded by: Robert D. Murphy
- Succeeded by: George C. McGhee

2nd and 4th Assistant Secretary of State for European Affairs
- In office November 18, 1958 – August 20, 1959
- President: Dwight D. Eisenhower
- Preceded by: Charles Burke Elbrick
- Succeeded by: Foy D. Kohler
- In office March 16, 1953 – May 6, 1956
- President: Dwight D. Eisenhower
- Preceded by: George Walbridge Perkins Jr.
- Succeeded by: Charles Burke Elbrick

Personal details
- Born: Livingston Tallmadge Merchant; November 23, 1903 New York City, New York, U.S.
- Died: May 15, 1976 (aged 72) Washington, D.C., U.S.
- Resting place: Oak Hill Cemetery
- Spouse: Elizabeth Stiles (m. 1927)
- Children: 3
- Parent(s): Huntington Wolcott Merchant; Mary Cornelia Tallmadge
- Education: Hotchkiss School
- Alma mater: Princeton University

Livingston Tallmadge Merchant (November 23, 1903 – May 15, 1976) was a United States official and diplomat. He twice served as United States ambassador to Canada and was Under Secretary for Political Affairs from 1959 to 1961.

== Early life ==
Merchant, who was nicknamed "Livy," was born in New York City on November 23, 1903. He was the son of Huntington Wolcott Merchant (c.1870–1918) and Mary Cornelia (née Tallmadge) Merchant, who lived at 1172 Park Avenue in New York City. His sister was Elizabeth Wolcott "Betty" Merchant (b. 1902), who married Philip Gallatin Cammann.

He was a descendant on his father's side of Oliver Wolcott Jr., the second Secretary of the Treasury under George Washington following Alexander Hamilton. Through his mother, he was descended from Sir Thomas Tallmadge, who emigrated to the colonies in 1632, Benjamin Tallmadge, and Gen. William Floyd, a signer of the Declaration of Independence. His maternal grandparents were Chester Livingston Tallmadge and Fanny Amelia Hamilton.

Merchant was educated at the Hotchkiss School in 1922, where his classmates included Charles W. Yost and Paul Nitze, and Princeton in 1926, where he was a member of the University Cottage Club and the Board of Trustees of Princeton University.

== Career ==
He joined Scudder Stevens and Clark, an investment counselling firm. He became a general partner in 1930.

Following his successful business career, Merchant joined the Government in 1942 following the attack on Pearl Harbor and moved up in the U.S. Department of State during the height of the Cold War. In 1949, when the Chiang Kai-shek regime collapsed, Merchant was in Nanking, China to assist. In the early 1950s, he served as Deputy Assistant Secretary of State for Far Eastern Affairs (under Dean Rusk who served as Assistant Secretary for Far Eastern Affairs and Dean Acheson, then US Secretary of State) in the Truman administration. He was twice appointed as Assistant Secretary of State for European Affairs. In 1959, he was appointed Under Secretary of State for Political Affairs, succeeding his former boss, Robert Daniel Murphy.

He was appointed U.S. Ambassador to Canada under Presidents Dwight D. Eisenhower and John F. Kennedy. In 1961, while Ambassador, President Kennedy appointed Merchant as his personal representative to negotiate the border dispute between Afghanistan and Pakistan.

Merchant served as Acting Secretary of State in January, 1961.

In 1964, he co-authored the Merchant-Heeney Report which examined bilateral relations between Canada and the United States. In his obituary in The New York Times, Merchant was described by the late Secretary of State John Foster Dulles and the late President Eisenhower as "the ideal of a Foreign Service officer."

=== Later work ===
In 1963, he was a director of the Glen Falls Insurance Company. From August 11, 1965, to October 31, 1968, he was executive director of the International Bank for Reconstruction and Development. Also in 1968, he was awarded an honorary doctorate by Harvard University that cited "in a long career, this discerning diplomat has advanced the interests of our country with faithfulness and distinction."

== Personal life ==
On December 11, 1927, Merchant was married to Elizabeth Stiles (b. 1904) at the Bethlehem Chapel at the Washington National Cathedral. She was the daughter of Dr. Charles Wardell Stiles and Virginia Baker Stiles and the granddaughter of Lewis Baker, who served as President of the West Virginia Senate, and U.S. Ambassador to Nicaragua, Costa Rica and El Salvador. Together, they were the parents of a son and two daughters:

- Rev. Livingston T. Merchant Jr.
- Elizabeth Gerard Merchant, who married Charles R. Leutz. They divorced and she married William Tyson, grandson of George Tyson, former president of the Burlington and Missouri Railroad, in 1956
- Mary Gerard Merchant, a Bryn Mawr College graduate who married Robert Wrenn Jasperson (1928–2005), the former executive director of Conservation Law Society and the general counsel of Save the Redwoods League. They divorced and she remarried to Harry Jack Sturgeon (1931–2010).

Merchant died of heart failure in Washington, DC on May 15, 1976. He was buried at Oak Hill Cemetery in Washington, D.C.

=== Descendants ===
Through his daughter Mary, he was the grandfather of Robert Merchant Jasperson and Leslie Wrenn Jasperson Tesei.

Government offices
Preceded by George Walbridge Perkins, Jr.	Assistant Secretary of State for European Affairs; March 16, 1953 – May 6, 1956	Succeeded by Charles Burke Elbrick
Preceded by Charles Burke Elbrick	Assistant Secretary of State for European Affairs; November 18, 1958 – August 20, 1959	Succeeded by Foy D. Kohler
Preceded by Robert Daniel Murphy	Under Secretary of State for Political Affairs; December 4, 1959 – January 31, 1961	Succeeded by George C. McGhee
Diplomatic posts
Preceded by R. Douglas Stuart	United States Ambassador to Canada; May 23, 1956 – November 6, 1958	Succeeded by Richard B. Wigglesworth
Preceded by Richard B. Wigglesworth	United States Ambassador to Canada; March 15, 1961 – May 26, 1962	Succeeded by William Walton Butterworth
