= Robert P. Patterson =

American judge (1891–1952)

- Portrait, c. 1945

55th United States Secretary of War
- In office September 27, 1945 – July 18, 1947
- President: Harry S. Truman
- Preceded by: Henry L. Stimson
- Succeeded by: Kenneth Claiborne Royall

United States Under Secretary of War
- In office December 16, 1940 – September 27, 1945
- President: Franklin D. Roosevelt; Harry S. Truman
- Preceded by: Office established
- Succeeded by: Kenneth Claiborne Royall

Judge of the United States Court of Appeals for the Second Circuit
- In office March 21, 1939 – July 30, 1940
- Appointed by: Franklin D. Roosevelt
- Preceded by: Martin Thomas Manton
- Succeeded by: Jerome Frank

Judge of the United States District Court for the Southern District of New York
- In office May 13, 1930 – March 22, 1939
- Appointed by: Herbert Hoover
- Preceded by: Thomas D. Thacher
- Succeeded by: Simon H. Rifkind

Personal details
- Born: Robert Porter Patterson; February 12, 1891 Glen Falls, New York, U.S.
- Died: January 22, 1952 (aged 60) Elizabeth, New Jersey, U.S.
- Resting place: Arlington National Cemetery
- Party: Republican
- Spouse: Margaret Winchester Patterson
- Children: 4, including Robert P. Patterson Jr.
- Education: Union College (AB); Harvard University (LLB)

Military service
- Allegiance: United States
- Branch/service: United States Army
- Years of service: 1917–1919
- Rank: Major
- Unit: 306th Infantry Regiment
- Battles/wars: World War I
- Awards: Distinguished Service Cross; Distinguished Service Medal; Silver Star

Robert Porter Patterson Sr. (February 12, 1891 – January 22, 1952) was an American judge who served as Under Secretary of War under President Franklin D. Roosevelt and U.S. Secretary of War under President Harry S. Truman. He was a US circuit judge of the United States Court of Appeals for the Second Circuit after he had been a district judge of the United States District Court for the Southern District of New York.

== Education and career ==
Born on February 12, 1891, in Glens Falls, New York, the son of Lodice Edna (née Porter) and Charles Robert Patterson, Patterson received an Artium Baccalaureus degree in 1912 from Union College and a Bachelor of Laws in 1915 from Harvard Law School. He entered private practice in New York City from 1915 to 1916, with what today is the law firm of Patterson Belknap Webb & Tyler, also serving with that firm in subsequent periods of private practice. He served in the New York Army National Guard from 1916 to 1917. He served in the United States Army from 1917 to 1919, attaining the rank of Major. He received the Distinguished Service Cross and Silver Star for heroism in France. Patterson served in the 306th Infantry Regiment which was assigned to the 77th Infantry Division. He returned to private practice in New York City from 1919 to 1930.

== Federal judicial service ==
Patterson was nominated by President Herbert Hoover on April 24, 1930, to a seat on the United States District Court for the Southern District of New York vacated by Judge Thomas D. Thacher. He was confirmed by the United States Senate on May 13, 1930, and received his commission the same day. His service terminated on March 22, 1939, due to his elevation to the Second Circuit.

Patterson was nominated by President Franklin D. Roosevelt on February 9, 1939, to a seat on the United States Court of Appeals for the Second Circuit vacated by Judge Martin Thomas Manton. He was confirmed by the Senate on March 20, 1939, and received his commission on March 21, 1939. His service terminated on July 30, 1940, due to his resignation.

== War Department service ==
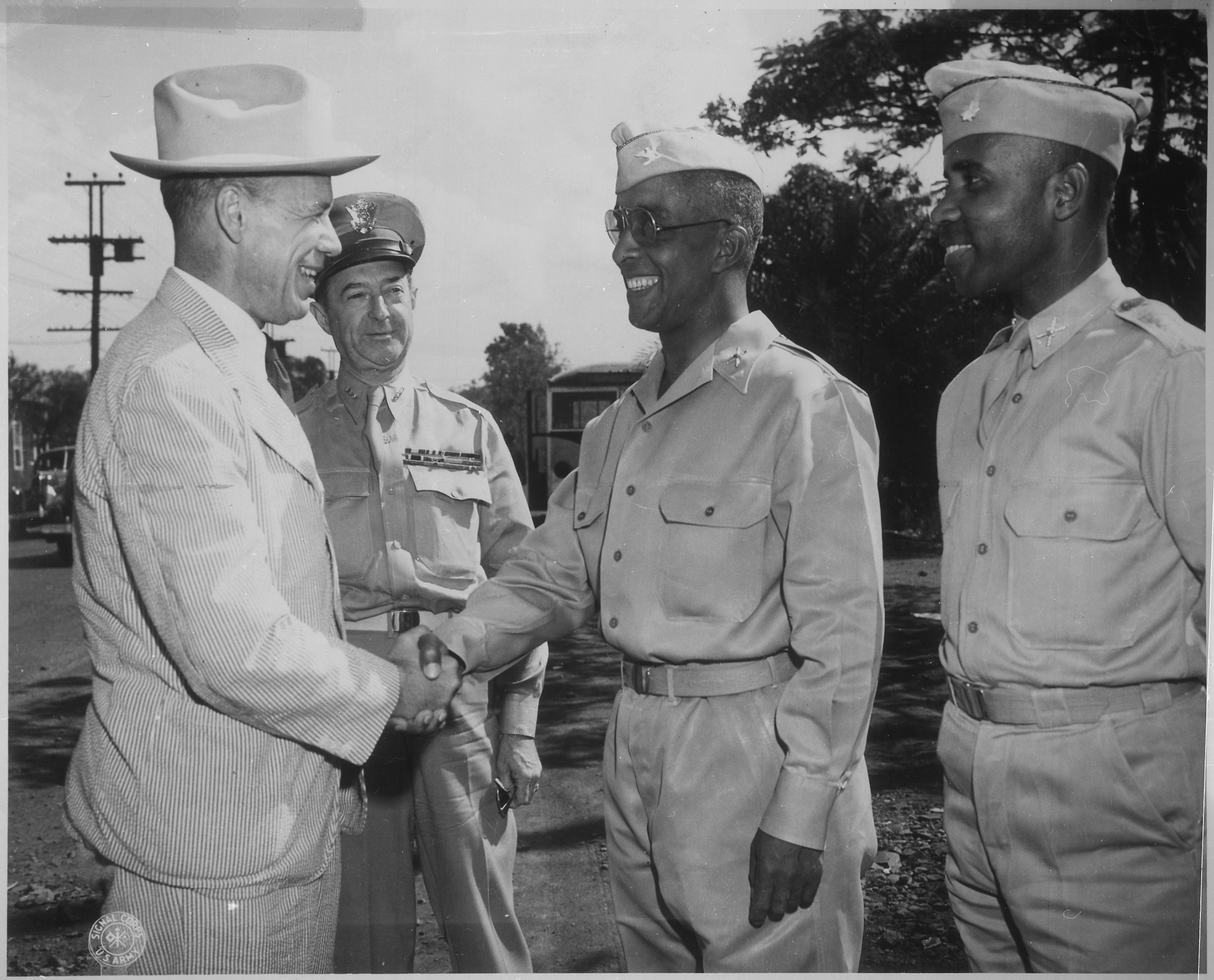
Patterson congratulating Col. Chauncey M. Hooper in Hawaii, 1943.

Patterson served as a United States Assistant Secretary of War in 1940. He served as United States Under Secretary of War from 1940 to 1945 under Secretary Henry L. Stimson. He was instrumental in the mobilization of the armed forces preparatory to and during World War II. President Harry S. Truman appointed Patterson as United States Secretary of War in 1945. Truman initially was set to offer Patterson a seat on the United States Supreme Court which was left vacant by Justice Owen J. Roberts, however, with the resignation of Henry L. Stimson, Patterson instead became the Secretary of War. Patterson advocated unifying the armed services (army and navy) and having a single chief of staff. Steps to this effect were begun by the National Security Act of 1947 and revised several times, finally by the Goldwater-Nichols Act of 1986.

Patterson worked to promote more black participation and promotion with in the military, specifically during the late stages of World War II. He was instrumental in creating an African-American fighter group, known now as the Tuskegee airmen. While sympathetic to black grievances, aspirations, and recommendations he was concerned that radical change would impede military preparedness during war. After the war the "Board for Utilization of Negro Manpower" (or Gillem Board). released a report, "Utilization of Negro Manpower in the Postwar Army Policy", in April 1946. that was signed off by Patterson: it recommended the retention of segregation, as that was a policy external to the military, but that the military introduce equal opportunity, as that would be the best use of military manpower. Patterson served until 1947.

== Later career ==
After declining an offer by President Truman to be reappointed to his former judgeship, Patterson returned to private practice in New York City from 1947 to 1952. Later he became the President of the Association of the Bar of the City of New York, and the President of the Council on Foreign Relations. Governor Thomas E. Dewey appointed Patterson along with New York City’s construction coordinator Robert Moses and former Justice Charles C. Lockwood as a member of the Temporary Long Island Railroad Commission, installed after the Richmond Hill train crash on November 22, 1950, that claimed 79 lives. The Commission recommended the state purchase and operation by non-profit public authority of the railway service.

== Personal life ==
On January 3, 1920, Patterson married Margaret Tarleton Winchester (1897–1988); they had four children: Robert P. Patterson, Jr., Aileen Patterson Seldes, Susan H. Patterson and Virginia Patterson Montgomery. Robert P. Patterson Jr. was a federal judge in the Southern District of New York from 1988 until his death in 2015.

== Death ==
Patterson died on January 22, 1952, returning from meeting a client, onboard American Airlines Flight 6780 which crashed on the approach to Newark Airport in Elizabeth, New Jersey; he was age 60.

== Works ==
In 2012, the University of Tennessee Press published The World War I Memoirs of Robert P. Patterson: A Captain in the Great War, edited by J. Garry Clifford.

In 2014, the University of Tennessee Press published his previously unpublished 1947 memoir Arming the Nation for War, with a foreword by Robert M. Morgenthau, former Manhattan district attorney, and edited by Brian Waddell, associate professor at the University of Connecticut.

- The World War I Memoirs of Robert P. Patterson: A Captain in the Great War (2012)
- Arming the Nation for War: Mobilization, Supply, and the American War Effort in World War II (2014)

== Legacy ==
In 1953, Union College named liberal arts scholarships in the memory of Patterson. An army reserve building on the Bronx campus of New York University was named after Patterson in 1953.

== Sources ==
- Eiler, Keith. (1997) Mobilizing America: Robert P. Patterson and the War Effort, 1940–1945. Cornell University Press.

Legal offices
Preceded by Thomas D. Thacher	Judge of the United States District Court for the Southern District of New York; 1930–1939	Succeeded by Simon H. Rifkind
Preceded by Martin Thomas Manton	Judge of the United States Court of Appeals for the Second Circuit; 1939–1940	Succeeded by Jerome Frank
Political offices
Preceded by Office established	United States Under Secretary of War; 1940–1945	Succeeded by Kenneth Claiborne Royall
Preceded by Henry L. Stimson	United States Secretary of War; 1945–1947	Succeeded by Kenneth Claiborne Royall
