= United States Mission to NATO =

The United States Mission to NATO (USNATO) is the official representation of the United States to the North Atlantic Treaty Organization. It is located at NATO Headquarters in the City of Brussels, Belgium. The mission includes individuals representing numerous U.S. federal agencies. The U.S. ambassador to NATO is officially called the permanent representative to NATO. The incumbent representative is Matthew Whitaker.

== See also ==
- List of United States permanent representatives to NATO
- History of NATO § 2024–present: American detachment from NATO
- Withdrawal from NATO § United States
