= Thomas K. Finletter (judge) =

American judge

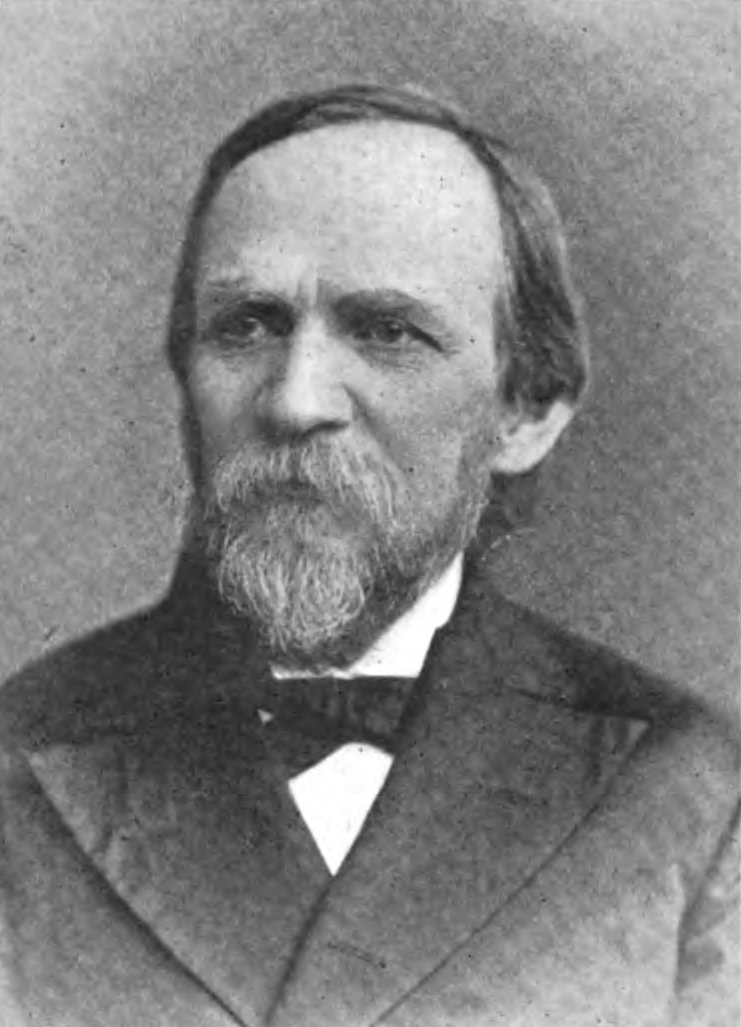
Thomas K. Finletter

Thomas Knight Finletter (December 31, 1821 – April 1, 1907) was a judge of the Court of the Common Pleas in Pennsylvania. His grandson was Thomas K. Finletter. The Thomas K. Finletter School was named for him.
