= Glynwood Center for Regional Food and Farming =

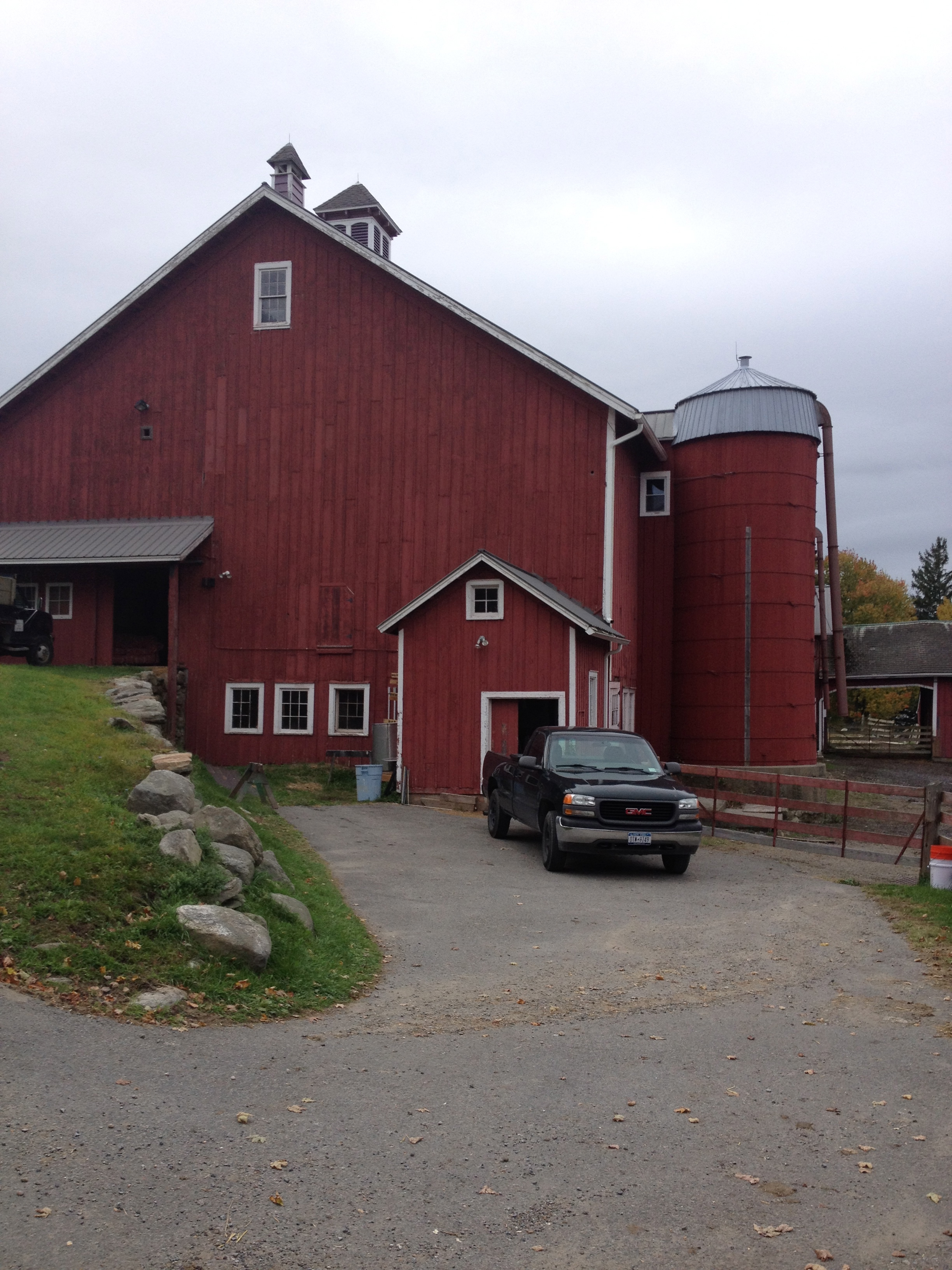
- Glynwood
- Website: www.glynwood.org

The Glynwood Center for Regional Food and Farming, also known as Glynwood, is a nonprofit organization in Cold Spring, New York. Its mission is to help save farming in the Northeast, particularly the Hudson Valley, by strengthening farm communities and regional food systems. Located in the Hudson Valley, the Glynwood Center strives to get small- and mid-sized farmers to thrive.

== Overview ==
A non-profit organization, Glynwood finds it important to have a healthier regional food system, help the economy, conserve the natural environment, and promote a sense of place. They make it their mission to ensure that farming thrives in the Hudson Valley by developing and implementing core programs that enhance the viability of farming in our region. Currently, Glynwood's vision is "a Hudson Valley defined by food: where farmers prosper, food entrepreneurs succeed, residents are nourished and visitors are inspired."

Glynwood works their own farmland, testing, innovating and teaching techniques that demonstrate the economic viability of sustainable farming practices. Glynwood runs three core programs alongside its working farm. A few projects they have are The Cider Project, dedicated to preserving the apple orchards in the Hudson Valley by promoting the production of hard cider and apple spirits, the Hudson Valley Farm Business Incubator, in New Paltz, New York, and Keep Farming Program, devoted to empowering communities to save farming, and others.

Glynwood serves as place where community leaders can seek information, support, and training on sustainable farming. Glynwood consists of different programs to promote their mission to "save farming by strengthening farm communities and regional food systems", the farm and a think tank that seeks innovative ways to sustainable farming.

== History ==
In 1929, financier George Walbridge Perkins Jr. and his family purchased land located in the Hudson Highlands now called Glynwood Farm. Mr. Perkins was a noted conservationist and his father George Walbridge Perkins was one of the creators of the Palisades Interstate Park Commission, which to date has conserved over 100,000 acres of parklands and historic sites. The name of the farm uses a combination of Mr. and Mrs. Perkins' first names, George and Lynn. Mr. Perkins' father's involvement in the Palisades Interstate Park Commission inspired the deep thought and conservation ethic that made Glynwood Farm more than just a farm.

After the death of the owners, their family preserved Glynwood Farm, making it the site of a "not-for-profit organization dedicated to rural conservation". In 1995, the Open Space Institute purchased Glynwood Farm, a 957-acre estate, in an effort to preserve one of the last untouched woodlands in the lower Hudson River Valley. In this $6.25 million purchase, more than 700 acres of the purchase were added to the adjacent Clarence Fahnestock State Park, completing the effort by the Open Space Institute to "expand the protected lands in the Hudson Highlands" a mountain range bisected by the Hudson River. The purchase was made with a grant provided by the Lila Bell Wallace and DeWitt Wallace Fund for the Hudson Highlands through a trust set up in 1983 to preserve unspoiled parts of the Hudson Valley by the founders of Reader's Digest. The 230-acre core of the estate, of cow pastures, farms and houses, remained a farm and became Glynwood Center.

In 1997, the Glynwood Center adopted the Countryside Exchange Program, a program introduced by the Countryside Institute. This program brought together international teams of volunteer professionals to work with communities on their most important issues, typically those that center on conservation and economic development. Communities would apply to participate in the Countryside Exchange and were chosen based on their depth of interest within the community, existing leadership and leadership skills, and the diversity of community members supporting the application. Once selected, the community would form a Local Organizing Committee (LOC) which would the implement the Exchange Team's suggestions based on their weekly report which consisted of its observations and ideas. The Countryside Exchanges, although not used anymore, still continues to provide the intellectual underpinnings for Glynwood's mission and programs.

== Outreach ==
=== Glynwood Farm ===
Glynwood's farm is located at its headquarters in Cold Spring, New York where they work with vegetable crops and livestock. The farm serves as a way for Glynwood to convey their mission by "testing, innovation, and demonstrating sustainable practices, while also growing food" for their community. Glynwood does this through their use of Conservation Goat Grazing and energy efficient farming. Conservation Goat Grazing is an innovative practice used by the farm which uses goats to eat any invasive shrub like the Multiflora Rose in effort to provide their sheep and cattle with usable pasture. Glynwood Farm also practices energy efficient farming through the use of an innovative radiant heating system in their greenhouse, electric tractors, and draft horses that help eliminate air pollution. Apart from practicing energy efficient farming, the Glynwood Farm also offers an apprentice program through the Collaborative Regional Alliance for Farmer Training that educates and provides a hands on experience for individuals interested in farming. The Glynwood farm sells their products through CSA shares, a farm store located on site, and online.

=== Community Initiatives ===
Glynwood is composed of different core programs apart from the farm that fulfill their mission to promote sustainable farming. The Keep Farming program is a program aimed at helping communities strengthen their farm economy, protect their farmland and open space and prepare these communities for their future in farming. Glynwood's Keep Farming initiative has successfully helped communities in New York like Northampton. The Cider Project is a program in which Glynwood aims to increase profits, enhance production, and expand markets for apple orchards in the Hudson Valley. Through the Cider Project program, Glynwood is preserving apple orchards in the Hudson Valley by promoting hard cider and apple spirits. Glynwood launched Cider Week in effort to not only work directly with the apple producers but also restaurants and bars. Another program Glynwood offers is the Harvest Awards. Through this program Glynwood presents awards to "individuals and organizations from across the country that do an exceptional job of supporting local and regional agriculture and increases access to fresh, healthy food." Glynwood and the Hudson Valley CSA Coalition launched CSA is a SNAP in the spring of 2020, supported by a 2019 Gus Schumacher Nutrition Incentive Program (GusNIP) pilot project grant (USDA-NIFA Award No. 2019-70030-30397).

In April 2025, Glynwood launched the Hudson Valley Farm Relief Fund in response to widespread federal funding cuts impacting regional farmers. The initiative supports farms across 11 counties in the Hudson Valley.

== See also ==
- Farmers' market
- List of organic gardening and farming topics
