= George Walbridge Perkins Jr. =

American diplomat

3rd United States Permanent Representative to NATO
- In office March 14, 1955 – October 12, 1957
- President: Dwight D. Eisenhower
- Preceded by: John Chambers Hughes
- Succeeded by: Warren Randolph Burgess

1st Assistant Secretary of State for European Affairs
- In office August 1, 1949 – January 31, 1953
- President: Harry S. Truman; Dwight D. Eisenhower
- Preceded by: Position established
- Succeeded by: Livingston T. Merchant

Personal details
- Born: May 2, 1895 Bronx, New York, U.S.
- Died: January 11, 1960 (aged 64) Manhattan, New York, U.S.
- Party: Republican

George Walbridge Perkins II (May 2, 1895 – January 11, 1960) was an American diplomat. He served as the Assistant Secretary of State for European Affairs from 1949 to 1953 and the United States Permanent Representative to NATO from 1955 to 1957.

== Life and career ==
He was born on May 2, 1895, to George Walbridge Perkins. He graduated from Princeton in 1917, where he worked to abolish eating clubs. In 1921, he married Linn Merck, the daughter of George W. Merck. and in 1925, his son George Walbridge Perkins III (1925–2008) was born. He worked at Merck & Co., Inc. from 1927 to 1948. In 1950, he successfully persuaded Congress to assist Josip Broz Tito in his defiance of the Stalin regime. Perkins died of a heart attack in Manhattan on January 11, 1960.

== See also ==
- Glynwood Center

Government offices
| Preceded by New Office | Assistant Secretary of State for European Affairs; August 1, 1949 – January 31, 1953 | Succeeded by Livingston T. Merchant |
