= Adirondack Iron and Steel Company =

Historic ironworks complex in New York, US

- U.S. National Register of Historic Places
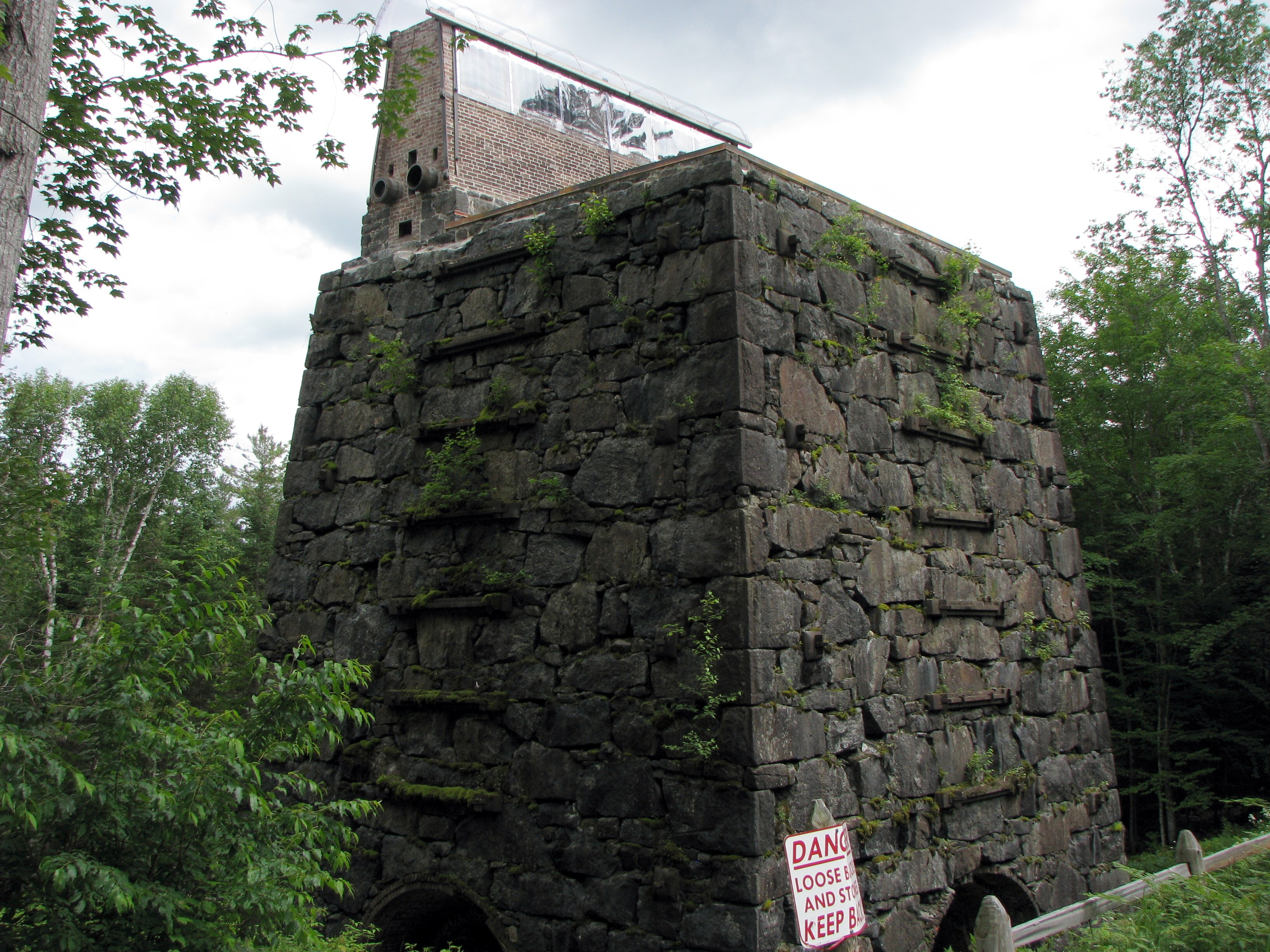
- Ruins of the 1854 Blast Furnace, July 2008

- Location within New York Location within the United States
- Location: Upper Works Rd., near Tahawus, New York
- Coordinates: 44°4′41″N 74°3′22″W
- Area: 809 acres (327 ha)
- Built: 1854
- NRHP reference No.: 77000940
- Added to NRHP: October 5, 1977

Adirondack Iron and Steel Company is a historic ironworks complex located at Tahawus in Essex County, New York. It consists of the remains of the "Upper Works" iron foundry that date back to 1826. Iron from the site was contaminated with titanium, which, together with its isolation, made for an unprofitable venture.

The blast furnace at the site rises 45 feet (14 m) from its base, 10 feet higher than the previous 1844 furnace and allowing for more output. However, the furnace was nearly obsolete upon its completion in 1854, as ironworks were transitioning to larger stacks fueled by anthracite, while the Tahawus ironworks continued to user charcoal as fuel.

It was listed on the National Register of Historic Places in 1977.
