= Thomas K. Finletter School =

- U.S. National Register of Historic Places
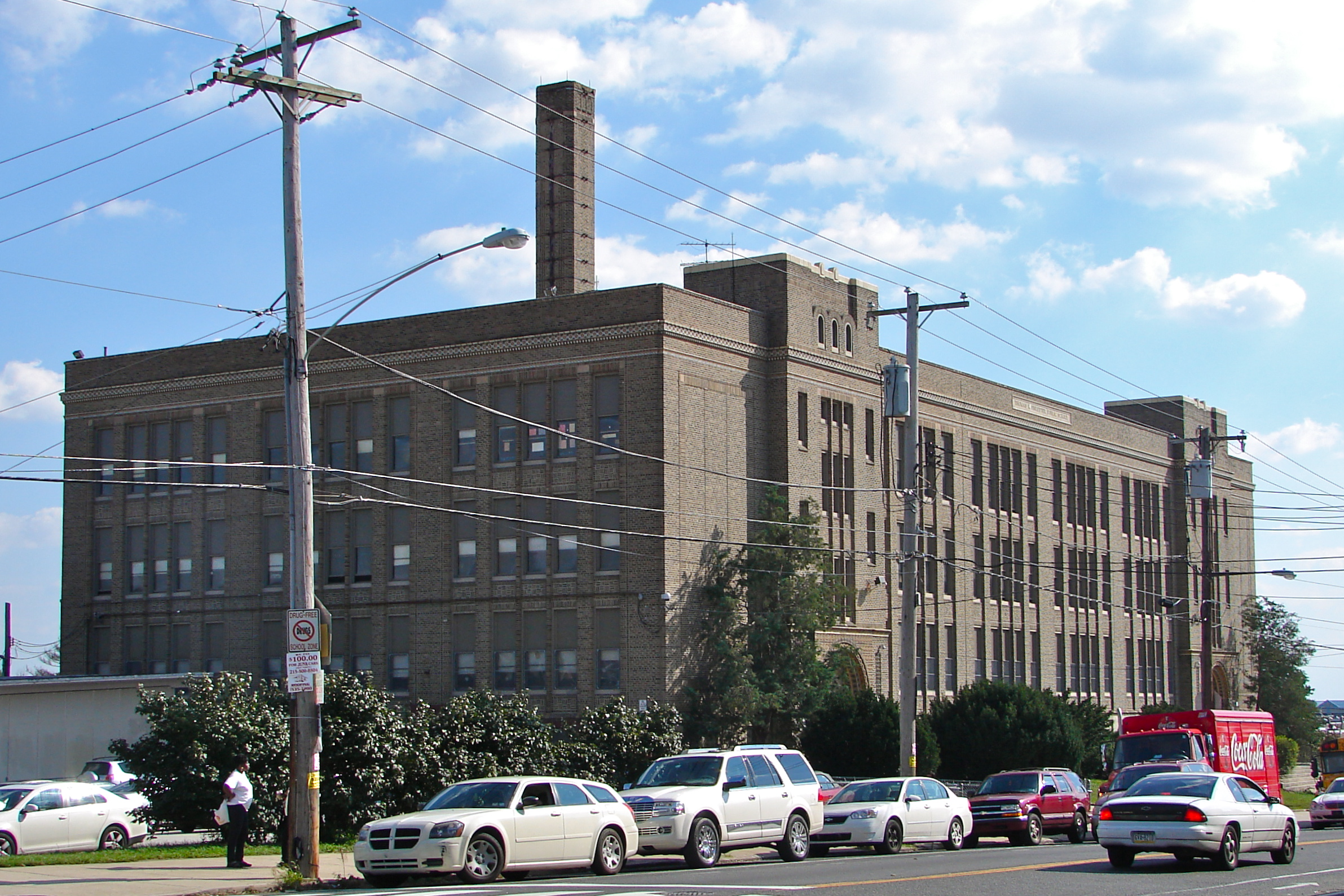
- Thomas K. Finletter School, October 2010

- Location within Philadelphia Location within Pennsylvania Location within the United States
- Location: 6101 N. Front St., Philadelphia, Pennsylvania
- Coordinates: 40°2′37″N 75°7′10″W
- Area: 3 acres (1.2 ha)
- Built: 1929–1930
- Architect: Irwin T. Catharine
- Architectural style: Art Deco
- MPS: Philadelphia Public Schools TR
- NRHP reference No.: 88002271
- Added to NRHP: November 18, 1988

The Thomas K. Finletter Academics Plus School is a historic, American school in the Olney neighborhood of Philadelphia, Pennsylvania. It is part of the School District of Philadelphia.

It was added to the National Register of Historic Places in 1988.

== History and architectural features ==
This historic building was designed by Irwin T. Catharine and built between 1929 and 1930. It is a three-story, eight-bay, yellow brick building that sits on a raised basement. Created in the Art Deco style, it features a colorful arched entryway with terra cotta trim and terra cotta panels. It was named for the judge Thomas K. Finletter.
