= Open Space Institute =

Conservation organization

The Open Space Institute (OSI) is an American conservation organization that protects land for clean drinking water, public recreation, healthy communities, wildlife habitat, and climate protection. Established in 1974, OSI achieves its goals through land acquisition, fiscal sponsorship, regional loan and grant programs, park and trail improvements, and public policy and advocacy. OSI is active across the United States, including in the states of New York, Vermont, New Hampshire, Maine, Georgia, South Carolina, Virginia, Tennessee, New Jersey, Massachusetts, Pennsylvania, Alabama, West Virginia, North Carolina, and Florida.

== Activities ==
=== Funding ===
OSI provides grants and low-cost bridge loans to land trusts, other nonprofit groups, and public agencies for more effective and resilient land protection in selected regions of the eastern United States. OSI also provides financial awards for young leaders interested in pursuing conservation careers.

=== Land acquisition ===
OSI acquires and transfers land and conservation easements for permanent land protection. They work closely with local, state, and federal agencies to protect land for communities, wildlife and water. OSI aims to connect fragmented landscapes to protect wildlife habitat, expand recreational spaces, and preserve water quality.

=== Park improvements ===
OSI collaborates with public entities such as NY State Parks and the Department of Conservation to improve access to open spaces. OSI specializes in Greenway Trails, converting abandoned rail lines to multi-purpose trails. OSI also manages lands that they own in fee or easement.

=== Research ===
OSI conducts research and produces publications in different mediums to inform policymakers, other land trusts, and the public about the benefits of land protection, including the protection of natural resources in the face of climate change and improved access to outdoor spaces for under-resourced communities.

=== Grassroots efforts ===
OSI fiscally sponsors environmentally-focused grassroots organizations by providing financial and legal oversight. With OSI’s financial and legal oversight, these groups are eligible to receive grants and tax-deductible contributions and can focus on their programming and capacity-building. The participants have ranged from community gardens and land trusts, to environmental educators and promoters of nature-based arts and activities.

== See also ==
- Conservation movement
- Environmental protection
- Glynwood Center
- Habitat conservation
- List of environmental organizations
- New York - New Jersey Trail Conference
