= Richard B. Wigglesworth =

American politician

Richard Bowditch Wigglesworth
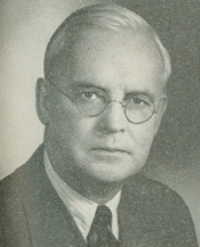

6th United States Ambassador to Canada
- In office December 15, 1958 – October 19, 1960
- President: Dwight D. Eisenhower
- Preceded by: Livingston T. Merchant
- Succeeded by: Livingston T. Merchant

Member of the U.S. House of Representatives from Massachusetts
- In office November 6, 1928 – November 13, 1958
- Preceded by: Louis A. Frothingham
- Succeeded by: James A. Burke
- Constituency: 14th district (1928–33); 13th district (1933–58)

Personal details
- Born: April 25, 1891 Boston, Massachusetts, U.S.
- Died: October 22, 1960 (aged 69) Boston, Massachusetts, U.S.
- Resting place: Arlington National Cemetery
- Party: Republican
- Education: Harvard University; Harvard Law School

Military service
- Allegiance: United States of America
- Branch/service: U.S. Army
- Years of service: 1917–1919
- Rank: Captain
- Unit: Seventy-sixth Division
- Commands: First Battalion, Three Hundred and Third Field Artillery, Seventy-sixth Division
- Battles/wars: World War I

Richard Bowditch "Dick" Wigglesworth (April 25, 1891 – October 22, 1960) was an American football player, coach, and United States representative from Massachusetts. He was born in Boston. He graduated from Milton Academy in 1908.

He attended Harvard University, where he was the starting quarterback for the Harvard Crimson football team from 1909 to 1911.

Wigglesworth graduated from Harvard in 1912, and from Harvard Law School in 1916. He also served as a graduate coach of the Harvard football team starting in 1912. He was assistant private secretary to the Governor General of the Philippine Islands. He was admitted to the bar and commenced practice in Boston.

During World War I he served overseas as captain, Battery E, and as commanding officer, First Battalion, Three Hundred and Third Field Artillery, Seventy-sixth Division, 1917–1919. He served as legal adviser to the Assistant Secretary of the Treasury in charge of foreign loans and railway payments, and secretary of the World War Debt Commission 1922–1924. He was assistant to the Agent General for Reparation Payments, Berlin, Germany 1924–1927. He was general counsel and Paris representative for organizations created under the Dawes plan in 1927 and 1928.

Wigglesworth was elected as a Republican to the Seventieth Congress to fill the vacancy caused by the death of Louis A. Frothingham. He was reelected to the Seventy-first and to the fourteen succeeding Congresses and served from November 6, 1928, until his resignation November 13, 1958. Wigglesworth voted in favor of the Civil Rights Act of 1957. He served as United States Ambassador to Canada from December 15, 1958, until his death in Boston on October 22, 1960. His interment was in Arlington National Cemetery.

Wigglesworth married Florence Joyes Booth in 1931, and they had three daughters, Ann, Mary and Jane.

== See also ==
- List of members of the American Legion

U.S. House of Representatives
| Preceded by Louis A. Frothingham | Member of the U.S. House of Representatives from Massachusetts's 14th congressional district November 6, 1928 – March 3, 1933 | Succeeded by Joseph William Martin Jr. |
| Preceded by Robert Luce | Member of the U.S. House of Representatives from Massachusetts's 13th congressional district March 4, 1933 – November 13, 1958 | Succeeded by James A. Burke |
Diplomatic posts
| Preceded by Livingston T. Merchant | United States Ambassador to Canada; January 28, 1959 – October 22, 1960 | Succeeded by Livingston T. Merchant |
