= United States Secretary of War =

Position in the US Cabinet from 1789 to 1947

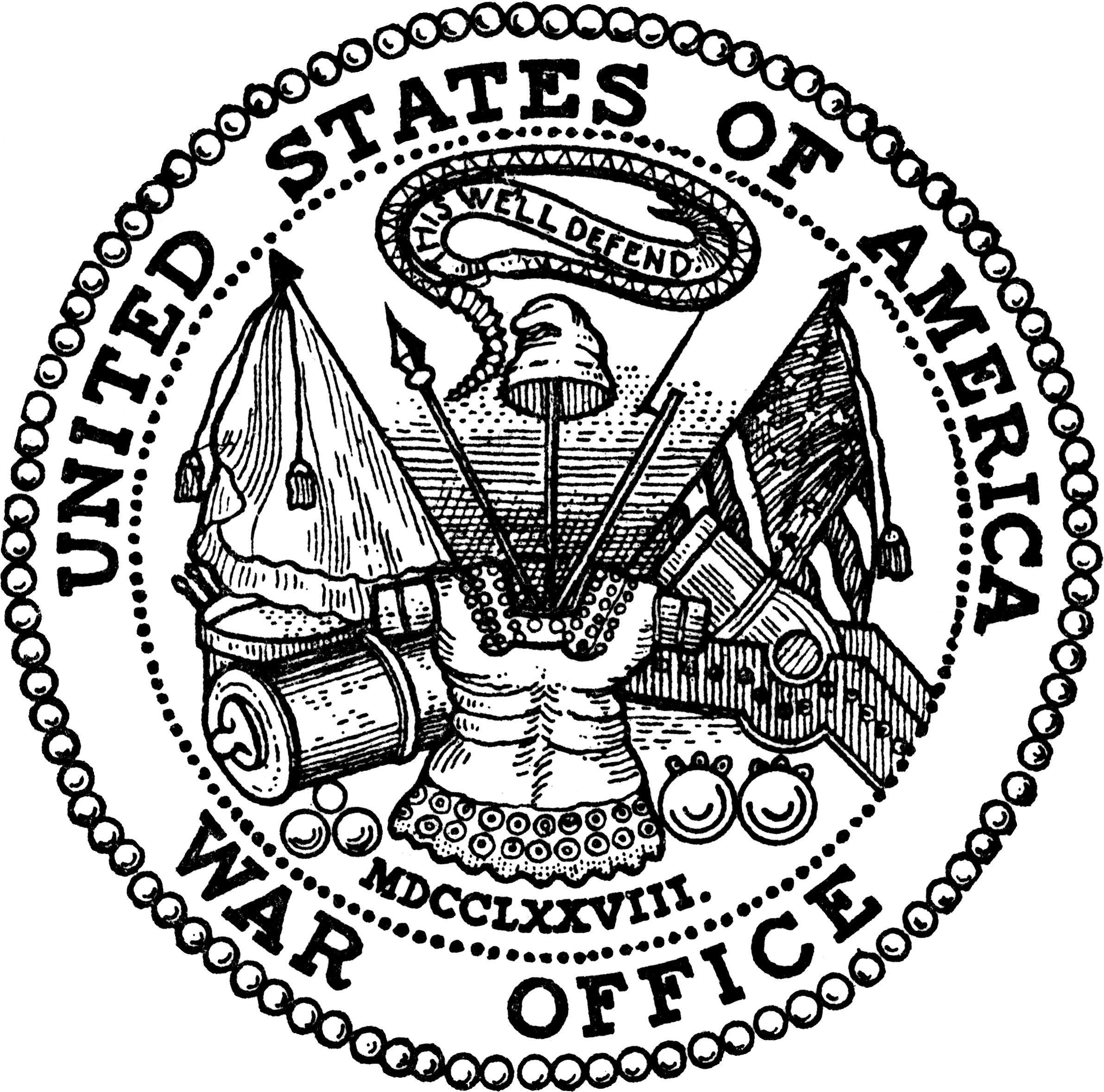
- Official seal

- Flag of the secretary

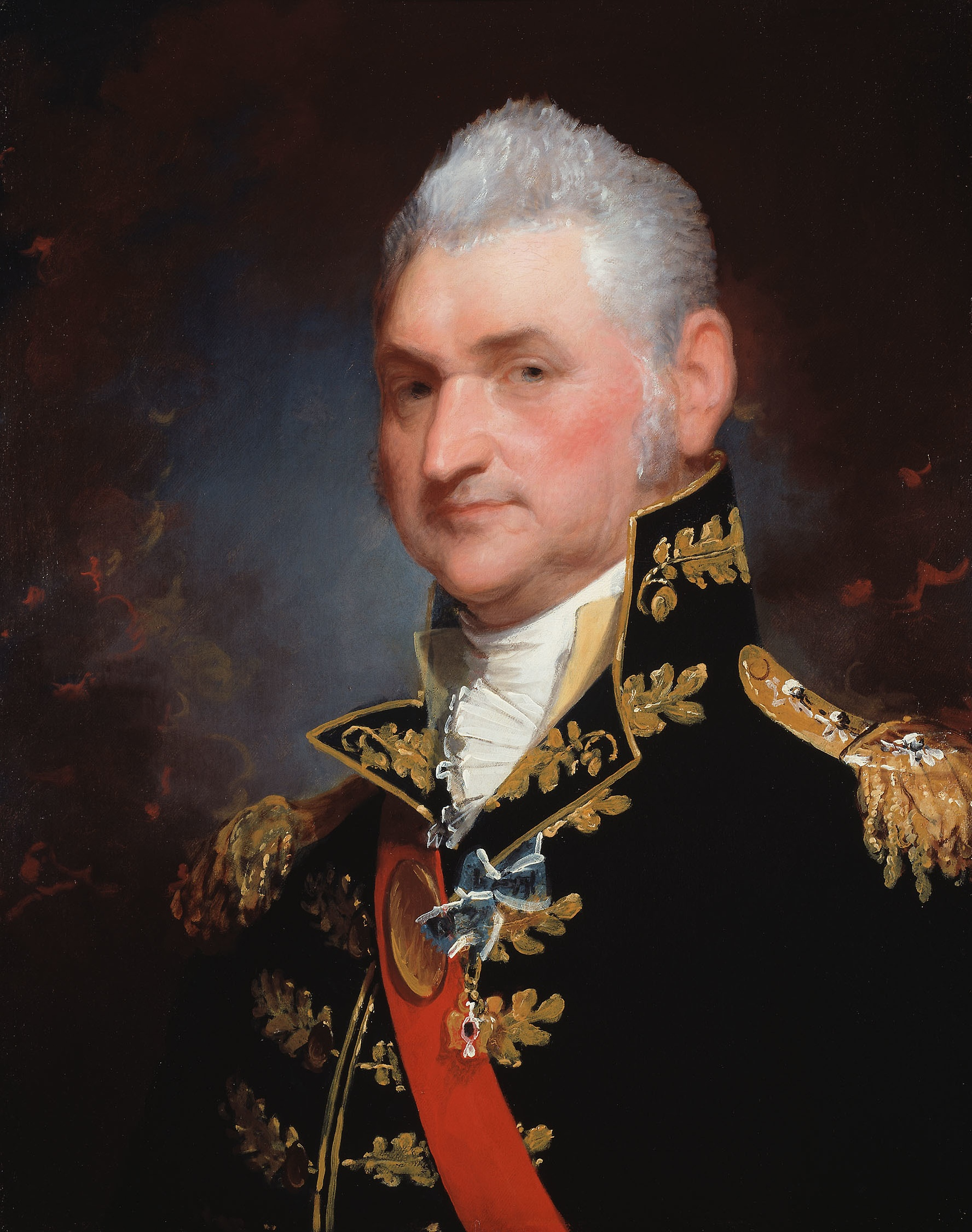
- Longest serving Henry Dearborn; March 5, 1801 – March 4, 1809
- United States Department of War
- Style: Mr. Secretary
- Type: Secretary
- Status: Abolished
- Member of: Cabinet
- Reports to: President of the United States
- Seat: Washington, D.C.
- Appointer: The president; with Senate advice and consent
- Term length: No fixed term
- Precursor: Secretary at War
- Formation: September 12, 1789
- First holder: Henry Knox
- Final holder: Kenneth C. Royall
- Abolished: September 18, 1947
- Superseded by: Secretary of Defense; Secretary of the Army; Secretary of the Air Force
- Succession: 6th in the line of succession

The secretary of war was a member of the U.S. Cabinet, beginning with George Washington's administration. A similar position, called either "Secretary at War" or "Secretary of War", had been appointed to serve the Congress of the Confederation under the Articles of Confederation between 1781 and 1789. Benjamin Lincoln and later Henry Knox held the position. When Washington was inaugurated as the first president under the Constitution, he appointed Knox to continue serving as secretary of war.

The secretary of war was the head of the War Department. At first, he was responsible for the United States Army and the Navy. In 1798, the secretary of the Navy was created by statute, and the scope of responsibility for the War Department was reduced to the Army. From 1886 onward, the secretary of war was in the line of succession to the presidency, after the vice president of the United States, the speaker of the House of Representatives, the president pro tempore of the Senate and the secretary of state.

In 1947, with the passing of the National Security Act of 1947, the secretary of war was replaced by the secretary of the Army and the secretary of the Air Force and a new secretary, the secretary of defense, was created for coordination of the services. Since 1949, the service secretaries, Army, Air Force, and Navy, have been non-Cabinet subordinates under the secretary of defense. The secretary of the Army's office is generally considered the direct successor to the secretary of war's office, with the new secretary of defense taking the secretaries of war and navy positions in the Cabinet, and the line of succession to the presidency.

== List of secretaries ==
=== Secretary at War (1781–1789) ===
The office of secretary at war was modeled upon Great Britain's secretary at war, who was William Barrington, 2nd Viscount Barrington, at the time of the American Revolution. The office of secretary at war was meant to replace both the commander-in-chief and the Board of War, and like the president of the board, the secretary wore no special insignia. The inspector general, quartermaster general, commissary general, and adjutant general served on the secretary's staff. However, the Army itself under Secretary Henry Knox only consisted of 700 men.

No.	Image	Name	Home State	Start	End	Appointer
1		Benjamin Lincoln (1733–1810)	Massachusetts	March 1, 1781	November 2, 1783	Congress of the Confederation
2		Henry Knox (1750–1806)	Massachusetts	March 8, 1785	September 12, 1789	Congress of the Confederation

=== Secretary of War (1789–1947) ===
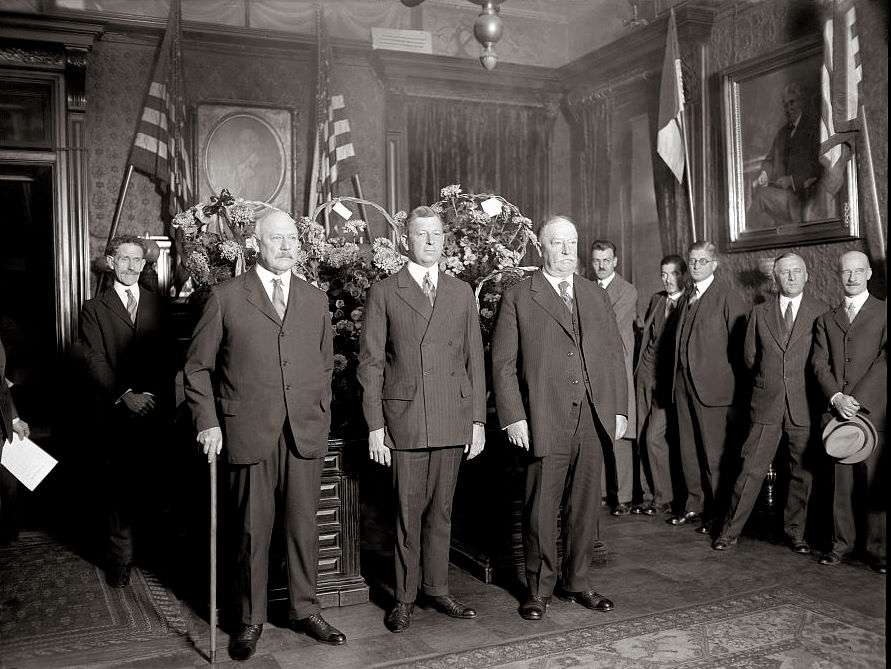
Swearing in of Dwight F. Davis as Secretary of War in 1925. Former secretaries John W. Weeks and Chief Justice William Howard Taft are standing beside him.

Parties

Federalist (4) Democratic-Republican (8) Democratic (14) Whig (5) Republican (25)

Denotes acting capacity.

No.	Image	Name	Start	End	Duration	Party	Home State	President(s)
1		Henry Knox	September 12, 1789	December 31, 1794	5 years, 110 days	Federalist	Massachusetts	George Washington (1789–1797)
2		Timothy Pickering	January 2, 1795	December 10, 1795	342 days	Federalist	Pennsylvania	George Washington (1789–1797)
3		James McHenry	January 27, 1796	June 1, 1800	4 years, 125 days	Federalist	Maryland	George Washington (1789–1797)
3		James McHenry	January 27, 1796	June 1, 1800	4 years, 125 days	Federalist	Maryland	John Adams (1797–1801)
4		Samuel Dexter	June 1, 1800	January 31, 1801	244 days	Federalist	Massachusetts	John Adams (1797–1801)
5		Henry Dearborn	March 5, 1801	March 4, 1809	7 years, 364 days	Democratic-Republican	Massachusetts	Thomas Jefferson (1801–1809)
6		William Eustis	March 7, 1809	January 13, 1813	3 years, 312 days	Democratic-Republican	Massachusetts	James Madison (1809–1817)
7		John Armstrong Jr.	January 13, 1813	September 27, 1814	1 year, 257 days	Democratic-Republican	New York	James Madison (1809–1817)
8		James Monroe	September 27, 1814	March 2, 1815	156 days	Democratic-Republican	Virginia	James Madison (1809–1817)
9		William H. Crawford	August 1, 1815	October 22, 1816	1 year, 82 days	Democratic-Republican	Georgia	James Madison (1809–1817)
10		John C. Calhoun	October 8, 1817	March 4, 1825	7 years, 147 days	Democratic-Republican	South Carolina	James Monroe (1817–1825)
11		James Barbour	March 7, 1825	May 23, 1828	3 years, 77 days	Democratic-Republican	Virginia	John Quincy Adams (1825–1829)
12		Peter Buell Porter	May 23, 1828	March 9, 1829	290 days	Democratic-Republican	New York	John Quincy Adams (1825–1829)
13		John Eaton	March 9, 1829	June 18, 1831	2 years, 101 days	Democratic	Tennessee	Andrew Jackson (1829–1837)
14		Lewis Cass	August 1, 1831	October 5, 1836	5 years, 65 days	Democratic	Ohio	Andrew Jackson (1829–1837)
15		Joel Roberts Poinsett	March 7, 1837	March 4, 1841	3 years, 362 days	Democratic	South Carolina	Martin Van Buren (1837–1841)
16		John Bell	March 5, 1841	September 13, 1841	193 days	Whig	South Carolina	William Henry Harrison (1841)
16		John Bell	March 5, 1841	September 13, 1841	193 days	Whig	South Carolina	John Tyler (1841–1845)
17		John Canfield Spencer	October 12, 1841	March 4, 1843	1 year, 143 days	Whig	New York	John Tyler (1841–1845)
18		James Madison Porter	March 8, 1843	February 14, 1844	347 days	Whig	Pennsylvania	John Tyler (1841–1845)
19		William Wilkins	February 15, 1844	March 4, 1845	1 year, 17 days	Democratic	Pennsylvania	John Tyler (1841–1845)
20		William Learned Marcy	March 6, 1845	March 4, 1849	3 years, 363 days	Democratic	New York	James K. Polk (1845–1849)
21		George W. Crawford	March 8, 1849	July 22, 1850	1 year, 136 days	Whig	Georgia	Zachary Taylor (1849–1850)
22		Charles Magill Conrad	August 15, 1850	March 4, 1853	2 years, 201 days	Whig	Virginia	Millard Fillmore (1850–1853)
23		Jefferson Davis	March 7, 1853	March 4, 1857	3 years, 362 days	Democratic	Mississippi	Franklin Pierce (1853–1857)
24		John B. Floyd	March 6, 1857	December 29, 1860	3 years, 298 days	Democratic	Virginia	James Buchanan (1857–1861)
25		Joseph Holt	January 18, 1861	March 4, 1861	45 days	Republican	Kentucky	James Buchanan (1857–1861)
26		Simon Cameron	March 5, 1861	January 14, 1862	315 days	Republican	Pennsylvania	Abraham Lincoln (1861–1865)
27		Edwin M. Stanton	January 20, 1862 (Note: From August 12, 1867 until January 14, 1868, Stanton was suspended from office, and Ulysses S. Grant served as Acting Secretary of War. For more on President Johnson's attempts to remove Stanton from office, see impeachment of Andrew Johnson.)	May 28, 1868	6 years, 129 days	Republican	Pennsylvania	Abraham Lincoln (1861–1865)
27		Edwin M. Stanton	January 20, 1862	May 28, 1868	6 years, 129 days	Republican	Pennsylvania	Andrew Johnson (1865–1869)
–		Ulysses S. Grant; Acting	August 12, 1867	January 14, 1868	155 days	Republican	Ohio	Andrew Johnson (1865–1869)
28		John McAllister Schofield	June 1, 1868	March 13, 1869	285 days	Republican	Illinois	Andrew Johnson (1865–1869)
29		John Aaron Rawlins	March 13, 1869	September 6, 1869	177 days	Republican	Illinois	Ulysses S. Grant (1869–1877)
–		William Sherman; Acting	September 6, 1869	October 25, 1869	49 days	Republican	Ohio	Ulysses S. Grant (1869–1877)
30		William W. Belknap	October 25, 1869	March 2, 1876	6 years, 129 days	Republican	Iowa	Ulysses S. Grant (1869–1877)
31		Alphonso Taft	March 8, 1876	May 22, 1876	81 days	Republican	Ohio	Ulysses S. Grant (1869–1877)
32		J. Donald Cameron	May 22, 1876	March 4, 1877	286 days	Republican	Pennsylvania	Ulysses S. Grant (1869–1877)
33		George W. McCrary	March 12, 1877	December 10, 1879	2 years, 273 days	Republican	Iowa	Rutherford B. Hayes (1877–1881)
34		Alexander Ramsey	December 10, 1879	March 4, 1881	1 year, 84 days	Republican	Minnesota	Rutherford B. Hayes (1877–1881)
35		Robert Todd Lincoln	March 5, 1881	March 4, 1885	3 years, 364 days	Republican	Illinois	James A. Garfield (1881)
35		Robert Todd Lincoln	March 5, 1881	March 4, 1885	3 years, 364 days	Republican	Illinois	Chester A. Arthur (1881–1885)
36		William Crowninshield Endicott	March 5, 1885	March 4, 1889	3 years, 364 days	Democratic	Massachusetts	Grover Cleveland (1885–1889)
37		Redfield Proctor	March 5, 1889	November 5, 1891	2 years, 245 days	Republican	Vermont	Benjamin Harrison (1889–1893)
38		Stephen Benton Elkins	December 17, 1891	March 4, 1893	1 year, 77 days	Republican	West Virginia	Benjamin Harrison (1889–1893)
39		Daniel S. Lamont	March 5, 1893	March 4, 1897	3 years, 364 days	Democratic	New York	Grover Cleveland (1885–1889)
40		Russell A. Alger	March 5, 1897	August 1, 1899	2 years, 149 days	Republican	Michigan	William McKinley (1897–1901)
41		Elihu Root	August 1, 1899	January 31, 1904	4 years, 183 days	Republican	New York	William McKinley (1897–1901)
41		Elihu Root	August 1, 1899	January 31, 1904	4 years, 183 days	Republican	New York	Theodore Roosevelt (1901–1909)
42		William Howard Taft	February 1, 1904	June 30, 1908	4 years, 150 days	Republican	Ohio	Theodore Roosevelt (1901–1909)
43		Luke Edward Wright	July 1, 1908	March 4, 1909	246 days	Republican	Tennessee	Theodore Roosevelt (1901–1909)
44		Jacob M. Dickinson	March 12, 1909	May 21, 1911	2 years, 70 days	Democratic	Tennessee	William Howard Taft (1909–1913)
45		Henry L. Stimson	May 22, 1911	March 4, 1913	1 year, 286 days	Republican	New York	William Howard Taft (1909–1913)
46		Lindley Miller Garrison	March 5, 1913	February 10, 1916	2 years, 342 days	Democratic	New Jersey	Woodrow Wilson (1913–1921)
47		Newton D. Baker	March 9, 1916	March 4, 1921	4 years, 360 days	Democratic	Ohio	Woodrow Wilson (1913–1921)
48		John W. Weeks	March 5, 1921	October 13, 1925	4 years, 223 days	Republican	Massachusetts	Warren G. Harding (1921–1923)
48		John W. Weeks	March 5, 1921	October 13, 1925	4 years, 223 days	Republican	Massachusetts	Calvin Coolidge (1923–1929)
49		Dwight F. Davis	October 14, 1925	March 4, 1929	3 years, 141 days	Republican	Missouri	Calvin Coolidge (1923–1929)
50		James William Good	March 6, 1929	November 18, 1929	257 days	Republican	Iowa	Herbert Hoover (1929–1933)
51		Patrick J. Hurley	December 9, 1929	March 4, 1933	3 years, 85 days	Republican	Oklahoma	Herbert Hoover (1929–1933)
52		George Dern	March 4, 1933	August 27, 1936	3 years, 176 days	Democratic	Utah	Franklin D. Roosevelt (1933–1945)
53		Harry Hines Woodring	September 25, 1936	June 20, 1940	3 years, 298 days	Democratic	Kansas	Franklin D. Roosevelt (1933–1945)
54		Henry L. Stimson	July 10, 1940	September 21, 1945	5 years, 73 days	Republican	New York	Franklin D. Roosevelt (1933–1945)
54		Henry L. Stimson	July 10, 1940	September 21, 1945	5 years, 73 days	Republican	New York	Harry S. Truman (1945–1953)
55		Robert P. Patterson	September 27, 1945	July 18, 1947	1 year, 294 days	Republican	New York	Harry S. Truman (1945–1953)
56		Kenneth Royall	July 19, 1947	September 18, 1947	61 days	Democratic	North Carolina	Harry S. Truman (1945–1953)

== See also ==
- Confederate States Secretary of War
- United States Secretary of Defense
