= List of The Naked Brothers Band films =

Film list

The Naked Brothers Band began their run on Nickelodeon with an independent film, which later was co-opted by the network as a pilot for the later series of the same name. Later made-for-TV movies were created and aired as the series went on, and eight films aired on Nickelodeon. Often the latter films were either two episodes which aired together or an extended episode (as Nickelodeon usually uses the "movie" definition for hour-long episodes of their series), and usually aired as either part of either a holiday event on the network or on a weekend. Several of the films have also received a DVD release by the "Nick DVD" division of Paramount Home Entertainment.

== Film history ==
- The Naked Brothers Band: The Movie – the first film/later pilot, which saw theater/film festival release on October 25, 2005 before the Nickelodeon series, and premiered on the network on January 27, 2007
- The Naked Brothers Band: Battle of the Bands – the second film which premiered on Nickelodeon on October 6, 2007
- The Naked Brothers Band: Sidekicks – the third film which premiered on Nickelodeon on January 21, 2008
- The Naked Brothers Band: Polar Bears – the fourth film which premiered on Nickelodeon on June 6, 2008
- The Naked Brothers Band: Mystery Girl – the fifth film which premiered on Nickelodeon on October 18, 2008
- The Naked Brothers Band: Operation Mojo – the sixth film which premiered on Nickelodeon on November 22, 2008
- The Naked Brothers Band: Naked Idol – the seventh film which premiered on Nickelodeon on March 14, 2009
- The Naked Brothers Band: The Premiere – the eighth film which premiered on Nickelodeon on April 11, 2009
