= List of The Naked Brothers Band episodes =

The Naked Brothers Band is an American musical comedy television series created and showran by Polly Draper, which aired on Nickelodeon from February 3, 2007, to June 13, 2009. It depicts the daily lives of Draper's sons, who lead a faux world-renowned children's rock band in New York City. As a mockumentary, the storyline is an embellished satire of their real lives, and the fictional presence of a camera is often acknowledged. The show stars Nat Wolff and Alex Wolff, the lead singer-songwriter, and drummer, respectively. Nat's fictional female interest Rosalina (Allie DiMeco) and real-life friends Thomas Batuello, David Levi, and Cooper Pillot, as well as Qaasim Middleton—who has no prior acquaintance with the family—feature as the other band members, with Draper's jazz musician husband Michael Wolff as his sons' widowed accordion-playing dad, and her niece Jesse Draper portraying the group's babysitter.

The series is a spinoff of Draper's film of the same name that was picked up by the network, premiering in January 2007. When the show debuted on the channel, it aired two episodes, garnering 3.7 million viewers. Viacom announced, the "series delivered Nickelodeon's highest-rated premiere in seven years" and it became favorable for children aged 6–11. The show concluded after three seasons because the network began placing high shooting demands on the family that would disrupt the siblings' schooling.

== Series overview ==
Season	Episodes	Originally released	
Season	Episodes	First released	Last released
Pilot		January 27, 2007	
1	13	February 3, 2007	October 20, 2007
2	15	January 21, 2008	June 6, 2008
3	11	October 18, 2008	June 13, 2009
TV Specials	3	December 1, 2007	January 31, 2009

== Episodes ==
=== Pilot ===
Title	Directed by	Written by	Music produced/arranged by	Music written/performed by	Original release date	U.S. total viewers (millions)
"The Naked Brothers Band: The Movie"	Polly Draper	Polly Draper	Michael A. Levine, Michael Wolff	Nat Wolff; Alex Wolff (one song)	January 27, 2007	2.7
The plot centers around two real-life singer-songwriting/musician brothers Nat Wolff and Alex Wolff, who lead the famous rock outfit The Silver Boulders. Along with the siblings, the band features guitarist Joshua Kaye, keyboardist David Levi, cellist Thomas Batuello, manager Cooper Pillot, and Jesse Cook (played by Jesse Draper) is their babysitter. The film follows the boys' difficulties with their fame and an argument that has the band temporarily breaking up. But they later reunite as The Naked Brothers Band in the end. Also featured in the film are Nat's crush Rosalina (played by Allie DiMeco), the siblings' childhood friend Cole Hawkins, and Mort Needleman (played by Jonathan Pillot). Songs Performed: "Crazy Car," "Got No Mojo," "Hardcore Wrestlers (With Inner Feelings)," "If There Was A Place To Hide," "Motormouth," "Rosalina," "That's How It Is"; Music underscore by: Michael Wolff Special Guest Appearance by: Ann Curry, Arsenio Hall, Barbara eda-Young, Cindy Blackman, Cyndi Lauper, David Thornton, Gretchen Egolf, James Badge Dale, Julianne Moore, Ken Olin, Mel Harris, Melanie Mayron, Nancy Wilson, Patricia Wettig, Peter Horton, Polly Draper, Ricki Lake, Tony Shalhoub, Uma Thurman

=== Season 1 (2007) ===
No.	Title	Directed by	Written by	Music produced by	Music written/performed by	Original release date	Prod. code	U.S. total viewers (millions)
1	"VMA's"	Polly Draper	Polly Draper	Michael A. Levine, Michael Wolff	Nat Wolff	February 3, 2007	101	3.5
The Naked Brothers Band are invited to the Video Music Awards (VMA's). This means that Nat and the rest of the band have to get ready and practice while Rosalina is having her braces removed. Jesse reads Nat and Alex their horoscopes; Nat's had said if he failed, he would bring everyone down with him. Alex's said that he would have to be cautious of falling objects and stay away from motorized vehicles. This worries Alex and now the band fears that they will not win the VMA's. Despite their fears, the band wins "Best Rock Video" for their song "Banana Smoothie."; Songs Performed: "I'm Out," "Banana Smoothie"; Music Supervised by: Michael Wolff Special Guest Appearance by: Snoop Dogg, Matt Pinfield
2	"Wolff Brothers Cry Wolf"	Melanie Mayron	Polly Draper	Michael A. Levine, Michael Wolff	Nat Wolff	February 3, 2007	104	3.8
The band is filming a music video for their song "Sometimes I'll Be There," and Nat must pretend to cry as the music video director is desperate to win an award. When she discovers that he is unable to do so, he asks Alex to. Alex can do it instantly and persuades Nat to give him $10 whenever he pretends to cry. When Nat finds out that Alex had been using acting tears from the director, an angry Nat chases Alex around the set. Alex then accidentally drops a bowl of concrete grapes on the floor. When Nat steps on them, it causes his eyes to tear and the director becomes excited because she says they are "real tears." Songs Performed: "Sometimes I'll Be There" Music Supervised by: Michael Wolff
3	"Nat is a Stand-Up Guy"	Polly Draper	Polly Draper	Michael A. Levine, Michael Wolff	Nat Wolff	February 10, 2007	103	2.8 (approx.)
Nat wants to prove to everyone, especially Rosalina, that he is more humorous than Alex so he decides to perform stand-up comedy. Subsequently, his performances becomes disastrous. Later on, the director has the rest of the band shaking their butts for a music video featuring Nat's new song, "Catch Up With The End." In addition, Alex runs around in a chicken costume. An unhappy Nat explains to the director that the lyric is a "metaphor" for "discombobulated" and is not supposed to be humorous. However, the director misunderstands him. Nat also wants to attempt stand-up comedy and no one finds him amusing; everyone always laughs at Alex's jokes though. That night, George Lopez appears at the band's benefit, where they perform "Catch Up With The End." Lopez announces them to the stage by saying, "...my daughter, Mayan, is really crazy about the band that I'm going to bring up. I think everyone is crazy about this band... I mean I can't believe these guys. They are truly amazing... Ladies and gentlemen. Give around of applause for The Naked Brothers Band." After the performance, Nat meets the director and his wife, who finds out what her husband did for the music video. The director's wife then chases him while shouting, "You make this sad chicken song funny!" Songs Performed: "Catch Up With The End," "Crazy Car," "I Indeed Can See"; Music Supervised by: Michael Wolff Special Guest Appearance by: George Lopez
4	"Fishin' For Love"	Polly Draper	Polly Draper	Michael A. Levine, Michael Wolff	Nat Wolff	February 17, 2007	106	2.8 (approx.)
The band decides to take a break and spend the day at the beach. David and Thomas are jealous that Nat attracts all the girls when they become attracted to two girls out on a boat, so they pretend to drown and be attacked by sharks to get their attention. On the other hand, Mr. Wolff and Qaasim pass out flyers for the band's next concert. Meanwhile, Alex and Jesse try to break a world record for sand counting. Nat recalls when Rosalina kissed him on the cheek during a concert in Chicago; however, she says she does not remember. Song Performed: "Fishing For Love" Music Supervised by: Michael Wolff
5	"Alex's Clothing Line"	Melanie Mayron	Polly Draper	Michael A. Levine, Michael Wolff	Nat Wolff	February 24, 2007	105	2.8 (approx.)
Alex gets a new clothing line and is satisfied until he sees everyone wearing it, including a boy who pretends to be him. On the other hand, Nat writes a song about a blond haired girl with shiny blue eyes. A suspicious Rosalina questions whether or not him has a girlfriend. It is later revealed that Nat only wrote those lyrics so the rest of the band would no longer ridicule the fact that he has a crush on Rosalina. Song Performed: "Beautiful Eyes" Music Supervised by: Michael Wolff
6	"Puberty"	Polly Draper	Magda Liolis	Michael A. Levine, Michael Wolff	Nat Wolff	March 10, 2007	107	2.8 (approx.)
During the recording of Taxi Cab, Nat thinks that he is going through puberty because his voice is changing. He doesn't like it, but Alex desperately wants puberty. Song Performed: "Taxi Cab," "L.A." Music Supervised by: Michael Wolff
7	"A Rebel and a Skateboarder"	Melanie Mayron	Magda Liolis	Michael A. Levine, Michael Wolff	Alex Wolff	March 17, 2007	108	2.8 (approx.)
Rosalina wants to wrestle Nat, though he prefers not to wrestle a girl. On the other hand, Alex attempts to run away to the skate park and quits the Naked Brothers Band, because Jesse is still dating The Timmerman Brothers. Realizing he cannot get there on his own, he asks Jesse to drive him to the skate park. She feels it is a good idea and that he "works too hard." When Alex is at the skate park, he meets a girl named Juanita and eventually develops feelings for her. When Alex returns to the band with Juanita, Nat wrestles Rosalina, and subsequently, she beats him. The rest of the bandmates are impressed. Rosalina's professional wrestler suddenly appears and teaches the band how to wrestle. Songs Performed: "I Could Be" Music Supervised by: Michael Wolff
8	"A Man Needs a Maid"	Polly Draper	Polly Draper	Michael A. Levine, Michael Wolff	Nat Wolff	March 24, 2007	109	2.8 (approx.)
The night before, Nat and Alex had a sleepover with the band—while excluding Rosalina—also watching the music video for their hula dancing-inspired song, “Banana Smoothie.” The house is a mess that morning, so Cooper hires a cleaning specialist named Betty. However, it turns out that she's not a maid, yet advises the kids on ways to be "clean." When Dad arrives, he and Betty fall in love, causing much stress for Nat and Alex. Song Performed: "Banana Smoothie" Music Supervised by: Michael Wolff
9	"First Kiss (On The Lips, That Is)"	Melanie Mayron	Michael Rubiner & Bob Mittenthal	Michael A. Levine, Michael Wolff	Nat Wolff	April 7, 2007	112	2.8 (approx.)
When Nat and Rosalina find out they have to kiss in their new music video, the two are nervous, though for different reasons. Rosalina is conflicted about her feelings for Nat—after all, she is a teenager while he is only eleven. She begs the director to recast and he does, setting up a contest for a lucky girl to be the first girl ever to kiss Nat on the lips. Nat is hurt and his friendship with Rosalina becomes strained, especially when the winner of the contest, Daisy, is a very pretty, sweet girl that everyone likes including Nat. Later on, however, Rosalina feels guilty and tries to resolve her relationship. Subsequently, she gives Nat his first kiss on the lips in his dressing room. Song Performed: "Long Distance" Music Supervised by: Michael Wolff
10	"The Song"	Melanie Mayron	Magda Liolis	Michael A. Levine, Michael Wolff	Nat Wolff	June 22, 2007	113	2.8 (approx.)
Nat and Alex write the exact same song for Juanita and her friends at a benefit to raise money for her foster home. Nat and Alex fight over who wrote the song first. To resolve the conflict between them, Cooper plays the documentary cameras to see who wrote it first and it turns out that they "wrote it at the exact same time." Nat and Alex's dad reveals to them that their mom—who died, but not in real life—wrote and sang the song to Nat and Alex when they were very young. Later on, their dad tells them that he and Betty are going steady, much to Nat and Alex's dismay. Fortunately, Betty lets their dad buy Nat and Alex a puppy named Lucky, as she is hypoallergenic. Song Performed: "Nowhere (I Miss My Family)," "L.A." Music Supervised by: Michael Wolff
11–12	"Battle of the Bands"	Polly Draper	Will McRobb and Chris Viscardi	Michael A. Levine, Michael Wolff	Nat Wolff	October 6, 2007 (Note: This episode was first released in Battle of the Bands DVD on September 4, 2007.)	110-111/ 999	3.8
The Naked Brothers Band and another band, the L.A. Surfers, find themselves competing in a "Battle of the Bands" charity event benefiting Little Kids Rock, a nonprofit organization that provides free instruments and lessons to children from low-income public schools. Rosalina starts to fall for the L.A. Surfers' lead singer, Bobby Love. It annoys Nat that Rosalina hangs out with the opponent's lead singer. It turns out that Bobby is just dating Rosalina to get to Nat and is lying about everything, i.e., his British accent, not writing his own songs, etc. Nat and Bobby fight and declare at a press conference that the charity event is now a competition and the losing band's proceeds from their next CD goes to the charity. After Nat's unsuccessful attempts to tell Rosalina the truth about Bobby, he and the band make fun of her and she quits. She tells Bobby what happened (what the band thought about him), then throws away her music into the garbage, and when no one is looking, Bobby pilfers it. At the concert, Bobby's band plays Nat's new song that he stole from Rosalina. She discovers Bobby is fake, and runs over to the band, hugs Nat, and apologizes to him, while crying. There is a net of balloons above the stage and Rosalina pulls the rope. Balloons fall all over Bobby's band and his fake identity is revealed because he is afraid of balloons and freaks out. The Naked Brothers Band plays Nat's new song "Girl Of My Dreams," dedicated to Rosalina. They then win the Battle of the Bands. Songs Performed: "L.A.," "Girl Of My Dreams"; Music Supervised by: Michael Wolff Special Guest Appearance by: Keli Price, Matt Pinfield
13	"Alien Clones"	Melanie Mayron	Magda Liolis	Michael A. Levine, Michael Wolff	Alex Wolff, Nat Wolff	October 20, 2007	102	N/A
The concept behind their new video shoot is that there are alien clones of all the band members who are taking over. Alex takes this idea to heart and becomes terrified that everyone around him is actually an alien clone. Alex becomes even more frightened when he sees Jesse with a new tattoo that says "Gus 4-E." Alex believes that she is an alien clone and the band thinks he is crazy, but decide to go spying on her. They begin to hear strange noises and run around the house scared. They later find out that the noises came from Mr. Wolff. Then Rosalina shows up and tells them that Jesse is dating a guy named Gus who lives in apartment 4E. Songs Performed: "Run," "Alien Clones" Music Supervised by: Michael Wolff

=== Season 2 (2008) ===
No.	Title	Directed by	Written by	Music produced by	Music written/performed by	Original release date	Prod. code	U.S. total viewers (millions)
1–2	"Sidekicks"	Polly Draper	Polly Draper	Michael A. Levine, Michael Wolff	Nat Wolff	January 21, 2008	201-202/ 997	3.6
Nat and Alex are going to their middle school party. The theme is superhero costumes. When Jesse introduces her two sisters, Tessy and Bessy, to Nat and Alex, she tells Nat that Rosalina's high school prom is on the same day as the middle school party. Rosalina goes with the most popular guy in school because Nat tells her to (he was told it was every girl's dream). Nat gets stuck in a situation where he takes "the most popular" girl in the freshmen class, Patrice, to the prom. In the end, Patrice and Wade (the most popular guy in Amigos High School) are together while Nat and Rosalina are also together because their dates left them. They dance for a while and then leave the high school prom to go to the Masquerade Party in the middle school to perform Nat's song "I Don't Want To Go To School."; Songs Performed: "I Don't Want To Go to School," "Mystery Girl" Music Supervised by: Michael Wolff
3	"Great Trip"	Polly Draper	Polly Draper	Michael A. Levine, Michael Wolff	Nat Wolff	February 2, 2008	204	N/A
Nat, Alex, and Jesse try to win a free trip to Kids Paradise, a huge water park, through dog food cans. David ends up winning the trip and must decide who to take. The whole band sucks up to him by giving him presents so that he will take them. He tells Rosalina he can't take her because she's a girl, Cooper snores too loud, Thomas gets scared when he is away from his mom for too long, Qaasim because gets scared on roller coasters, and Alex's feet smell. So, he decides to take Nat and Mr. Wolff. Nat leaves Alex in control of rehearsals and he and Jesse take control of the band. Alex becomes a sergeant, yelling at the bandmates and making them do push ups for being 10 minutes late for band rehearsal. Meanwhile, on the trip, David accidentally pushes Nat's dad down the slide and he tries to get revenge, but David is too lucky. The band becomes tired of Alex taking charge and they pull a prank by making him believe that E.T., David's dog, can actually talk. When they get back, David tells Nat that he may not actually be lucky, but rather smart. In addition, he says he dislikes it because it is too much work. Songs Performed: "Great Trip," "Motormouth" Music Supervised by: Michael Wolff
4	"Three is Enough"	Jonathan Judge	Polly Draper	Michael A. Levine, Michael Wolff	Nat Wolff, Alex Wolff	February 9, 2008	203	N/A
Cooper asks Patty Scoggins out on a date. He is nervous and begs Nat to ask Rosalina to go with them. Nat doesn't want to, but he asks her for Cooper anyway. Rosalina suggests that they go see a horror movie, so that Cooper will seem brave. Cooper accidentally spills a blue slushy all over her, but the date turns out well. Nat and Rosalina leave holding hands. Alex writes a new song about his dream girl, Melody. He is mad when the cartoonist puts a picture of his dream girl in Nat's new song, but not in his. He later meets the cartoonist's granddaughter who is his dream girl. She kisses him on the cheek, which makes Juanita mad. Meanwhile, the downstairs neighbor gets annoyed by all the noise that they make, so Jesse goes on a date with him. The Timmerman Brothers go along to split them up. Songs Performed: "Tall Girls, Short Girls... You," "Three Is Enough"; Music Supervised by: Michael Wolff Special Guest Appearance by: Jules Feiffer
5	"The Talk Show"	Jonathan Judge	Magda Liolis	Michael A. Levine, Michael Wolff	Nat Wolff	February 16, 2008	205	N/A
Nat is upset when a critic named Sam Lee gives his song "Banana Smoothie" a bad review. However, he gets excited when he and Alex are told they get to interview Joel Madden. But when Alex learns that he flirted with Jesse at the Kids Choice Awards, he gets angry and tells Nat he is not doing the interview. Nat finds out that he must interview Sam Lee who turns out to be a young girl. Dad and Betty think that Sam Lee is really Joel Madden and they chase her around. At the interview, Alex tries to keep Jesse away from Joel, while Dad and Betty try to get an interview with Joel Madden. Sam Lee gets made fun of, so Nat decides to help her write a song which they perform with Joel. Songs Performed: "Proof Of My Love," "Banana Smoothie"; Music Supervised by: Michael Wolff Special Guest Appearance by: Joel Madden
6	"The Bar Mitzvah"	Melanie Mayron	Michael Rubiner & Bob Mittenthal	Michael A. Levine, Michael Wolff	Nat Wolff	February 23, 2008	206	N/A
Cooper prepares for his big Bar Mitzvah while Alex switches places with a skate-boarder named Mitchie Brusco who looks like him (because they both have a mole on their upper lip). While Alex gets to meet Tony Hawk, Mitchie must go to Cooper's Bar Mitzvah. At the Bar Mitzvah, a tape is shown where Nat, who is on too much laughing gas, reveals Cooper's secrets. This sends the party into a disaster, so Nat decides to have the band perform but discovers that Alex is really Mitchie. Meanwhile, Alex gets into trouble when he challenges Tony Hawk to a skate off. Alex and Mitchie both decide to fake injuries and they switch back. Songs Performed: "If You Can Make It Through The Rain"; Music Supervised by: Michael Wolff Special Guest Appearance by: Tony Hawk
7	"Uncle Miles"	Melanie Mayron	Magda Liolis	Michael A. Levine, Michael Wolff	Nat Wolff	March 8, 2008	207	N/A
Dad's twin brother Uncle Miles (Michael Wolff) comes to visit and the boys think that he is way cooler than their dad. Alex says that all younger brothers are better than bigger brothers. The band holds a Battle of the Brothers contest with Cooper and Rosalina as judges. When Betty meets Uncle Miles, she falls in love with him. However, he is not the nicest man and excludes his brother in every way. Alex then realizes that he doesn't want him and Nat to end up like his dad and Uncle; he wants to remain friends. So, they both decide to do bad at the contest. Dad discovers that Betty is dumping him and joining Uncle Miles' band. To get revenge, the boys pull off Uncle Miles' wig, and to make Dad feel better, Alex lets his dad play the accordion for his new song. Songs Performed: "Changing" Music Supervised by: Michael Wolff
8	"Concert Special #2"	Jonathan Judge	N/A	Michael A. Levine, Michael Wolff	Nat Wolff, Alex Wolff	April 5, 2008	216	N/A
The band performs a concert in front of a live audience featuring new and old songs from the show. Songs Performed: "Body I Occupy," "Three Is Enough," "Mystery Girl," "Your Smile," "Drum Solo," "Eventually," "I Don't Want To Go To School," "I'm Out" Music Supervised by: Michael Wolff
9	"Everybody's Cried at Least Once"	Melanie Mayron	Magda Liolis	Michael A. Levine, Michael Wolff	Nat Wolff	April 12, 2008	208	N/A
The band prepares to leave on their tour. The band members face different problems: Dad is still upset about his split from Betty, so Nat and Alex end up leaving Lucky behind and give him to Dad; Rosalina's father is getting divorced for the fourth time and almost doesn't make it in time to say goodbye; and David isn't allowed to bring E.T.—if he leaves him home, his mom will send her to the kennel. But everything worked out after all: Dad started laughing again after he started watching George Lopez's stand-up comedy on television, and Dad and George Lopez end up going to accordion camp together; Tuffy ends up letting E.T. come on the bus after all; and Rosalina's dad made it just in time before the bus left. Songs Performed: "Beautiful Eyes," "Crazy Car," "Everybody's Cried At Least Once," "Long Distance"; Music Supervised by: Michael Wolff Special Guest Appearance by: George Lopez
10	"Cleveland"	Melanie Mayron	Polly Draper	Michael A. Levine, Michael Wolff	Nat Wolff	April 19, 2008	209	N/A
The band kicks off their tour in the midwest. The fans are going crazy and the band mates are annoyed that Nat gets all the attention, especially Thomas. Rosalina is jealous too, but tries not to show it. She is jealous of all the attention that Nat gets from all the girls that like him. The band members try to make Thomas feel better, but it doesn't work. But, when they arrive to Cleveland, everyone starts screaming for Thomas and he thought Nat did that for a joke. Qaasim and David go online to figure out how Thomas got all the girls. A crazy lady (Melanie Mayron), who interviewed the band, said that Thomas loves the girls of Cleveland, but he actually said he loves girls from Venus. Since the crazy lady thought he said he loved girls from Cleveland, it made the people of Cleveland his favorite. At the end, the band performs "Body I Occupy" at a concert in Cleveland. Also, Thomas rewrote the song, "Boys Rule, Girls Drool" from The Naked Brothers Band: The Movie back when he was nine, to "Girls Rule, Boys Drool," and performed it on stage in honor of the girls of Cleveland. Songs Performed: "Body I Occupy"; Music Supervised by: Michael Wolff Guest Star: Melanie Mayron (Also Episode Director)
11	"The County Fair"	Jonathan Judge	Michael Rubiner & Bob Mittenthal	Michael A. Levine, Michael Wolff	Nat Wolff	May 10, 2008	210	N/A
The band stops at the county fair where they each participate in different activities. The bunny suits don't work, so they all dress up as girls (excluding Rosalina, who dresses up as a boy) so they don't get recognized. Nat and Rosalina go on a bull riding contest and gets teased by boys. Alex enters a beauty pageant. Qaasim, David, and Thomas compete in the Greased Pig Contest. Songs Performed: "Crazy Car," "Tall Girls, Short Girls... You" Music Supervised by: Michael Wolff
12	"County Fair Concert Special"	Jonathan Judge	N/A	Michael A. Levine, Michael Wolff	Nat Wolff	May 24, 2008	218	N/A
The band performs a concert in front of a live audience featuring new and old songs from the show at the Rye Playland in Rye, New York. Songs Performed: "Banana Smoothie," "Crazy Car," "Great Trip," "I'll Do Anything," "Motormouth," "Run," "Tall Girls, Short Girls... You," "Taxi Cab" Music Supervised by: Michael Wolff
13–15	"Polar Bears"	Polly Draper	Polly Draper	Michael A. Levine, Michael Wolff	Nat Wolff	June 6, 2008	211-213/ 996	1.7 (ages 6-11)
The band's final stop is in New Orleans, where they stay with Onita (Donna Lynn Leavy), an old friend of Nat and Alex's mom. Nat and Alex also see their childhood friends and Onita's daughters, Big Ella and Little Grace (Saoirse Scott). During the ride down there, Jesse heard about a funny movie from a guy "with sparkly eyes" and she told Alex to watch it. It turns out it to be the film An Inconvenient Truth, starring Al Gore. After Alex watched it, he became obsessed with saving the polar bears who were dying from global warming. Meanwhile, Nat starts hanging out with Little Grace, causing Rosalina (Allie DiMeco) and Qaasim to take it the wrong way—thinking he's in love with her. When Qaasim tries to flirt with Little Grace (with advice from Rosalina), it creates a problem for the three of them. At a press conference, Alex is looking at a calendar and says, "Look at our calendar. Our picture. We're bigger than Santa Claus." The reporters only hear him say, "We're bigger than Santa Claus," accusing him of calling Santa "a big fat blubber belly," and the band runs to Onita's trailer, hiding from the reporters. After the press conference, the media cancelled the concert. In the end, Nat found out that Rosalina thought he was in love with Grace. He then said, "No, I love you Rosalina, how could she not know I love her?" but Nat didn't know she was in the room the whole time. After that, Nat and Rosalina hug and kiss each other. The band then raises money at the state dinner and gives it to a charity that helps global warming. Songs Performed: "Eventually," "Flying Away," "I'll Do Anything," "I've Got A Question," "Why"; Music Supervised by: Michael Wolff Special Guest Appearance by: George Lopez, Phil Collins

=== Season 3 (2008–09) ===
No.	Title	Directed by	Written by	Music produced/arranged by	Music written/performed by	Original release date	Prod. code	U.S. total viewers (millions)
1–2	"Mystery Girl"	Jonathan Judge	Polly Draper	Michael A. Levine, Michael Wolff	Nat Wolff, Alex Wolff	October 18, 2008	301-302/ 995	4.0
The band is making a major motion picture, but it's far from quiet on the set as Nat grapples with why his girlfriend, Rosalina, is trying to get herself written out of the script. To Nat's dismay, he discovers that Rosalina is about to leave on a six-month cruise around the world, her prize for winning a music competition. Meanwhile, on the set, Alex freaks out when he discovers that his part in the movie requires him to kiss his skateboarding buddy, Juanita. Nat has to kiss his co-star, actress Miranda Cosgrove, who plays herself. Songs Performed: "Blueberry Cotton," "Face In The Hall," "I Don't Want To Go To School," "Scary World," "Your Smile"; Music Supervised by: Michael Wolff Special Guest Appearance by: Miranda Cosgrove
3–4	"Operation Mojo"	Polly Draper	Michael Rubiner & Bob Mittenthal	Michael A. Levine, Michael Wolff	Nat Wolff	November 22, 2008	303-304/ 994	2.8
When Nat sees a tabloid photo of Rosalina kissing another guy during her around-the-world cruise, he becomes convinced that he is losing her for good and goes into a funk that threatens to prevent him from finishing the movie the band is making. Desperate to snap him out of his gloom, Alex leads Nat into the wilderness, believing that surviving the perils of nature will lead Nat to discover his inner strength and regain his mojo. But with so much at stake, Alex knows that failure isn't an option. So, he enlists the aid of his band mates to clandestinely stage events designed to make Nat believe he is a wilderness hero. Songs Performed: "Curious," "Got No Mojo," "I Feel Alone" Music Supervised by: Michael Wolff
5	"Christmas Special"	Jonathan Judge	Polly Draper	Michael A. Levine, Michael Wolff	Nat Wolff	December 13, 2008	307	N/A
Nat has the holiday blues since Rosalina's letters from abroad have a steadily decreasing number of X's and O's. If Nat doesn't find something to give him the Christmas spirit, it could ruin a benefit the band is holding for "Save the Children," which is hosted by Whoopi Goldberg. Meanwhile, Alex is in a competition with the adorable Timmerman Brothers to create the world's worst online Christmas video. Songs Performed: "Yes We Can"; Music Supervised by: Michael Wolff Special Guest Appearance by: Natasha Bedingfield, Whoopi Goldberg, Leon G. Thomas III
6	"Valentine Dream Date"	Jonathan Judge	Magda Liolis and Polly Draper	Michael A. Levine, Michael Wolff	Nat Wolff, Alex Wolff	February 7, 2009	308	3.2
Nat decides to go on a dating game show. Nat's girlfriend Rosalina takes a break from her six-month cruise to surprise Nat for a visit, but Nat needs to figure out how to explain to her about the dating game show. Alex also has dating problems himself; Alex helps Jesse get back together with her ex-boyfriend, Abdul (Daniel Raymont), by pretending to be Cupid. Abdul ends up falling in love with Jesse, which causes problems for Alex since he always claimed to be her boyfriend, ever since he was 6 years old. Songs Performed: "Jesse," "No Night Is Perfect"; Music Supervised by: Michael Wolff Special Guest Appearance by: Victoria Justice
7–8	"Naked Idol"	Polly Draper	Magda Liolis and Bob Mittenthal	Michael A. Levine, Michael Wolff	Nat Wolff	March 14, 2009	305-306/ 993	N/A
After returning from her worldly travels, Rosalina gets a visit from Michel (Jake Hertzog), the French piano prodigy that Rosalina kissed on her cruise. Michel tries to persuade Rosalina to kiss her "goodbye" and when Nat sees this, he and Michel get into a brawl and Nat proudly almost breaks his finger. When Rosalina gets back, she yells at Nat for hurting Michel. She then breaks up with Nat and quits the band. This leads to the band members starting auditions for the "Naked Idol" television event, which is to find a new bass player, with videos of auditions over the computer and successfully narrow it down to three people. A girl named Kristina becomes the new bass player and Rosalina cries while watching this on TV in her room. Meanwhile, Alex is depressed because his life is passing him by and hosts an "Al-Expo," which is all about him. The movie ends with a cliffhanger; Rosalina was talking to Michel in the studio, explaining about how she's upset about leaving the band. Michel says that she's too good for the band anyway and Rosalina replies, "You know what, I'm too good for you" and leaves the studio. All the band members—except for Kristina—tell Nat that Rosalina has a change in heart and wants to rejoin the band. Songs Performed: "Curious," "Eventually," "I Feel Alone," "I'm Out," "Rosalina," "The World (As We Know It Today)"; Music Supervised by: Michael Wolff Special Guest Appearance by: Dave Attell, David Desrosiers, Tobin Esperance
9–10	"The Premiere"	Jonathan Judge	Michael Rubiner & Bob Mittenthal and Polly Draper	Michael A. Levine, Michael Wolff	Nat Wolff	April 11, 2009	309-310/ 992	N/A
The band is going to be on the Red Carpet as they premiere their new movie. It is also a big choice for the band whether to keep their new bassist Kristina or take Rosalina back. In addition, things go awry when Nat tries to find a date for the premiere. Songs Performed: "Fire", "Just A Girl I Know," "Little Old Nita," "Run"; Music Supervised by: Michael Wolff Special Guest Appearance by: Victoria Justice
11	"No School's Fools Day"	Rosario Roveto, Jr.	Polly Draper	Michael A. Levine, Michael Wolff	Alex Wolff	June 13, 2009	311	N/A
The band is competing for the stinky shoe award. They have to pull the biggest prank ever and whoever wins gets the award. David and Qaasim shave half of Thomas's head but end up getting arrested. Rosalina and Kristina team up with a police officer's daughter and pretend to be different people; Nat pretends to be a mime. Songs Performed: "All I Needed"; Music Supervised by: Michael Wolff Special Guest Appearance By: Questlove

=== TV specials ===
No.	Title	Directed by	Written by	Music produced/arranged by	Music written/performed by	Original release date	U.S. total viewers (millions)
S01	"Been There, Rocked That"	Rosario Roveto	Magda Liolis	Michael A. Levine, Michael Wolff	Nat Wolff, Alex Wolff	December 1, 2007	214
Nat and Alex kick off their tour with a press junket showing music videos and telling the stories behind some of their favorite songs from season one. Songs Performed: "Banana Smoothie," "Fishing For Love," "Long Distance," "Run," "Taxi Cab," “I Could Be” Music Supervised by: Michael Wolff Guest Stars: Albie Hecht (Series Executive Producer), Magda Liolis (Series Writer), Russ Spiegel (Series Music Instructor), Will M. Dunn (Series Production Assistant)
S02	"Supertastic 6"	Mark Salisbury	Michael Rubiner & Bob Mittenthal	Michael A. Levine, Michael Wolff	Nat Wolff	November 26, 2008	217
This episode is an animated special. The band's superhero alter egos must stop a jazz-playing criminal genius from stealing the world's hair supply. Songs Performed: "Body I Occupy," "Little Old Nita"; Music Produced by: Michael A. Levine, Michael Wolff Special Guest Appearance by: Matt Pinfield, Polly Draper
S03	"Secrets of the NBB Summer Tour"	Polly Draper	Magda Liolis	Michael A. Levine, Michael Wolff	Nat Wolff	January 31, 2009	215
Nat and Alex hang out in the editorial room with series editor Craig Cobb. In a video, Theo (Nat Wolff) and Leo (Alex Wolff) show clips of their favorite episodes from season two. Songs Performed: "I Don't Want To Go To School"; Music Supervised by: Michael Wolff Guest Star: Craig Cobb (Series Editor)
