= The Premiere (The Naked Brothers Band) =

- The Naked Brothers Band episodes
- Episode nos.: Season 3 Episodes 10-11
- Directed by: Jonathan Judge
- Written by: Michael Rubiner & Bob Mittenthal and Polly Draper
- Cinematography by: Ken H. Keller
- Editing by: Craig Cobb
- Production code: 309-310/ 992
- Original air date: April 11, 2009

Guest appearance
- Victoria Justice

Episode chronology
← Previous "Naked Idol"	Next → "No School Fool's Day"

"The Premiere" is the tenth and eleventh episodes of the third season of the television series The Naked Brothers Band, which aired as a television movie on Nickelodeon on April 11, 2009, and is currently available to stream on Paramount+ and Amazon Prime Video.

The TV movie episode is in the format of a rock-mockumentary. The Premiere is directed by Jonathan Judge, and written by Michael Rubiner, Bob Mittenthal, and Polly Draper, who also serves as showrunner and is the mother to the show's stars Nat Wolff and Alex Wolff, the lead singer-songwriter and drummer, respectively.

The premise of "The Premiere" is that The Naked Brothers Band Musical Mystery Movie premieres. It also features a guest appearance by Victoria Justice from Zoey 101.

== Plot ==
Everything is finally finished for the premiere of The Naked Brothers Band "Musical Mystery Movie". Now the band has to go through the press release and the red carpet! Nat, hearing about Rosalina wanting to be back in the band, has to decide, along with the rest of the band, whether to keep their new bass player, Kristina, or agree to let Rosalina back in the band. The director that Cooper replaced is still out to get revenge on the Naked Brothers band for firing him as a director.

Plus, the publicist for the movie tells the band that each of them need to bring a date to the premiere with them. Alex thinks his hair can tell the future if you ask it a question, but in reality, can it? Who will Nat choose? Rosalina the love of his life? Or Kristina the girl who was inspired by his music? Plus, what about his date? So he picks all of them. He ends up with all his girl fans as dates along with Rosalina, Victoria Justice, and Kristina. He arrives at the premiere in an ice cream truck.

On the red carpet, Nat shouts out to Victoria Justice that he's available. Nat tells Rosalina he loves her leaving her confused and then he kisses Kristina after she accidentally spills ice cream on his tuxedo. The film ends with the band performing "Just a Girl I Know".

== Cast ==
Cast	Credited	Role
Nat Wolff	2007–Present	Nat: ages 9–14, Lead singer-songwriter/keyboardist and occasional guitarist friends with Rosalina and Kristina
Alex Wolff	2007–Present	Alex: ages 6–11, Drummer and occasional Lead singer-songwriter
Thomas Batuello	2007–Present	Thomas: ages 9–14, Cellist, Bassist
Allie DiMeco	2007–Present	Rosalina: ages 11–16, Bassist, 2nd Guitarist friends with Nat And Kristina
David Julian Levi	2007–Present	David: ages 9–13, Keyboardist
Qaasim Middleton	2007–Present	Qaasim: ages 11–13, Guitarist
Cooper Pillot	2007–Present	Cooper: ages 9–13, Band Manager
Jesse Draper	2007–Present	Jesse Cook: Band tutor and singer/dancer
Kristina Reyes	March 14, 2009- June 13, 2009	Kristina: ages 15–15, Bassist friends with Nat And Rosalina
Michael Wolff	2007–Present	Mr. Sonny Wolff
