= Toni Seawright =

American actress and singer-songwriter

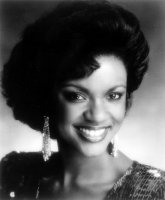
- Toni Seawright becomes the first African-American announced Miss Mississippi in 1987.
- Born: 1964 or 1965 (age 61–62)
- Occupations: Actress singer-songwriter
- Years active: 1987–present

Toni Seawright (born 1964 or 1965) is an American actress and singer-songwriter. In 1987 Seawright was the first African American to become Miss Mississippi, and in 1988 was fourth runner-up in the Miss America pageant.

== Life and career ==
Seawright graduated from the Mississippi University for Women in Columbus, Mississippi, where she was the first African American to earn a degree in music at Mississippi University for Women, and majored in Vocal Music and Business at that university. Toni became the first African American to hold a recital in vocal music at MUW as well. She went on to compete for Miss W, the local chapter preliminary to the Miss America Pageant and won. This win put her in the position to compete for the state's Miss Mississippi Pageant in 1987. She won the pageant, making history as the very first African American to do so. She was the fourth runner-up in the Miss America Pageant, representing the state of Mississippi in 1987.

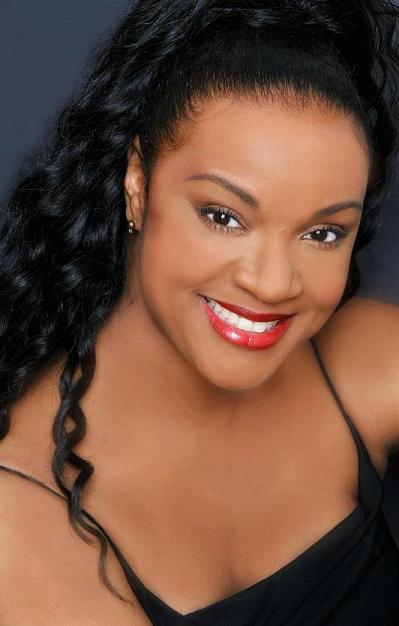
Toni Seawright playing the mother of Parrish Diaz in Tony Clomax's 12 Steps to Recovery

Seawright sang background vocals for artists such as Teena Marie, Freddie Jackson, Tony Terry, RuPaul, Shaggy, and Laura Branigan. Seawright starred alongside Stephanie Mills and Andre DeShields in the musical The Wiz. Ms. Seawright made her Broadway debut in Street Corner Symphony and Delta Rising, both at the 651 ARTS Theater. She also starred in the off-Broadway play Josh (The Black Babe Ruth)/Satchel (Requiem for Racism) at the National Federal Theater (also known as the Abron Arts Center), and Sister Ann in the AUDELCO award-winning play What Would Jesus Do? at the Billie Holiday Theater. Seawright most recently appeared starring as Miss Mamie in "The Widow and Miss Mamie" at the Harlem School of the Arts.

Seawright is currently writing and producing material for her two sons, Qaasim Middleton and Khalil Middleton. The duo have worked with famed producers Full Force as well as Magick Blyss Entertainment, founded by Kevin Hunte, of So You Think You Can Dance fame. Seawright's ex-husband is Keith "Wild Child" Middleton, who starred in STOMP. The two had two sons together, Qaasim and Kahlil. Seawright has guest starred twice on the Nickelodeon musical comedy series The Naked Brothers Band, which co-stars her on-and-off-screen son, Qaasim, who appeared in HBO's The Music in Me. Seawright's younger son, Khalil, starred in Noggin's Jack's Big Music Show. Qaasim was a finalist on Season 14 of American Idol.

== Filmography ==
- "Everybody's Cried at Least Once" (The Naked Brothers Band) (2008)
- "Mystery Girl" (The Naked Brothers Band) (2008)

Awards and achievements
Preceded by Kimberly McGuffee	Miss Mississippi; 1987	Succeeded by Carla Haag
