= Naked Idol =

- The Naked Brothers Band episodes
- Episode nos.: Season 3 Episodes 8-9
- Directed by: Polly Draper
- Written by: Magda Liolis and Bob Mittenthal
- Cinematography by: Ken H. Keller
- Editing by: Craig Cobb
- Production code: 305-306/ 993
- Original air date: March 14, 2009

Guest appearances
- David Desrosiers; Dave Attell; Tobin Esperance

Episode chronology
← Previous "Valentine Dream Date"	Next → "The Premiere"

"Naked Idol" is the eighth and ninth episodes of the third season of the television series The Naked Brothers Band, which aired as a television movie on Nickelodeon on March 14, 2009.

The TV movie episode is in the format of a rock-mockumentary. Naked Idol is written by Magda Liolis and Bob Mittenthal, and directed by Polly Draper, who is also the showrunner and mother to the show's stars Nat Wolff and Alex Wolff, the lead singer-songwriter and drummer, respectively. The TV movie also features guest appearances by David Desrosiers (Simple Plan) and Tobin Esperance (Papa Roach).

The premise of "Naked Idol" is that The Naked Brothers Band puts on a Naked Idol contest for a new bassist to replace Rosalina (Allie DiMeco) after she quits due to an argument between her and Nat over a tabloid in the newspaper depicting her kissing a French man named Michel (Jake Hertzog) while she was away on a cruise.

== Plot ==
Rosalina returns after her music cruise, but Michel, a French man Rosalina kissed on the cruise, also arrives. He criticizes Nat's music and kisses Rosalina, which causes a heated argument between Nat and Rosalina. They break up their relationship and Rosalina subsequently quits the band.

Nat and the band look all around the world, searching for a new bass player and meets some of the greatest musicians that ever lived. The band picks a girl named Kristina Reyes, who is a talented bass player and very nice, though Nat is still heartbroken over Rosalina's departure. Therefore, Nat initially comes off a bit rude to Kristina.

Shortly after, Nat realizes that he does not want to encounter the breakup alone. The band gathers at the Wolffs' apartment while they hug and sing together. Rosalina then tells Michel that she is too good for him and walks out heading towards the apartment.

The television movie special concludes with a cliff hanger. Just as Kristina gets settled in as the new bassist, the band gets a call from Rosalina inquiring if she can rejoin the band.

== Cast ==
Cast	Credited	Role
Nat Wolff	2007–2009	Nat: ages 11–15, Lead singer-songwriter/keyboardist and occasional guitarist; Rosalina's Boyfriend (later ex-boyfriend)
Alex Wolff	2007–2009	Alex: ages 8–12, Drummer and occasional Lead singer-songwriter.
Thomas Batuello	2007–2009	Thomas: ages 11–15, Cellist, Bassist
Allie DiMeco	2007–2009	Rosalina: ages 13–16, old Bassist,2nd Guitarist; Nat's Girlfriend (later ex-girlfriend)
David Julian Levi	2007–2009	David: ages 11–15, Keyboardist,
Qaasim Middleton	2007–2009	Qaasim: ages 11–15, Guitarist
Kristina Reyes	March 14- June 13, 2009	Kristina: ages 15–15 Bassist
Cooper Pillot	2007–2009	Cooper: ages 11–15, Band Manager and band member
Jesse Draper	2007–2009	Jesse Cook: ages 19–23 Band tutor and singer/dancer and band member
Michael Wolff	2007–2009	Sonny Wolff: Accordion Player
