= The Bat Mitzvah =

"The Bat Mitzvah" refers to one of the following television episodes:

- "The Bat Mitzvah" (Curb Your Enthusiasm)
- "The Bat Mitzvah" (Entourage)

== See also ==
- "The Bar Mitzvah" (TV episode)
