= Qaasim Middleton =

American actor, singer and musician

- Born: Qaasim Asani Malik Seawright-Middleton; New York City, New York, U.S.
- Occupations: Actor; singer; musician
- Years active: 2005–present

Qaasim Asani Malik Seawright-Middleton is an American actor and musician best known for his role in The Naked Brothers Band.

Qaasim also starred in the documentary movie The Music in Me, and finished eighth place in the fourteenth season of American Idol in 2015.

== Early life ==
Qaasim Middleton was born in Brooklyn, New York. He is the son of actor/musician Keith Middleton, who performed in the New York cast of Stomp, and actress/singer-songwriter Toni Seawright, the first African American Miss Mississippi and a 4th runner-up in Miss America.

Middleton was raised in Bedford-Stuyvesant, Brooklyn. He graduated from Fiorello H. LaGuardia High School of Music & Art and Performing Arts.

== Career ==
Middleton is the guitar player for The Naked Brothers Band. He is the newest member to the band and is the replacement for Cole Hawkins and Joshua Kaye as lead guitarist. In the show, it is revealed that he is greatly influenced by Jimi Hendrix. He was also featured in The Music in Me where he performed as a percussionist.

=== American Idol ===
While in the Top 11, after receiving the lowest number of votes for the week, Middleton was given by the judges the only elimination save of the season and finished in eighth place.

==== Performances and results ====
Episode	Theme	Song choice	Original artist	Order	Result
Audition	Auditioner's Choice	Sir Duke	Stevie Wonder	N/A	Advanced
Hollywood Round – Solo	Auditioner's Choice	Give Me Love	Ed Sheeran	N/A	Advanced
Hollywood Round – Group	Group Performance	"Story of My Life" (with Daniel Seavey, Savion Wright and Trevor Douglas)	"One Direction"	N/A	Advanced
House of Blues (Top 48)	Solo			N/A	Advanced
Top 24 (12 Men)	Personal Choice	"Uptown Funk"	Mark Ronson feat. Bruno Mars	12	Advanced
Top 16	Motown	"I Wish"	Stevie Wonder	7	Safe
Top 12	Back to the Start	"Sir Duke"	Stevie Wonder	8	Safe
Top 11	Party Songs	"Jet"	Paul McCartney	6	Saved
Top 11	Movie Night	"Come Together"	The Beatles	11	Safe
Top 9	Songs from the 1980s	"Addicted to Love"	Robert Palmer	8	Safe
Top 8	Evening with Kelly Clarkson	"Stronger (What Doesn't Kill You)"	Kelly Clarkson	6	Eliminated
Top 8	Billboard Hot 100	"Hey Ya!"	Outkast	N/A	Eliminated

== Discography ==
=== Digital singles ===
Year	Song
2015	"Addicted to Love"
2015	"Stronger (What Doesn't Kill You)

== Filmography ==
- The Naked Brothers Band (TV series) (2007–2009)
- The Naked Brothers Band: Battle of the Bands (2007)
- The Naked Brothers Band: Sidekicks (2008)
- The Naked Brothers Band: Polar Bears (2008)
- The Naked Brothers Band: Mystery Girl (2008)
- The Naked Brothers Band: Operation Mojo (2008)
- The Naked Brothers Band: Naked Idol (2009)
- The Naked Brothers Band: The Premiere (2009)
- American Idol (2015)
- The Get Down (2016)
