= Valley Girl (disambiguation) =

A valley girl is an affluent girl living in the San Fernando Valley.

Valley Girl may also refer to:

- Valley Girl (1983 film), a film starring Nicolas Cage
- Valley Girl (2020 film), a remake of the 1983 film
- "Valley Girls", a 2009 Gossip Girl episode
- The Valley Girl Show, a talk show hosted by Jesse Draper
- Valley Girl, a character in The Catherine Tate Show
- "Valley Girl" (song), a song by Frank Zappa
- Valley Girl, a producer duo consisting of Kyle Shearer and Nate Campany who worked with Allie X, RAYE and Caroline Polachek
