= Valentine Dream Date =

- The Naked Brothers Band episode
- Episode no.: Season 3 Episode 7
- Directed by: Jonathan Judge
- Written by: Magda Liolis and Polly Draper
- Cinematography by: Ken H. Keller
- Editing by: Craig Cobb
- Production code: 308
- Original air date: February 7, 2009

Guest appearance
- Victoria Justice

Episode chronology
← Previous "Secrets of the NBB Summer Tour (TV special)"	Next → "Naked Idol (TV movie)"

"Valentine Dream Date" is the seventh episode and the second holiday special on the part documentary and part rock-mockumentary musical comedy series The Naked Brothers Band, which was created by Polly Draper. The premise of "Valentine's Dream Date" is that Nat is on a dating competition show and his dream date ends up being Victoria Justice, which eventually causes problems with his girl friend Rosalina. Alex also has romantic problems of his own.

"Valentine's Dream Date" is part of the Nickelodeon's Crush Weekend, which consists of episode premieres of different TV shows on TEENick that's hosted by iCarly star Miranda Cosgrove and American Idol seventh season's runner-up David Archuleta. Archuleta guest starred on iCarly during the Crush Weekend marathon in 2009.

== Plot ==
Nat decides to go on a dating game show to win a dream date with Victoria Justice. Later on, Nat's girl friend Rosalina takes a break from her six-month boat cruise to surprise Nat for a visit, but Nat needs to figure out how to explain to her about the dating game show.

Alex also has dating problems himself; Alex helps his babysitter-tutor Jesse get back together with her ex-boyfriend Abdul, by pretending to be Cupid. Abdul ends up falling in love with Jesse, which causes problems for Alex since he always claimed to be her boyfriend, ever since he was 6-and-a-half-years-old.
