= Mystery Girl (The Naked Brothers Band) =

- The Naked Brothers Band episodes
- Episode nos.: Season 3 Episodes 1-2
- Directed by: Jonathan Judge
- Written by: Polly Draper
- Cinematography by: Ken H. Keller
- Editing by: Craig Cobb
- Production code: 301-302/ 995
- Original air date: October 18, 2008

Guest appearances
- Miranda Cosgrove; Martin Johnson

Episode chronology
| ← Previous "Polar Bears" | Next → "Operation Mojo" |

"Mystery Girl" is the first and second episodes of the third season of the television series The Naked Brothers Band, which premiered as a television movie on Nickelodeon on October 18, 2008 to 4 million viewers for children in the 6-11 and 9-14 age groups; it was the top rated episode of the series.

The TV movie episode is in the format of a rock- mockumentary. Mystery Girl was directed by Jonathan Judge and written by Polly Draper, who also serves as showrunner and is the mother to the show's stars Nat Wolff and Alex Wolff, the lead singer-songwriter and drummer, respectively. Miranda Cosgrove and Martin Johnson of Boys Like Girls guest star as themselves.

== Plot ==
The Naked Brothers Band begin filming a motion picture called The Top Secret Naked Brothers Band Musical Mystery Movie.

13-year-old Nat Wolff tries to grapple why Rosalina (Allie DiMeco), aged 15, is trying to get herself written out of the script. To Nat's dismay, he later discovers that Rosalina is going to leave for a 6-month boat cruise around the world for winning a violin competition and he subsequently becomes mad at her.

Christophe (Andrew Keenan-Bolger) is the stubborn movie director. He gets overthrown and replaced by Cooper Pillot, the 13-year-old producer of film and gets Rosalina's new co-star Martin Johnson, aged 23, lead singer of Boys Like Girls to play her on screen boyfriend due to Nat's dismay.

Meanwhile, 10-year-old Alex Wolff panics when he finds out that he has to kiss his skateboarding buddy, Juanita (Teala Dunn), aged 11, for a scene in the film. Much to their relief, it turns out that Juanita did not have to kiss Alex—as it was just a typo by the screenwriter; instead, Juanita only has to kick him.

During the time Nat is moping around, he develops feelings for his new co-star, the renowned actress Miranda Cosgrove, aged 15, and he feels confused after kissing her for a scene in the movie. After that, Miranda suggests that Nat do something very special for Rosalina before she leaves for the cruise.

Nat finally accepts that Rosalina is leaving and decides to perform a serenade with the band for her, by singing his self-written composition, "Your Smile" (with Martin on guitar) outside of her apartment.

== Cast ==
=== Main cast ===
- Nat Wolff as himself
- Alex Wolff as himself
- Thomas Batuello as himself
- Allie DiMeco as Rosalina
- David Levi as himself
- Qaasim Middleton as himself
- Cooper Pillot as himself
- Jesse Draper as Jesse Cook
- Michael Wolff as Dad (Mr. Wolff)

=== Special guest appearance ===
- Miranda Cosgrove as herself
- Martin Johnson as himself

=== Guest starring ===
- Andrew Keenan-Bolger as Christophe
- Randy Blair as Benny
- Mimi Lieber as Choreographer

== Discography ==
| Song | Lead Vocals/Piano/Guitar and Lyrics | Drummer |
|---|---|---|
| "Blueberry Cotton" | Alex Wolff | Alex Wolff |
| "Face in the Hall" | Nat Wolff | Alex Wolff |
| "I Don't Want to Go to School" | Nat Wolff | Alex Wolff |
| "Scary World" | Nat Wolff | Alex Wolff |
| "Your Smile" | Nat Wolff | Alex Wolff |
