= The Naked Brothers Band (TV series) =

American musical comedy television series

- Genre: Mockumentary; Musical; Comedy
- Created by: Polly Draper
- Showrunner: Polly Draper
- Written by: Polly Draper; Magda Liolis; Bob Mittenthal; Michael Rubiner and 2 others
- Directed by: Polly Draper; Melanie Mayron; Jonathan Judge and 2 others
- Starring: Nat Wolff; Alex Wolff; Thomas Batuello; Allie DiMeco; David Levi; Qaasim Middleton; Cooper Pillot; Jesse Draper; Michael Wolff
- Opening theme: "If That's Not Love" by Nat Wolff
- Composers: Nat Wolff; Alex Wolff
- Country of origin: United States
- Original language: English
- No. of seasons: 3
- No. of episodes: 42 (+1 movie) (list of episodes)

Production
- Executive producers: Albie Hecht; Polly Draper
- Producers: Ken H. Keller; Caron Rudner-Keller
- Production locations: Greenpoint, Brooklyn; New York
- Cinematography: Ken H. Keller
- Editor: Craig Cobb
- Camera setup: Film; Single-camera
- Running time: Approx. 30 min. (Episodes); Approx. 1 hr. (Television movies)
- Production companies: KidzHouse Entertainment; Worldwide Biggies

Original release
- Network: Nickelodeon
- Release: February 3, 2007 – June 13, 2009

Related
- The Naked Brothers Band: The Movie

The Naked Brothers Band is an American musical comedy television series created by Polly Draper, which aired on Nickelodeon from February 3, 2007, to June 13, 2009. It depicts the daily lives of Draper's sons, who lead a faux world-renowned children's rock band in New York City. As a mockumentary, the storyline is an embellished satire of their real lives, and the fictional presence of a camera is often acknowledged. The show stars Nat Wolff and Alex Wolff, the lead singer-songwriter and drummer, respectively. Nat's fictional female love interest (Allie DiMeco) and real-life friends Thomas Batuello, David Levi, and Cooper Pillot, as well as Qaasim Middleton—who has no prior acquaintance with the family—are featured as the other band members, with Draper's jazz musician husband Michael Wolff as his sons' widowed accordion-playing dad and her niece Jesse Draper portraying the group's babysitter.

The series is a spin-off of Polly Draper's film of the same name that was picked up by the network, premiering in January 2007. Draper, known for her starring role in Thirtysomething, is the executive producer; she serves as showrunner, and often writer and director. Albie Hecht, former president of Nickelodeon Entertainment and Spike TV, is the other executive producer, under his Worldwide Biggies tag. Michael Wolff, who led the band on The Arsenio Hall Show, serves as co-executive producer and music supervisor, with Draper's brother Tim as consulting producer.

When the show debuted on the channel, it aired two episodes, garnering 3.7 million viewers. Viacom announced that the "series delivered Nickelodeon's highest-rated premiere in seven years" and it became favorable for children aged 6–11. Following the show's premiere, the band's song "Crazy Car" was placed on the Billboard Hot 100, and the first and second season soundtrack albums were on the top 200 Billboard charts. The Naked Brothers Band was nominated for several awards, earning a Broadcast Music, Inc. Award and one Writers Guild of America Award. The series concluded after three seasons because the network began placing high shooting demands on the family that would interfere with the siblings' schooling.

== Development ==
The series' title derived from an incident when the brothers were very young: they came out of the bathtub and said, "We're the naked brothers band!" Although Nat revised the band's title to The Silver Boulders in preschool, Polly Draper revived it as she felt it would be more suitable for the show.

Nat's music, which he has been composing at the piano from the time he was 5, emboldens the scripts Draper writes for many of the episodes. She also acknowledges how the series differs from other children's shows in terms of not using a laugh track.

Draper explains the events that precede the show: "Nat decided he wanted to film his own sitcom, so we did a film called Don't Eat Off My Plate. I pretended to interview his friends and do a documentary." Following the home video, Draper had the idea of making a mockumentary film about the band; she decided to introduce them as music icons like the Beatles. Filmed in mid-2004, the movie was originally independent, and interior scenes were vastly filmed in the family's apartment. Draper's brother Tim, a venture capitalist, invested in the shoot, and she and her husband Michael Wolff's famous celebrity friends are featured making cameo appearances.

In late 2005, Draper and Wolff entered the film at the Hamptons International Film Festival, where it received high applause from the audience. Albie Hecht, former president of film and television entertainment for Nickelodeon, attended the screening. He sold the film to Nickelodeon and proposed developing a television series based on it. The network was eager to buy the film after Hecht and his agent conducted market research that revealed substantial success with children, but when urging the family to start working on the series, Draper and Wolff were initially reluctant to allow their sons into the industry. The family later decided to proceed, however, under certain conditions, which Nickelodeon approved.

== Production ==
Principal photography takes place at Kidzhouse Entertainment, the stage one division of Broadway Stages in Brooklyn, New York over the summer and early fall. That way, the boys are able to continue attending private school throughout most of the year.

Being the showrunner—or leading executive producer, Polly Draper oversees the casting, manages the writers' room, edits scripts, and conveys storyline ideas for each episode. In addition to Draper serving as head writer, the other writers for the series have previously scripted other television shows for Nickelodeon. They include Magda Liolis, Michael Rubiner and Bob Mittenthal, and Will McRobb and Chris Viscardi. McRobb and Viscardi only penned the script for the first season's two-part episode television movie "Battle of the Bands". By the third season, Mittenthal emerged as a senior writer, earning the title of co-executive producer.

Albie Hecht is the other executive producer; his production company Worldwide Biggies distributes the series, in association with Nickelodeon Television. Michael Wolff, a jazz musician often noted for leading the band on The Arsenio Hall Show, also serves as co-executive producer, with Tim Draper as consulting producer. Production facilities producers Ken H. Keller—also the cinematographer—and his wife, Caron Rudner, own the filming studio, Kidzhouse Entertainment, which is another distributor for the show.

Polly Draper and Melanie Mayron, both known for co-starring in Thirtysomething, directed the first season. During the second season, Jonathan Judge was added as a third director. The last episode Mayron directed for that season, and thus for the series, featured her as an estranged fan on the radio, providing the voice over. By the third season, Draper and Judge directed every other television movie, with Mark Salisbury directing the initial animated special, and Rosario Roveto, Jr. directing the concluding episode.

Draper managed to also keep an eye on her two boys. For example, the cast was filming an episode that featured the band recording a video; Nat, who did not want to make out in the scene due to his crush Rosalina watching, mistakenly smooches her. He then explains to his mother that he was confused as to what the instructions were. The scene being filmed was that of the first season's ninth episode "First Kiss (On the Lips, That is)", which was directed by Melanie Mayron. In another instance, during production for the fourth episode of the second season, as the boys play restlessly on a purple sofa, their mother (who was not directing the episode) admonishes them over the loudspeaker by saying, "Both of you, try to smile more."

=== Casting ===
According to New York Times author Felicia R. Lee, the siblings act "chatty, guileless, fun-loving", much as they do in their genuine lives. She also notes that, of the show's characters, "no one over 18 has much sense." Draper's role as creator—the developer of the original characters—allowed her to contemplate her boys' fictional birth mother as deceased; her name is never revealed. However, in the show, the boys' father is infatuated with an estranged lady named Betty. Moreover, although portraying fictional characters, the ensemble cast—including Qaasim Middleton, as well as real-life friends David Levi, Joshua Kaye, Thomas Batuello, and Cooper Pillot—keep their full names on-screen. Nonetheless, Allie DiMeco plays Rosalina; the siblings' cousin Jesse Draper portrays Jesse Cook; and Michael Wolff plays the siblings' father, Sonny, the latter whom Draper notes she wrote similar to that of a child.

The Timmerman Brothers—a band no longer famous—consists of three siblings, who in real life are Polly's nephews, Nat and Alex's cousins, and thus Jesse's brothers and cousin. In addition, Jesse's real-life father, Polly's brother, and thus Nat and Alex's uncle reoccurs as the school principal. Jesse's sister and cousin have been added as recurring stars during the second season. They play Jesse's sisters named Tessy and Bessy who appear as the dancing girls in Alex's new music video.

In addition, Qaasim's real-life mother, the actress and singer-songwriter Toni Seawright, as well as his younger brother Kahlil (also an actor and musician) appear as themselves during the second season, while Seawright reprises her role in the third season. Thomas' real-life younger brother, John, also reoccurs as himself during the second season.

During a family interview in January 2008 by New York Times reporter Jacques Steinberg, Nat notes the French bulldog E.T., who plays David Levi's dog in the show, belongs to the Draper-Wolff family in real life.

=== Post-production ===
==== Editing ====
Craig Cobb is the picture editor for the series; he was also the assistant editor for Sex and the City. Cobb worked with supervising sound editor Louis Bertini, who had been the editor for Sex and The City. Of the editing process, Bertini explains that editing the show was not much different from editing Sex and the City; they brought a similar "approach and constriction to the audio elements", although unlike Sex in the City, the show had a "larger cartoon element". However, Cobb considered the editing to be a challenge because he felt that a certain degree of unscripted "magic on set" existed that required more work. Because most of the children on the series are not professional actors—in addition to the music that was to be added—the editing process created a situation that was somewhat "messy". Nonetheless, Cobb believed the combination of factors created a "magic" of its own "and it's what makes this show really shine".

When an episode completed filming, Cobb edited on the Final Cut Pro application, which normally took four days to complete. Bertini—who spent the same amount of time editing—then converted unnecessary script and added sound effects. Cobb says, "The 16:9 SD workflow was the plan for the 2008 season, but that has changed. We're working in 4:3 SD with the ProRes 422 codec, so we're cutting in a broadcast-quality format that we'll later output without having to recapture all the footage."

==== Music ====
Nat and Alex sing, compose, and perform all of the show's music, with Nat's song "If That's Not Love" serving as the theme song. Their father contributes the underscore and supervises the music; he also produces it with Michael A. Levine. The series' music editor, John Davis coordinates the songs' musical numbers, and Amy Cervini and Russ Spiegel are the music instructors.

== Plot ==
Season	Episodes	Originally released	
Season	Episodes	First released	Last released
Pilot		January 27, 2007	
1	13	February 3, 2007	October 20, 2007
2	15	January 21, 2008	June 6, 2008
3	11	October 18, 2008	June 13, 2009
TV Specials	3	December 1, 2007	January 31, 2009

=== Pilot ===
The pilot was originally an independent film shot in mid-2004 depicting Nat and Alex Wolff when they were nine and six years old respectively, along with Nat's friends and the other band members Joshua Kaye, David Levi, Thomas Batuello, and Cooper Pillot. They film a documentary about their world-renowned band, The Silver Boulders, as they fracture due to Nat's song about a girl named Rosalina (Allie DiMeco). Later on, the band ends up adding Rosalina and Cole Hawkins, reuniting as The Naked Brothers Band.

Several celebrities either acknowledge their admiration for the band or appear in other supporting roles. In real life, they have either worked or are friends with the Draper-Wolff family. These special guests are Cindy Blackman, Ann Curry, Arsenio Hall, Ricki Lake, Cyndi Lauper, Julianne Moore, Brent Popolizio, Tony Shalhoub, Lauper's husband David Thornton, Uma Thurman, jazz singer Nancy Wilson, and the ensemble cast of Thirtysomething (particularly, Timothy Busfield, Draper, Mel Harris, Peter Horton, Melanie Mayron, Ken Olin, and Patricia Wettig).

It premiered as a television movie special on January 27, 2007.

=== Season 1: 2007 ===
The first season aired thirteen episodes and a television special. It debuted in February 2007 and originally concluded with the tenth episode, "The Song", in June; however, a two-part episode, television movie "Battle of the Bands" and one additional episode titled "Alien Clones" broadcast that following October.

The first season features Nat and his younger brother Alex, who are 11 and 8 years old, respectively. David, Thomas, and Cooper are also 11. Qaasim is 12 and Rosalina is 13. Daniel Raymont plays the role of the music video director, and Tuffy Questall portrays Tuffy, the driver of the band's psychedelic bus. The first season also has guest appearances by television personality Ryan Seacrest, radio host Matt Pinfield, rap artist Snoop Dogg, comedian George Lopez, and actor and musician Keli Price.

The first season's premise is that the group is recording their first studio album as well as starring in several music videos to promote it. In the first episode "VMAs", Alex is horrified by his horoscope Jesse reads to him, and the band's music video for their song "Banana Smoothie" wins an MTV Video Music Award at the end. In later episodes, Nat's initial attempts at stand-up comedy fails before receiving advice from George Lopez. Throughout the season, Nat does not like when David and Thomas ridicule his affection for Rosalina. Although neither admits their feelings for each other, it becomes quite obvious that Nat and Rosalina like each other. As time goes on, Rosalina kisses Nat on the lips in his dressing room.

Moreover, Alex becomes mad and runs away when Jesse dates The Timmerman Brothers. Along the way, Alex becomes friends with an orphan named Juanita at a skatepark. When the boys' father arrives back from his overnight vacation, he starts dating an estranged lady named Betty, who Cooper and Jesse initially hired to clean the mess in the Wolff family's apartment without much success. In addition to a "Battle of The Bands" between The Naked Brothers Band and The LA Surfers (the latter featuring 16-year-old singer Bobby Love, a manipulative con artist who tries to hit on Rosalina), the season ends with Nat and his band performing at a charity event they put together for Juanita and her foster family.

=== Season 2: 2008 ===
During the second season, thirteen episodes and two television specials aired, beginning with the two-part episode, television movie "Sidekicks" in January 2008 before ending that following June with a three-part episode, another television movie named "Polar Bears".

In the second season, Nat, Thomas, David, and Cooper are twelve, Alex is nine, Rosalina is fourteen and Qaasim is thirteen. Guest stars for the season include syndicated cartoonist Jules Feiffer, musician Joel Madden, skateboarder Tony Hawk, George Lopez, Matt Pinfield, and musician Phil Collins. During the first half of the season, Daniel Raymont portrays Wing with Teala Dunn and Emily Richardson returning as Juanita and Patty Scoggins, respectively. When the band goes on tour, the tour driver Tuffy (Tuffy Questall) takes on more of a lead recurring role.

The second season begins with a school masquerade party and prom. In later episodes, Nat, Alex, and Cooper have dates at a local movie theater; during a live talk show, the siblings, alongside Joel Madden and a girl, who is a critical news reporter, compose a song together at the piano; Cooper has a Bar Mitzvah; and Mr. Wolff's girl friend rejects him after meeting his twin brother, Miles, who is a successful jazz pianist. In addition, the band starts prepping for their tour with several band rehearsals. Prior to leaving on their tour bus, the band members are conflicted with personal issues: Mr. Wolff is still coping from his break up with Betty, David is upset about leaving his dog, E.T. behind, and Rosalina is worried about the possibility of not saying "good bye" to her father. Nonetheless, all of their concerns work themselves out: George Lopez advises Mr. Wolff to continue his passion for playing the accordion despite his break up, Tuffy ends up allowing David to bring his dog, and Rosalina's father makes it to the bus stop before the bus leaves.

Following several concert performances (including one at the Rock and Roll Hall of Fame in Cleveland, Ohio, as well as a state county fair), the television movie "Polar Bears" depicts the ending of the band's tour in New Orleans, Louisiana, where they — along with their babysitter, Jesse — reunite with the siblings' father and old family friends of the Wolffs' who are victims of Hurricane Katrina. On the ride down there, Jesse inadvertently has Alex watch An Inconvenient Truth and, after viewing it, he becomes very concerned about the polar bears potentially becoming extinct due to global warming. During their visit, Mr. Wolff's friend's older daughter, as well as Nat, Qaasim, and Rosalina encounter misinterpretations over their romantic interests before they are resolved, and the band ends up donating the money raised from their performance at an elaborate-styled ballroom to a charity supporting climate change.

=== Season 3: 2008–09 ===
The third season began with the television movie "Mystery Girl", which premiered in October 2008. It also aired three other television movies, a animated special, a special webisode, and three other episodes, concluding with "No School's Fools Day" in June 2009.

In this season, Nat, Thomas, David, and Cooper are 13 with Qaasim being 14, while Alex is 10 and Rosalina is 15. The season features an array of celebrities making cameo appearances, including actresses Miranda Cosgrove and Whoopi Goldberg, singer Natasha Bedingfield, and musicians David Desrosiers and Simon Kirke. Other celebrity appearances include musicians Tobin Esperance and Questlove, actor and musician Leon Thomas, actress Victoria Justice, and talk show host Dave Attell. Daniel Raymont, Tuffy Questall, Teala Dunn, Catherine Curtin, and Matt Pinfield all return, with Andrew Keenan-Bolger portraying Christophe, the director of the new Magical Mystery Girl Movie.

The new season depicts the band shooting their initial theatrical film called the Magical Mystery Girl Movie. Nat stars as Daniel, Rosalina as herself, Miranda Cosgrove as Daniel's girl friend, Alex as Oliver, Juanita as the girl in Oliver's new music video, with Mr. Wolff and Jesse playing themselves and Principle Schmoke and Tuffy portraying sumo wrestlers in diapers. Christophe is the stubborn director; he is later overthrown and replaced by Cooper, the producer of the movie. Christophe appears again in "The Premiere" when he steals the movie's metal film cassette.

On the other hand, Rosalina temporarily leaves the band to travel on a worldwide cruise. During her trip, the band members read the newspaper and the front cover depicts Rosalina kissing a French man. When Rosalina returns to visit, she and Nat have an internal dispute and Rosalina subsequently quits the band. Because of this, the group must find a new bass player. Cooper calls for a "Naked Idol" contest and the outfit selects Kristina Reyes as their new bassist. However, Nat later makes up with Rosalina and she rejoins the band while retaining Kristina as well. "The Premiere" television movie ends with them watching the Magical Mystery Girl Movie in the theaters as well as the band performing Nat's new song "Just a Girl I Know".

== Cast ==
=== Main cast ===
- Nat Wolff stars as himself, who is the incisive, lead singer-songwriter and keyboardist for the band. He plays guitar, though, for such songs as "Taxi Cab", "I'll Do Anything", "Curious", and "I Feel Alone". Nicknamed "The Girl Magnet", his crush on bandmate Rosalina emboldens his love songs, and she even kissed him on the lips in his dressing room during the first season. In the second season, Nat and Rosalina go to prom together, then on a triple date, and in the final television movie "Polar Bears", the two become a couple. However, by the third season, their relationship becomes strained when Rosalina embarks on a six-month boat cruise around the world.
- Alex Wolff stars as himself, the dark brown, puffy curly-haired younger brother of Nat's, who portrays the outfit's highly energetic drummer. He switches to keyboards for the following songs he writes and sings: "Changing", "Why", "Jesse", and "All I Needed". Because of his exuberance, he has a number of fake tattoos; Alex also wears socks tied around his ankles, and a red, white and blue do-rag on his head during the first season. Throughout the series, he has a deep affection for Jesse and considers her to be his girlfriend. He also disapproves of her dating other men, including The Timmerman Brothers.
- Thomas Batuello stars as himself, playing the group's cellist. In the show, he often coordinates mischievous acts with David. During the first season, Thomas and David claim not to take an interest in girls, even though they once pretended to drown at the beach to get the attention of two girls on a boat. They often ridicule Nat because of his feelings for Rosalina too. By the second season's episode "Cleveland", Thomas, nonetheless, becomes envy of Nat for obtaining all the affection from their female fans. After Rosalina leaves for a six-month cruise around the world during the third season, Thomas becomes the band's temporary bassist.
- Allie DiMeco stars as Rosalina, the bassist and Nat's highly noted love interest. Because of her perplexing relationship with Nat, she quits the band twice. First, after becoming involved with a manipulative con artist named Bobby Love, the lead singer of the punk rock group The LA Surfers, she encounters an internal dispute with Nat and subsequently leaves the group. After Bobby purloins her music sheet and performs the song live at the "Battle of The Bands" competition, however, his true identity is revealed and Rosalina instantly approaches Nat sobbing in his arms while asking for his forgiveness, thus rejoining the outfit during the first season. When Rosalina returns from her long cruise in the third season, she and Nat have an internal dispute about her being depicted in the newspaper kissing a French man and subsequently breaks up with Nat, thereby quitting the band again. Under Cooper's guidance, the outfit develops a nationwide singing competition to replace Rosalina, choosing Kristina as their new bassist. As soon as the reconstructed band settles in, an abrupt Rosalina asks to rejoin and so she becomes their second guitarist.
- David Levi stars as himself, a blond-haired boy with glasses who plays the band's keyboardist. In addition to his involvement in all of Thomas' pranks, David admires his own dog, E.T.
- Qaasim Middleton stars as himself, an African-American child with dreadlocks who plays the guitar for the group. In the show, he is known for being quite skillful at flirting with girls and is highly intelligent.
- Cooper Pillot stars as himself and is the band's manager, dressing in a suit, as well as wearing large sunglasses. Throughout the series' entire three seasons, Cooper is attracted to a girl named Patty Scoggins.
- Jesse Draper stars as Jesse Cook, the band's babysitter and tutor who tends to wear mini-skirts and has many tattoos. Because Jesse is not very intelligent, Rosalina and Qaasim grade the band members' school assignments for her. She calls Alex her "little boyfriend", and much to his noted disapproval, Jesse dates The Timmerman Brothers—Donnie, Johnny, and Billy.
- Michael Wolff stars as Dad (also known as "Mr. Wolff" or "Sonny"), Nat and Alex's inept accordion-playing widowed father. He embarrasses his sons on many occasions; for example, he sometimes tries to appear in the band's performances by playing the accordion. Sonny has performed at the Hoboken Rathskeller restaurant, and he dates an estranged woman named Betty, but she later breaks up with him for his twin brother Miles.

=== Recurring characters ===
(In order of appearance):

- Daniel Raymont plays the role of the music video director, appearing and talking quite similar to Borat Sagdiyev in the first season; Wing during the second season; and Abdul in the third-season episode titled "Valentine Dream Date".
- Tuffy Questell stars as Tuffy, the band's tour bus driver during the first two seasons. He was also featured during the third season.
- Tim Draper portrays Joe Schmoke, the principal of Amigos Elementary, Middle, and High School.
- Billy Draper, Adam Draper, and Coulter Mulligan play the roles of Billy, Donnie, and Johnny Timmerman, all of whom are nonsensical. Together, they formed The Timmerman Brothers, an initially quite successful musical group whose popularity diminished after their voices deepened during puberty.
- Teala Dunn stars as Juanita, Alex's skateboard buddy and female interest.
- Catherine Curtin portrays Betty, the noted estranged lady who wears a blonde wig. Although initially being hired by Cooper as a maid, she made excuses by explaining how she is technically a "cleaning specialist", and therefore, does not "actually clean"; rather, she "guides others on how they should clean." Betty then dates Sonny and plays the ukulele in their two-member band, The Honey Bunnies. However, the other characters strongly dislike their music. In the second-season episode "Uncle Miles", Betty leaves Sonny for his jazz musician twin brother Miles before reappearing again in the third-season episode "Valentine Dream Date".
- Emily Richardson plays Patty Scoggins, Cooper's romantic interest. Initially known as "Ms. Scoggins", she first appears as the representative for Little Kids Rock in the first season television movie "Battle of The Bands".
- Eleanor Draper and Lisa Mulligan portray Tessy and Bessy, Jesse's sisters and the dancing girls in some of the band's music videos during the second season.
- Kristina Reyes stars as herself, first appearing in the third season television movie "Naked Idol". When she is chosen to fulfill Rosalina's spot as the band's bassist, Nat initially acts disrespectful to her because he is upset about the departure of, and his break up with, Rosalina. However, Nat and Kristina have a talk and a friendship forms between them. During their chat, she explained to Nat how she always dreamed of playing in the band and admired him dearly after hearing his song "Rosalina" broadcast on the radio when she was ten years old. In the television movie "The Premiere", Rosalina asks to rejoin the band and they decide to keep Kristina as the bassist, with Rosalina returning as their second guitarist.

=== Special appearance ===
The series often features celebrities making cameo appearances, most of whom play themselves.

Actor	Role	Seasons	Episode	Notes
Matt Pinfield	Himself	1; 2; 3	Episode 1, VMA's; Episode 9, First Kiss (On The Lips, That Is); Episode 11–12, Battle of the Bands; Episode 13–15, Polar Bears; Episode 5, Supertastic 6	Frequent guest star
Snoop Dogg	Himself	1	Episode 1, VMA's	Minor appearance
Ryan Seacrest	Himself	1	Episode 1, VMA's	Voice over
George Lopez	Himself	1; 2	Episode 3, Nat Is A Stand-Up Guy; Episode 9, Everyone's Cried At Least Once; Episode 13–15, Polar Bears	Recurring guest star
Keli Price	Bobby Love	1	Episode 11–12, Battle of the Bands	Played chief antagonist and leader of the punk rock group The LA Surfers in the television movie special.
Albie Hecht	Interviewer #1	1	Television special, Been There, Rocked That	In real life, Hecht is the executive producer of the series, under his Worldwide Biggies label.
Magda Liolis	Interviewer #3	1	Television special, Been There, Rocked That	In real life, Liolis is a writer for the series.
Russ Spiegel	Interviewer #6	1	Television special, Been There, Rocked That	In real life, Spiegel is a music instructor for the series.
Jules Feiffer	Himself	2	Episode 4, Three is Enough	In real life, Fieffer—alongside Ann Curry—attended Nat and his band, The Silver Boulders' benefit concert shortly following the 9/11 terrorist attacks; it was staged outside the Draper-Wolff family's apartment.
Joel Madden	Himself	2	Episode 5, The Talk Show	Played leading role in episode
Tony Hawk	Himself	2	Episode 6, The Bar Mitzvah	Minor role
Melanie Mayron	Interviewer	2	Episode 10, Cleveland	Mayron played the voice over as an estranged fan who claimed to be from Mars. This was the last episode Mayron directed for the series; she starred alongside The Naked Brothers Band creator and showrunner, Draper, who is also the stars real life mother, on the ABC television drama Thirtysomething.
Phil Collins	Himself	2	Episode 13–15, Polar Bears	He was televised on the news, discussing his dislike for Alex when the reporters gossiped that he said "[The Naked Brothers Band] is bigger than Santa Clause."
Donna Lynn Leavy	Onita	2	Episode 13-15, Polar Bears	Leavy portrayed an old family friend of the Wolffs' whose family are victims of Hurricane Katrina in New Orleans, Louisiana.
Grace Cartwright	Little Grace	2	Episode 13-15, Polar Bears	Cartwright played Onita's eldest daughter.
Saoirse Scott	Big Ella	2	Episode 13-15, Polar Bears	Scott appeared as Onita's youngest daughter and Little Grace's sister.
Andrew Keenan-Bolger	Christophe	3	Episode 1-2, Mystery Girl; Episode 11-12, The Premiere	Keenan-Bolger played Christophe, the director of the new "Magical Mystery Girl Movie" before being overthrown and replaced by the band manager and film's producer Cooper Pillot. He reappears in the television movie "The Premiere" by attempting to steal the film cassette prior to the movie's theatrical premiere.
Miranda Cosgrove	Herself	3	Episode 1–2, Mystery Girl	She portrayed the girl who was to kiss Nat in the new Magical Mystery Girl Movie.
Natasha Bedingfield	Herself	3	Episode 6, Christmas Special	Bedingfield sang alongside Nat and Leon Thomas III for Nat's new composition "Yes We Can". Prior to the episode's broadcast, Bedingfield appeared in a music video of the same name with Nat.
Whoopi Goldberg	Herself	3	Episode 6, Christmas Special	Goldberg is the presenter for the homeless boy (Thomas) at a Christmas celebration and announces Nat, Bedingfield, and Thomas to the piano as they perform "Yes We Can".
Leon Thomas III	Leon Williams	3	Episode 6, Christmas Special	He portrays the homeless boy who performs "Yes We Can" alongside Nat and Bedingfield.
Craig Cobb	Himself	3	Episode 7, Secrets of the NBB Summer Tour (Webisode)	In real life, Cobb is the editor of the series.
Victoria Justice	Herself	3	Episode 8, Valentine Dream Date; Episode 11–12, The Premiere	Minor appearance. In "The Premiere", she portrays one of many girls who desire to walk with Nat across the red carpet during the Magical Mystery Girl Movie premiere in theaters.
David Desrosiers	Himself	3	Episode 9–10, Naked Idol	He auditions for a chance to replace Rosalina as the bassist during the "Naked Idol" try-outs.
Tobin Esperance	Himself	3	Episode 9–10, Naked Idol	He auditions for a chance to replace Rosalina as the bassist during the "Naked Idol" try-outs.
Dave Attell	Himself	3	Episode 9–10, Naked Idol	He announces Nat Wolff, Alex Wolff, and the "Naked Idol" contestants to the stage.
Ahmir "Questlove" Thompson	Himself	3	Episode 13, No School's Fools Day	
Simon Kirke	Himself	3	Episode 13, No School's Fools Day	

== Release ==
=== National broadcast ===
Region	Network(s)	Series premiere
United States	Nickelodeon/TeenNick	February 3, 2007
Canada	YTV	2007
UK and Ireland	Nickelodeon	May 29, 2007
Australia and New Zealand	Nickelodeon	February 23, 2008
Germany	Nick	October 20, 2007
Spanish America	Nickelodeon	July 21, 2007
The Netherlands	Nickelodeon	April 2007
Brazil	Nickelodeon	July 21, 2007
Israel	Nickelodeon	2009
Pakistan	Nickelodeon	August 20, 2007
Croatia	Nickelodeon	2007
Bulgaria	Nickelodeon	November 16, 2007
Greece	Nickelodeon	April 20, 2012

=== Season debut and release ===
Season	Episodes	First air date	Last air date	DVD release date
Season 1	13	February 3, 2007	October 20, 2007	January 8, 2008
Season 2	15	January 21, 2008	June 6, 2008	October 21, 2008
Season 3	12	October 18, 2008	June 13, 2009	N/A

=== TV movie premiere and home media ===
Season	Title	Episode #	First air date	DVD Release
1	The Naked Brothers Band: The Movie	Pilot	January 27, 2007	April 3, 2007
1	"Battle of the Bands"	11–12	October 6, 2007	September 4, 2007
2	"Sidekicks"	14–15	January 21, 2008	N/A
2	"Polar Bears"	26–28	June 6, 2008	June 17, 2008
3	"Mystery Girl"	29–30	October 18, 2008	N/A
3	"Operation Mojo"	31–32	November 22, 2008	N/A
3	"Naked Idol"	36–37	March 14, 2009	N/A
3	"The Premiere"	38–39	April 11, 2009	N/A

=== Other media ===
- The Naked Brothers Band: The Video Game was released into stores on October 20, 2008.

== Reception ==
Albie Hecht foreshadowed the success of the series after watching the film at the Hamptons International Film Festival. In an article, he told New York Times reporter Felicia R. Lee: "They're just real: real brothers, real friends; it's all the stuff kids do when they're hanging out on the playground. The idea that you're watching a documentary is so much fun. Then you put them into that fantasy of being a world-famous rock band, and that's the sauce that makes it work."

Moreover, before the show's debut, "a fan recognized Nat and Alex in a Florida hotel. She sent them a note: 'Are you the Naked Brothers?' 'They were so excited,' Polly Draper recalled. 'The show hasn't even aired yet and now walking down the streets kids are calling out their names. They can't believe it.' "

According to Nat, "After the show came on, people began to really treat us like huge rock stars. They'd scream on the street, and we'd look behind us to see what they were screaming about, because we didn't realize it was us." The family encountered an incident in the past; they had to delist and change their phone number in Lower Manhattan because fans worldwide were calling their apartment relentlessly. Draper recalls, "Little girls would call and say, 'Helloooo, is [Nat] there? We just love him.' The only thing that's comforting is, they're pretty harmless at that age."

=== Critical response ===
On January 25, 2007, Felicia R. Lee from The New York Times called both the film and television series, "an ebullient mock documentary", while Variety reporter Laura Fries states, "the band does its best to re-create the frenetic whimsy of The Monkees while maintaining its kid-like sensibilities. The plots are of little consequence and, like The Monkees, the show is an amalgam of silent movie shenanigans, music videos and cartoon-like antics." She also acknowledges how "satire for kids is tricky business, especially when the target audience is still grappling with issues regarding truth and imagination vs. reality. This fake rock 'n' roll world these young kids are thrown into makes for a creative premise, but often puts the stars a little too close to adult situations. [T]he physical comedy and gross out humor works, although at times, 'Naked Brothers Band' can feel like an inside joke gone awry."

In regard to the songs featured in the series, Laura Fries notes, "The songs, actually written by Nat, may not top the charts, but they're far more tolerable than Kidz Bop and are hard to shake once the show is over. Amazingly, all of the kids here [are] real musicians. If Draper really wants to create a show business legacy, she should sell her secrets on how to get kids to practice their musical instruments." According to a review of the first season soundtrack album by Entertainment Weekly reporter Jonathan Bernstein, "If you're the parent of a preteen, you'll assume the Nakeds are this century's Hanson. Yet after perpetual exposure, you'll appreciate the difference — the Nakeds have more psychedelic leanings, and Nat has a McCartneyesque way with a melody — and ultimately agree that they're cuter than anything ever." The Associated Press even states that "Nat's knack for hooks and harmonies is impressive for fans of any age. Clearly inspired by their heroes, [T]he Beatles and Bob Marley, the boys paint a vast musical landscape, ranging from the introspective, Nat-penned ballad 'I Indeed Can See' to the whimsical electronic comic relief of 'Alien Clones', courtesy of Alex."

=== Awards and accolades ===
On October 23, 2005, The Naked Brothers Band: The Movie won the audience award for a family feature film at the Hamptons International Film Festival. Of Hecht's attendance, he said, "I could see there was an audience for this. They're real kids, real brothers, making real music."

Draper received a Writers Guild Award nomination for the episode "Nat is a Stand-Up Guy" in the section of Children's Episodic and Specials in 2008. The following year, in 2009, the television movie "Polar Bears" won Draper a WGA for Children's Script — Long Form or Special; it was the only one nominated in the category. In 2007, Nat was nominated for Best TV Actor at the Nickelodeon Kids' Choice Awards in the United Kingdom. Moreover, the adult Wolff and his sons received a Broadcast Music, Inc. Cable Award for their work on the show's music. In 2008, the series' cast performed at the KCAs in United States; the following year, Nat was nominated for Favorite TV Actor.

=== Soundtrack and online merchandise ===
On February 17, 2007, "Crazy Car" sold more than 100 thousand downloads online; it was placed on the Billboard Hot 100 charts for seven weeks, and the track was featured on Nickelodeon's Kids' Choice, Vol 3. The first and second season soundtrack albums, The Naked Brothers Band (2007) and I Don't Want to Go to School (2008), also ranked the 23rd spot on the top 200 Billboard charts, accumulating over 500 thousand sales. The producers of the albums were Michael Wolff and Michael A. Levine, and distributed by Nick Records and Columbia Records.

On October 8, 2007—the day before The Naked Brothers Band debut album released into stores, the band had an autograph signing for 1,500 fans at Virgin Megastore in Times Square, New York City; they also performed their original song "I'm Out" to a live audience on Good Morning America. Additionally, the group's first MTV music video released for their song "If That's Not Love". To praise the release of their second season soundtrack album, the band performed their song, "I Don't Want to Go to School" live on the NBC morning show Today.

During the same month, Nick.com's message boards had 5.3 million pages viewed, causing online madness. The show has three video games online that have been played about 24 million times. Moreover, fans have downloaded over 800 thousand podcasts.

Their unreleased soundtrack, titled Throwbacks, for the third season was made available free of a charge on their website as an online download in October 2013. The album artist is Nat and Alex Wolff, but it took four years to develop due to the series ending in June 2009.

=== U.S. television ratings ===
The film premiered on the network to 2.7 million viewers, and placed the top 10 spot on the Nielsen VideoScan children's non-theatrical DVD charts. It was also broadcast four times, producing a total viewership of 14 million.

When the show debuted on the channel, it aired two episodes, averaging out to a total viewership of 3.7 million. The first, "VMA's", drew 3.5 million viewers. "Wolff Brother's Cry Wolff" then followed which garnered a total of 3.8 million viewers; the episode gave the channel its most favorable ratings in seven years, and was among the quickest starts for the network. It also acquired the channel as favorable for children aged 6–11; Nielsen Media Research calculates—of in that age range—2 million have tuned in to the series' premiere, with 1.3 million watching the following 8 episodes. For all ages, most of the first season attracted 2.8 million viewers per week. From February 12 to 15 in 2007, repeats for the series garnered 4 million viewers; it was the second most-viewed program on the network, and among the top six shows for the week in the 6–11 and 9–14 age groups. According to a PRNewswire article in 2007, the series "quickly became one of the top programs for tweens on television".

For all ages, the season one television movie "Battle of the Bands" was quite successful, garnering a viewership of 3.8 million. The premiere of the second season television movie "Sidekicks" aired to a total of 3.6 million viewers, with the season's finale television movie "Polar Bears" drawing 1.7 million viewers for children aged 6–11; the latter was the second most watched show for the week in that age group. The series reached its peak with the debut of the third season television movie "Mystery Girl", producing a total viewership of 4 million. A month later, the television movie "Operation Mojo" was broadcast to an audience of 2.8 million viewers. When the season three episode "Valentine Dream Date" aired, it was also successful; 3.2 million people watched it.

Although the show's viewership ratings remained consistently high over the course of its full three season run, network bosses wanted the family to shoot thirty television movies for the fourth season. Nevertheless, prior agreements had already been stipulated between Draper, Wolff, and the management at Nickelodeon that filming would not conflict with the boys' school schedule by ensuring production be limited to approximately thirteen episodes each season. When network executives chose no longer to adhere to these terms, Draper and Wolff opted to cancel the series in 2009. Details of the cancellation remained undisclosed by both parties involved until Nat revealed the incident to the press in 2013.
