= Nat & Alex Wolff discography =

Discography of music albums

This is a discography of albums made by Nat & Alex Wolff.

== The Naked Brothers Band ==
The Naked Brothers Band is the debut soundtrack by The Naked Brothers Band. It consists of songs from Season 1, which ran from February 3, 2007 to October 20, 2007.

== I Don't Want to Go to School ==
I Don't Want to Go to School is the second soundtrack album by The Naked Brothers Band. It contains songs from Season 2.

== Throwbacks ==
Throwbacks is the third soundtrack album by The Naked Brothers Band. Season 3 of the show aired from October 18, 2008 to June 13, 2009. After the band's split in 2009 it was originally cancelled, until it was announced on September 19, 2013 to be released as a Nat & Alex Wolff album instead of a Naked Brothers Band album on October 15, 2013.

== Black Sheep ==
Black Sheep is the debut studio album by the sibling duo, Nat & Alex Wolff. This is the brothers' first album since the departure of their Nickelodeon series, The Naked Brothers Band.

Cities + It's Just Love-2014 Last Station + Rules-2014 Where I'm going + Rock Star-2014

Nat & Alex Wolff Self Titled Album released 16th January 2016
