= Polar Bears (The Naked Brothers Band) =

2008 episodes of the television series

- The Naked Brothers Band episodes
- Episode nos.: Season 2 Episodes 26, 27 and 28
- Directed by: Polly Draper
- Written by: Polly Draper
- Cinematography by: Ken H. Keller
- Editing by: Craig Cobb
- Production code: 211-213/ 996
- Original air date: June 6, 2008
- Running time: 67 min

Guest appearances
- Phil Collins; George Lopez; Matt Pinfield

Episode chronology
← Previous "County Fair Concert Special"	Next → "Mystery Girl"

"Polar Bears" is the thirteenth, fourteenth and fifteenth episodes of the second season of the television series The Naked Brothers Band, which premiered as a television movie special on Nickelodeon on June 6, 2008 to 1.7 million viewers for children aged 6–11; it was the second most watched show for the week in that age group.

The TV movie episode is in the format of a rock-mockumentary. Polar Bears is written and directed by Polly Draper, who also serves as showrunner, and the show stars her sons, Nat Wolff and Alex Wolff, the lead singer-songwriter and drummer, respectively. The TV movie tells of the siblings' who, along with their bandmates, take a ride on their tour bus to New Orleans, Louisiana. The plot chronicles around Alex's ambitions to save the polar bears by preserving the environment, as well as a conflict in which Rosalina is suspicious of Nat when he becomes very close to his childhood friend "Little" Grace (Grace Cartwright). George Lopez and Phil Collins are featured making cameo appearances.

Polar Bears earned Draper a Writers Guild Award for Children's Script: Long Form or Special.

== Plot ==
Brothers Nat and Alex Wolff, aged 12 and 9 respectively, are members of a rock band called The Naked Brothers Band. The film begins with the group—along with their ditzy nanny, Jesse—eating outside on a table in Pawnee Junction, Missouri. The cellist, Thomas, shows the audience a magazine which features a "Nat Wolff Exclusive." It shows "five reasons why Nat Wolff isn't perfect," and much to Nat's denial, the first one is: "he slurps his soup."

The group has been touring the country in their psychedelic tour bus and their final stop is to New Orleans, Louisiana.

While they are traveling on the bus, the band's 21-year-old babysitter Jesse (Jesse Draper) conducts a "manners class" for everyone, apart from Alex because he is "too young to play with knives". This is arranged by Jesse, as Nat's table manners are not approved by the restaurant ballroom. While Jesse was in the middle of her lesson, Alex walked into the room. Jesse urged Alex to watch a digital versatile disc that she bought for him. Alex replies: "And what movie is this my lovely sugar plum?" Jesse recalled that a salesman from Blockbuster recommended buying this old humorous film called The Awful Truth, starring Cary Grant. After watching it, Alex comes back into the room explaining that she made a mistake; the film was actually called An Inconvenient Truth that featured Al Gore. Alex also recalls that "...Polar bears die in it, because the earth is too hot so their homes melt." That night, Alex becomes overly concerned about the polar bears losing their homes, so Nat suggests they gather all the money they make from their upcoming concert and give the proceeds to the environment. The next morning, Alex shows the viewers a list of things that he will be doing to preserve the environment. He wrote it on his arm so he does not waste paper and it includes recycling and not taking baths — except for "foot baths and butt baths."

When they arrive to New Orleans, they meet up with the siblings' dad—along with the Wolff family's dog Lucky—waiting for them at the bus stop. They later arrive at Onita's (Donna Lynn Leavy) family's house, and everyone is overjoyed that they have reunited. Onita's family has been friendly with the boys, their father and late mother since the siblings' early childhood. The band members also interact with Onita's daughters, "Big Ella" (Saorise Scott) and "Little Grace" (Grace Cartwright), despite "Big Ella" being the younger sister and "Little Grace" being the eldest.

The next day, the flooding from Hurricane Katrina flew Onita's house away, and because of this, the family had to move into a trailer home. Over dinner that night, to be well-mannered, Qaasim puts his napkin on Little Grace's lap. Little Grace did not seem to show much interest in what he did for her, and so Rosalina, aged 14, explains to 11-year-old Qaasim that Little Grace obviously dislikes guys who are polite and to be more of a "bad boy". On the other hand, Nat begins questioning Little Grace as to whether Rosalina likes him more than just a friend. Little Grace explains that it seems like Rosalina actually has a crush on Qaasim because Rosalina was telling her how she was fascinated by his table manners. Nonetheless, Rosalina only made that remark to have Little Grace fall in love with Qaasim. Following Rosalina's advice, Qaasim sits down next to Little Grace and pinches her butt. Little Grace becomes furious and she ensues his actions by taking her bowl of spaghetti and pouring it over his head.

Thereafter, the entire group speaks at a press conference, to where Alex looks at a calendar placed on the wall. Alex says, "Look at the calendar. Our picture. It's bigger. We're bigger than Santa Claus." News reporters falsely claim that he said, "Santa is a big fat blubber belly." The journalists get mad and they subsequently chase the band to Onita's trailer where they hide from the reporters. The misinterpretation causes the band's state dinner party to be cancelled.

Later on, Alex and Big Ella show Nat the documentary cameras which reveals Rosalina actually being attracted to Nat instead of Qaasim. The footage depicts Qaasim and Rosalina talking that night at dinner, and prior to when they were talking on the tour bus. They were discussing how they both agree that Nat is attracted to Little Grace. Then, while watching the tape, Nat starts shouting, "No! No! I'm in love with you, Rosalina. How could she not know that I love her?" Alex replies, "She does now." Instantly, Nat finds Rosalina smiling in the kitchen doorway. They begin to hug and kiss each other, to show their forgiveness.

The next morning, Big Ella wakes everyone up explaining that she provided evidence on a newscasting that the reporters made false accusations about Alex. Alex does not believe her and so she turns on the television to the media explaining: "Alex was framed by nasty reporters who just wanted a story." Big Ella, who is obsessed with Santa Clause, is shown on television explaining to reporters that "Alex loves Santa Clause. All Alex wanted to do was tell you that he was giving all his money to save the polar bears. The polar bears are Santa's neighbors. Santa loves them and he loves Alex too, and so do I." Everyone applauses the actions that Big Ella took to save Alex's reputation and the group's state dinner. That following night, the band raises money from that state dinner and donated it to a charity that helps global warming.

== Production ==
The siblings' mother Polly Draper, who is the series' creator and showrunner, wrote and directed this TV movie; she recalls, "Nat and Alex have become a fanatic about recycling and saving the environment. And mostly Alex, because after we watched An Inconvenient Truth, he completely flipped out about it. He refused to take baths: only foot and butt bath's—" Alex barges in by saying "Hey! That was written by her," pointing to his mother. Draper continues, "And we hope that this movie will get kids' to recycle and think about the polar bears and the environment."

Principal photography took place in New Orleans, Louisiana where the boys' father Michael Wolff is a native of. A scene in the film depicts Alex saying, "We're bigger than Santa Clause" which lampoons John Lennon's comment that The Beatles are "more popular than Jesus".

== Guest stars ==
Cast	Role
Matt Pinfield	self
George Lopez	self
Phil Collins	self

== Songs ==
Title	Episode no.	Written and Sung by	Keyboards by	Drums by
"I've Got A Question"	11/13	Nat Wolff	Nat Wolff	Alex Wolff
"Flying Away"	11	Nat Wolff	Nat Wolff	Alex Wolff
"I'll Do Anything"	12	Nat Wolff	Nat Wolff	Alex Wolff
"Why"	13	Alex Wolff	Alex Wolff, Nat Wolff	Alex Wolff
"Eventually"	13	Nat Wolff	Nat Wolff	Alex Wolff
