= Operation Mojo =

- The Naked Brothers Band episodes
- Episode nos.: Season 3 Episodes 3-4
- Directed by: Polly Draper
- Written by: Michael Rubiner &; Bob Mittenthal
- Cinematography by: Ken H. Keller
- Editing by: Tim Streeto
- Production code: 303-304/ 994
- Original air date: November 22, 2008

Episode chronology
← Previous "Mystery Girl"	Next → "Christmas Special"

"Operation Mojo" is the third and fourth episodes of the third season of the television series The Naked Brothers Band, which aired as a television movie on Nickelodeon on November 22, 2008 to 2.8 million viewers.

The TV movie episode follows the series' format as a rock-mockumentary. Operation Mojo is written by Michael Rubiner and Bob Mittenthal, and directed by Polly Draper, who is also the showrunner and mother to the show's stars Nat Wolff and Alex Wolff, the lead singer-songwriter and drummer, respectively.

== Plot ==
When Nat sees a tabloid photo of Rosalina kissing a young Frenchman during her "around the world cruise", he becomes convinced that he's losing her for good and goes into a funk that threatens to prevent him from finishing the movie the band is making.

Desperate to snap him out of his gloom, Alex leads Nat into the wilderness, believing that surviving the perils of nature will lead Nat to discover his inner strength and regain his mojo. But with so much at stake Alex knows that failure isn't an option, so he enlists the aid of his bandmates to clandestinely stage events designed to make Nat believe he's a wilderness hero.

When it seemed that the band is not helping, they made a plan with Qaasim's cousin to be saved from a bear and be kissed by Nat. The movie includes the debut of two brand-new songs, "I Feel Alone" and "Curious," both written and performed by Nat Wolff. At the end Rosalina comes back, explains her mistakes, and they kiss and hug.

== Songs Performed ==
Song	Lead Vocals and Lyrics	Drums
"Got No Mojo"	Nat Wolff	Alex Wolff
"I Feel Alone"	Nat Wolff	Alex Wolff
"Curious"	Nat Wolff	Alex Wolff
"Rosalina"	Nat Wolff	Alex Wolff
