= Melanie Mayron =

American actress and director (born 1952)

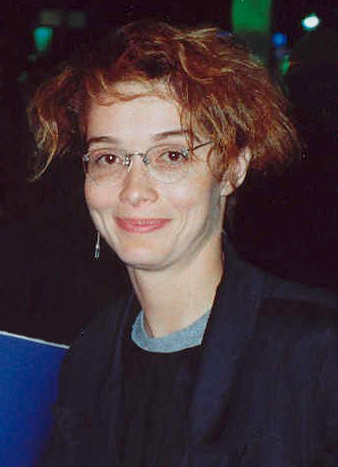
- Mayron in 1990
- Born: Melanie Joy Mayron; October 20, 1952 (age 74); Philadelphia, Pennsylvania, U.S.
- Education: American Academy of Dramatic Arts; Actors Studio
- Occupations: Actress; director
- Years active: 1974–present
- Children: 2

Melanie Joy Mayron (born October 20, 1952) is an American actress and director of film and television. Mayron is best known for her role as photographer Melissa Steadman on the ABC drama thirtysomething for which she won the Primetime Emmy Award for Outstanding Supporting Actress in a Drama Series in 1989, and was nominated for same award in 1990 and 1991. In 2018, the Santa Fe Film Festival honored Mayron for her outstanding contributions to film and television.

== Early life and career ==
Mayron was born in Philadelphia, Pennsylvania to Norma (née Goodman), a real estate agent, and David Mayron, a pharmaceutical chemist. Her family is Jewish; her father is from a Sephardic background (the original surname was "Mizrahi"), while her mother is of Russian Jewish descent. She graduated from the American Academy of Dramatic Arts in 1972 and subsequently attended the Actors Studio, studying initially with Lee Strasberg, and later with John Lehne and Sandra Seacat.

In her first starring role, Mayron appeared opposite Josh Mostel and Art Carney in the 1974 film Harry and Tonto. She worked steadily during the 1970s, with roles in the 1976 movies Gable and Lombard and Car Wash, and the 1977 films The Great Smokey Roadblock and You Light Up My Life, and starred in 1978's Girlfriends, directed by Claudia Weill. In the mid-1970s, she played Brenda Morgenstern's best friend, Sandy Franks, on three episodes of the Mary Tyler Moore Show spin-off, Rhoda. In 1982, she played Terry Simon, the photographer, in director Costa-Gavras' political drama Missing, alongside Jack Lemmon and Sissy Spacek.

In 1988, she co-wrote and co-produced the comedy film Sticky Fingers starring Helen Slater. In 1995, Mayron directed The Baby-Sitters Club, a film based upon the book series of the same name. She also directed the television movie Toothless (1997) starring Kirstie Alley and the movie Slap Her... She's French (2002), starring Piper Perabo (which appeared on television as She Gets What She Wants). In 2006, she appeared as a judge in the reality show Looking for Stars on the Starz! channel.

In addition to her role as Melissa Steadman, one of the primary cast members on thirtysomething, she directed episodes of the show as well. The character of Melissa, like Mayron, is single, hails from Philadelphia and has supported herself as a photographer.

The New York Times noted in a 1991 article about Mayron: "If most actresses make a point of distinguishing their real selves from the characters they play, Ms. Mayron is a curiosity in her insistence that, in fact, she is Melissa, or vice versa. Or maybe a more confident version of her television persona."

She directed episodes of numerous TV series, including In Treatment, The Fosters, Providence, Dawson's Creek, Ed, State of Grace, Nash Bridges, Wasteland, Tell Me You Love Me, Pretty Little Liars and The Naked Brothers Band; the latter series was created and showran by Mayron's former thirtysomething co-star Polly Draper. In 2015, she directed and released on YouTube The Living Room Sessions, a collection of videos of up-and-coming musical artists performing acoustic sets in her living room.

She's continued to direct TV, including episodes of the Netflix original series GLOW, SEAL Team, The Enemy Within, the 2018 Charmed reboot, Jane the Virgin, and Julia. In addition to directing Jane the Virgin, she also appears in a number of episodes as a feminist literature advisor. She and Gina Rodriguez first worked together when Rodriguez appeared in an episode of Army Wives that Mayron directed.

In December 2023, she appeared off Broadway in Sandra Tsing Loh's play, Madwomen of the West, alongside Caroline Aaron, Brooke Adams and Marilu Henner.

== Personal life ==
Mayron was in a long-term relationship with screenwriter and producer Cynthia Mort, with whom she shared co-parenting of their two children.

== Filmography ==
=== Director ===
Film

- The Baby-Sitters Club (1995)
- Slap Her... She's French (2002)
- Snapshots (2018)
- Brooklyn All American (2020)

TV movies

- Freaky Friday (1995)
- Toothless (1997)
- Zeyda and the Hitman (2004)
- Campus Confidential (2005)
- Mean Girls 2 (2011)

TV series

Year	Title	Notes
1998	The Larry Sanders Show	Episode: "Just the Perfect Blendship"
1998–02	Arliss	7 episodes
2001–02	State of Grace	5 episodes
2007–08	The Naked Brothers Band	10 episodes
2008	In Treatment	7 episodes
2012	Easy to Assemble	11 episodes
2012–16	Pretty Little Liars	7 episodes
2013–15	Switched at Birth	7 episodes
2015–19	Jane the Virgin	17 episodes
2018–21	Dynasty	6 episodes
2019	BH90210	Episode: "The Table Read"
2020	Lincoln Rhyme: Hunt for the Bone Collector	Episode: "God Complex"
2020	Diary of a Future President	Episode: "State of the Union"
2020	Tommy	Episode: "The Swatting Game"
2020	The Baker & The Beauty	Episode: "May I Have This Dance?"
2021	Why Women Kill	Episode: "The Unguarded Moment"
2022	A Million Little Things	Episode: "Piece of Cake"
2022	Julia	2 episodes
2023–24	Not Dead Yet	2 episodes
2025	The Hunting Wives	2 episodes

=== Actress ===
Film

Year	Title	Role	Notes
1974	Harry and Tonto	Ginger	
1976	Gable and Lombard	Dixie	
1976	Car Wash	Marsha	
1977	The Great Smokey Roadblock	Lula	
1977	You Light Up My Life	Annie Gerrard	
1978	Girlfriends	Susan Weinblatt	
1981	Heartbeeps	Susan	
1982	Missing	Terry Simon	
1986	The Boss' Wife	Janet Keefer	
1988	Sticky Fingers	Lolly	Also co-wrote and produced
1989	Checking Out	Jenny Macklin	
1990	My Blue Heaven	Crystal Rybak	
1994	Drop Zone	Mrs. Willins	
2007	Itty Bitty Titty Committee	Courtney Cadmar	
2012	Breaking the Girls	Annie	

TV movies

Year	Title	Role
1975	Hustling	Dee Dee
1978	Katie: Portrait of a Centerfold	Madelaine
1980	Playing for Time	Marianne
1981	Lily: Sold Out	Harriet Van Dam
1981	The Best Little Girl in the World	Carol Link
1983	Will There Really Be a Morning?	Sophie
1985	Wallenberg: A Hero's Story	Sonja Kahn
1993	Ordeal in the Arctic	Sue Hillier
1993	Other Women's Children	Dr. Amelia Stewart
1997	Toothless	Mindy
2000	Range of Motion	Alice Taylor

TV series

Year	Title	Role	Episode(s)
1975	Medical Center	Jan Simmons	"Two Against Death"
1975–76	Rhoda	Sandy Franks	"With Friends Like These"
1975–76	Rhoda	Sandy Franks	"If You Don't Tell Her, I Will"
1975–76	Rhoda	Sandy Franks	"A Federal Case"
1977	The Love Boat	Joyce Adams	"The New Love Boat"
1984	Finder of Lost Loves	Michelle Peters	"Undying Love"
1985	Cagney & Lacey	Paula Eastman	"Con Games"
1985–86	ABC Afterschool Special	Janet Eller / Sue	"Cindy Eller: A Modern Fairy Tale"
1985–86	ABC Afterschool Special	Janet Eller / Sue	"Wanted: The Perfect Guy"
1987–91	Thirtysomething	Melissa Steadman	
1988	The Twilight Zone	Louise Simonson	"Acts of Terror"
1993	Tribeca	Maggie	"Stepping Back"
1994	Lois & Clark: The New Adventures of Superman	Detective Betty Reed	"The Ides of Metropolis"
1997	Mad About You	Dorie	"Astrology"
1998	Something So Right	Rachel Travers	"Something About Burning Meat, Bridges and Rugs"
2006	Criminal Minds	Becka Doyle	"Somebody's Watching"
2008	Lipstick Jungle	Patty Bloom	"Nothing Sacred"
2008	Lipstick Jungle	Patty Bloom	"Pink Poison"
2012	Pretty Little Liars	Laurel Tuchman	"That Girl Is Poison"
2016–19	Jane the Virgin	Marlene Donaldson	

== Awards and nominations ==
Year	Award	Category	Nominated work	Result	Ref.
1978	British Academy Film Awards	Most Promising Newcomer to Leading Film Roles	Girlfriends	Nominated	
1997	Directors Guild of America Awards	Outstanding Directorial Achievement in Children's Programs	Toothless (for The Wonderful World of Disney)	Nominated	
1978	Locarno International Film Festival	Bronze Leopard	Girlfriends	Won	
1989	Primetime Emmy Awards	Outstanding Supporting Actress in a Drama Series	thirtysomething	Won	
1990	Primetime Emmy Awards	Outstanding Supporting Actress in a Drama Series	thirtysomething	Nominated	
1991	Primetime Emmy Awards	Outstanding Supporting Actress in a Drama Series	thirtysomething	Nominated	
1991	Viewers for Quality Television Awards	Best Supporting Actress in a Quality Drama Series	thirtysomething	Nominated	
2013	Women's Image Network Awards	TV show Directed by a Woman	Army Wives	Won	

== See also ==
- List of female film and television directors
- List of lesbian filmmakers
- List of LGBT-related films directed by women
