= Nielsen VideoScan =

American home video marketing research company

- Industry: Video marketing research
- Founder: ACNielsen; VNU's VideoScan
- Area served: Canada; United States
- Parent: The Nielsen Company
- Website: web.archive.org/web/20080909112837/http://www.videoscan.com/

Nielsen VideoScan is a home video marketing research company formed as a partnership formed between Verenigde Nederlandse Uitgeverijen's (VNU) VideoScan and ACNielsen. Both companies are now owned by The Nielsen Company. Nielsen VideoScan provides detailed point-of-sale data regarding sales of VHS videotape cassettes, DVDs, HD DVDs, and Blu-ray Discs. The data is collected from VHS and DVD distribution outlets, such as retail stores, in the United States and Canada and then made available to clients in customized report form through the VideoScan website.

Clients may purchase data either through on-going subscriptions, or on an ad hoc basis. Additionally, Nielsen VideoScan frequently provides sales rankings of video titles (although not specific sales numbers) to entertainment and mainstream news media.

A similar service for music CD and cassette sales data is provided by Nielsen SoundScan.
