= The Naked Brothers Band: The Movie =

2005 film by Polly Draper

- DVD release cover. From top left to bottom: Alex Wolff; Cooper Pillot; Allie DiMeco; Nat Wolff. Center: Alex Wolff (drumsticks) and Nat Wolff (microphone). Bottom right: Allie DiMeco.
- Directed by: Polly Draper
- Written by: Polly Draper
- Produced by: Polly Draper; Michael Wolff; Ken H. Keller; Caron Rudner; Jonathan Pillot
- Starring: Nat Wolff; Alex Wolff; Joshua Kaye; David Levi; Thomas Batuello; Cole Hawkins; Allie DiMeco; Jesse Draper; Michael Wolff; Cooper Pillot
- Cinematography: Ken H. Keller
- Edited by: Craig Cobb
- Music by: Nat Wolff; Alex Wolff
- Distributed by: Paramount Home Entertainment; Nickelodeon; Worldwide Biggies
- Release dates: October 23, 2005 (Hamptons); January 27, 2007 (United States)
- Running time: 84 minutes 82 minutes (DVD)
- Country: United States
- Language: English
- Budget: <$1 million

The Naked Brothers Band: The Movie is a 2005 American musical comedy film written and directed by Polly Draper, which stars her sons, Nat Wolff and Alex Wolff, who portray members of a fictional rock group. It tells of the boys' struggles with their fame and an internal dispute that causes the band to split before reuniting in the end. The film is emboldened by Nat's band, The Silver Boulders, which he created in preschool with his friends Joshua Kaye, Thomas Batuello, and David Levi, who all act as themselves. It also includes Allie DiMeco as Nat's faux female interest, the siblings' real-life cousin Jesse Draper as the group's babysitter, Draper's husband Michael Wolff playing his sons' widowed accordion-playing dad, and real life friends Cooper Pillot and Cole Hawkins portraying the other members of the band.

Draper shot the film in the style of a mockumentary—a parody in documentary format—that depicts the daily activities of the characters. Nat composed and performed the music, yet one song had been written by Alex. Principal photography took place in mid-2004 on location in New York City, and the interior scenes were vastly filmed in the family's Manhattan apartment. Draper's brother, Tim, a venture capitalist, provided financial incentives for the shoot.

In late 2005, Polly Draper, known for her role in Thirtysomething, and her jazz musician husband Michael Wolff entered the film at the Hamptons International Film Festival, where it won the audience award. Former Nickelodeon Entertainment president Albie Hecht attended the screening and purchased the movie, in association with his Worldwide Biggies label. It became the pilot for the subsequent Nickelodeon show of the same name, airing in the United States on January 27, 2007. The series was created and showran by Draper, which premiered in February 2007, to the channel's highest ratings in seven years for viewers in the 6–11 age group.

== Plot ==
The film begins with an introduction to the documentary from the boys. Nat and Alex Wolff, aged nine and six, respectively, are members of the fictional band The Silver Boulders, which also consists of Thomas, David, Josh, and their manager Cooper. The band found success after a music executive signed them to his label, Who's the Man Records. The band performs their new song "Motormouth" at a concert in the Hammerstein Ballroom. After the show, the band members describe how their group started and a clip from their music video "Crazy Car" is shown.

The bandmates get along well until Thomas composes the song "Boys Rule, Girls Drool", which Nat dislikes. Nat writes a song called "Rosalina" that is about Josh's elder half-sister. Thomas and Josh ridicule Nat because the song shows his feelings for her. Moreover, Josh composes another song that Nat also dislikes, titled "I'm the God of Rock and Roll", set to the tune of "Twinkle, Twinkle, Little Star". The band has a food fight in a restaurant, prompting Thomas, David, and Josh to leave and form a new group, The Gold Boulders, managed by the scornful Mort Needleman.

After watching media reports of the band's split on television, Nat and Alex go into a state of depression. Alex begins to binge on lemon-lime soda and falls asleep, while he lies curled in the midst of aluminum cans. Nat simultaneously writes a song by the piano titled "If There Was a Place to Hide" as the band's fans gather outside his apartment, pleading for them to reunite. Despite the absence of the formers, Alex persuades a reluctant Nat to revive the band, and subsequently, they change the band's title to its original, The Naked Brothers Band. Through a line-up of auditions, Nat, Alex, and Cooper select Rosalina as their cellist and Cole Hawkins—a member of the original Naked Brothers Band—as the guitarist.

The newly established band embark on a tour to Chicago, though Nat discovers that The Gold Boulders is their opening act. The Gold Boulders start the show with "Boys Rule, Girls Drool" and are immediately booed off the stage. After their performance, The Naked Brothers Band perform "Hardcore Wrestlers (with Inner Feelings)" and "Rosalina", which are greeted with a loud applause from the audience. After the concert, Nat hosts a party for the band in his apartment. In the midst of the party, David, Thomas, and Josh arrive at his front door, asking to join the reconstructed band. Forgivingly, a surprised Nat welcomes them to join the celebration. The film concludes with the outfit performing "Crazy Car" on the roof of the Wolffs' apartment while fireworks detonate in the background.

== Characters ==
Adults over the age of 18 can be nonsensical, and therefore, the children are responsible for undertaking challenging circumstances. Nat is the lead singer-songwriter and keyboardist, while his younger brother Alex is the flamboyant drummer. Alex invented a distinctive outfit: a red, white, and blue do-rag with socks tied around his ankles. He has a crush on the band's nanny and tutor, the 19-year-old Jesse Cook (Jesse Draper). Nat is called "The Girl Magnet" and tends to speak with an English accent in front of 11-year-old Rosalina (Allie DiMeco). The group also features Nat's preschool friends – David (David Levi) as the keyboardist, Thomas (Thomas Batuello) as the cellist, Josh (Joshua Kaye) as the guitarist – and Cooper (Cooper Pillot) is the band's manager. The brothers' father (Michael Wolff) is an inept accordionist.

Principal Schmoke (Tim Draper) leads Amigo Elementary School. The Timmerman Brothers is a band consisting of brothers Donnie (Adam Draper), Johnny (Coulter Mulligan), and Billy (Billy Draper). They had a hit single titled "Splishy Splashy Soap Bubble", but their careers ended when their voices changed during puberty. Music critic (Barbara eda-Young) describes The Silver Boulders' music as "nostalgic". The romantic couple (James Badge-Dale and Gretchen Egolf) recall the group performing "Crazy Car" at their wedding ceremony.

== Production ==
=== Development ===
Through their father, Nat and Alex were exposed to music from birth. As a four-year-old, Nat showed musical gifts that astounded his father. He easily taught himself piano chords, which he called "'my proud chords'". At the age of five, he began to compose songs after listening to music by The Beatles, and Alex began playing the saxophone when he was two. Nat and his brother once said, "We're the naked brothers band!" after having a bath that inspired the name of the movie. While in pre-school, Nat and his friends formed a band called The Silver Boulders. Later on, Alex joined as the drummer, which he learned on his own by watching footage of Ringo Starr.

Draper did not want her children to be actors; she explained, "Nat kept putting signs on his door: 'I want to be a child actor!' I said, 'No, it's too brutal.'" However, Nat shot a home-video called Don't Eat Off My Plate, which Draper presented in documentary style by interviewing his friends. This served as the basis for The Naked Brothers Band: The Movie, depicting the boys as music icons akin to The Beatles. In a TV Guide interview in early 2007, Draper explained, "What originally happened was that Nat and Alex had a band, and the idea evolved based on that. Spinal Tap meets The Little Rascals was my concept ... I wanted to have that Help! or A Hard Day's Night kind of feeling."

=== Filming ===
The film was originally intended as an extended family project, and was shot over five weeks in mid-2004 for less than US$1 million. Filming took place on location in New York City — where, according to Draper, the crew "would sneak into locations and run" — and at the Draper-Wolff family apartment in Manhattan. Draper wrote and directed the film, which was produced by Ken H. Keller, Caron Rudner, Jonathan Pillot, Michael Wolff and Draper herself. The film was co-produced by Fotene Trigonis and edited by Craig Cobb, who also served as the associate producer. The executive producers were Draper, Wolff, and Draper's brother, Tim, who oversaw the budget. Keller used a color framing, high-definition video camera. Rudner served as the line producer, while John M. Davis was the music editor. Rick Butler served as the production designer, Frederick Howard was the supervising sound editor, and Deb Temco oversaw the casting. Moreover, David Levi's father, Robert, provided footage of the real-life preschool band's daily antics; they sang and played instruments in the Wolffs' apartment, and Nat wrote the music.

When Polly Draper told her friend Julianne Moore and her husband, writer and director Bart Freundlich, about the film, Freundlich responded, "Julia would love to be in your movie." Moore changed her schedule at late notice to participate in filming, and Draper wrote Moore's scene as it was being filmed; Draper quickly created a set that depicted the backstage green room of the talk show, Late Night with Conan O'Brien. Moore and Nat filmed the scene in one take, and Draper was impressed with her son's performance, while saying that Moore's presence added credibility to the project.

=== Casting ===
"We've always performed for each other at family reunions, and we're constantly singing songs at Christmas, goofy songs we've made up, or we'll put on little family plays or make family movies. So when [Aunt] Polly said, 'Let’s make a family movie,' we didn't realize it was like, a real movie."

— Jesse Draper

Most of the cast were friends or relatives of the Draper-Wolff clan. Tim Draper is Polly's brother and John B. Williams is the cellist for Michael Wolff's band Impure Thoughts. Barbara eda-Young, James Badge-Dale, Gretchen Egolf, and Cooper Pillot had previously performed with Draper in her play Getting Into Heaven in 2003. Jesse Draper is Tim's daughter and thus Polly's niece, and Nat and Alex's cousin. Billy and Adam Draper are Tim's sons, and Coulter Mulligan is Jesse's cousin and Polly's nephew.

Many of Wolff and Draper's show business friends appeared in the film. Wolff had been the music director for jazz singer Nancy Wilson and she introduced him to Arsenio Hall, who later chose Wolff as the bandleader of his talk show. Tony Shalhoub portrayed Phil in Draper's screenwriting debut The Tic Code, which was emboldened by Wolff's difficulties with Tourette syndrome as well as his exploits as a jazz pianist. Draper guest starred in the first season of Shalhoub's hit sitcom Monk. Other guest stars in the movie include Cyndi Lauper, her husband David Thornton, Brent Popolizio, Cindy Blackman, and Ricki Lake. In addition, Draper had also made a cameo alongside her Thirtysomething co-stars Timothy Busfield, Mel Harris, Peter Horton, Melanie Mayron, Ken Olin, and Patricia Wettig.

David Levi, Thomas Batuello, and Joshua Kaye were preschool friends of Nat. Moore's son, Cal, has been a classmate of Alex since preschool, while Uma Thurman's daughter Maya was also a preschool friend of Alex. Ann Curry's son Walker, an original member of The Silver Boulders, was Nat's friend in preschool. Cole Hawkins, an actor who also starred as Leonard in the 2003 musical comedy film School of Rock, had no previous involvement with the band. Neither did Allie DiMeco; she auditioned for her role.

=== Music ===
Nat wrote most of the songs performed in the film. As a six-year-old, he composed a melody without lyrics, which he later used as the basis for the bubblegum pop piece "Crazy Car". The song was meant to emulate the music of The Beach Boys. "Firefighters", a song written by Nat for a local 9/11 fundraiser when he was aged 7, was later retitled to "Rosalina" for the movie. Nat wrote "Motormouth" while he was angry at Alex. Another song, "That's How It Is", was written by Alex after an unsuccessful dating attempt with a teenager ten years his senior. Additional songs Nat performed in the film include "Got No Mojo", "Hardcore Wrestlers (with Inner Feelings)", "I Need You (Sorry Girl)", and "If There Was a Place to Hide".

Michael Wolff contributed the underscore and produced the music with Michael A. Levine. In the film, Wolff performed the songs "Rathskeller Polka", "Rathskeller Waltz", "Naked Party Polka", and "Naked Tango". He played the underscore for "Shakey Shakey" (lyrics by Alex), and "Boys Rule, Girls Drool" and "Splishy Splashy (Timmerman Song)", both written by Draper. The elder Wolff was once the musical director for jazz artist Nancy Wilson; in the movie, Wilson sang a rendition of the song "Crazy Car".

== Releases and debuts ==
=== Television spin-off ===
"They're just real: real brothers, real friends; it's all the stuff kids do when they're hanging out on the playground. The idea that you're watching a documentary is so much fun. Then you put them into that fantasy of being a world-famous rock band, and that's the sauce that makes it work."

— Albie Hecht

According to Michael Wolff, the family made the film without expecting a television series spin-off. Their agent believed the film would be lucrative and market research showed a positive reaction with a young audience. After the film was shown at the Hamptons International Film Festival, Nickelodeon bought it. Moreover, "Albie Hecht had an independent production deal with Nickelodeon" and believed the film suited the network and that a television show was feasible. Draper and Wolff did not want their children in show business at such a young age but agreed when Hecht's agent promised to work within the boy's schedule, so that they would not miss school. This meant a summer shooting schedule in New York and short, 13-episode seasons. Nonetheless, after three seasons, despite the show's high ratings, network executives urged the family to lengthen the 13 episode season to 30 TV movies. Draper and Wolff refused, and as a result, the show was cancelled.

Tom Ashiem, the executive vice president and general manager of Nickelodeon explained, "At first, we were intrigued by the idea, but we weren't sure kids would get the vague tongue-and-cheek-of-it. Then a bunch of us took it home to our own children and they loved it." The Naked Brothers Band television series ran from 2007 to 2009. Draper was the creator, head writer, executive producer, and director, while Hecht was the other executive producer and his production company Worldwide Biggies distributed the series. Later, made-for-TV movies were created and aired as the series continued—a total of eight have been screened on Nickelodeon. The latter films often consisted of an extended, two-part episode—Nickelodeon usually uses the "movie" definition for these hour-long episodes—and were usually broadcast as part of a holiday event or on weekends.

=== International debuts ===
The film aired worldwide, debuting in Canada on September 10, 2007 on YTV and in Germany on October 20, 2007. The film received a Region 1 DVD release on April 3, 2007 through Nickelodeon and Paramount Home Entertainment.

== Reception ==
"Like Roberto Rodriguez [sic], who fashioned his The Adventures of Sharkboy and Lavagirl in 3-D screenplay from his offspring's story, Draper has modeled her scenario on her sons' actual behavior and musical compositions, set within the clichéd rise-and-fall structures of VH-1's 'Behind the Music' bios."

— Ronnie Scheib

The film won the audience award for a family feature film at the Hamptons International Film Festival in 2005. It also received a nomination at the Young Artist Awards in 2008 for Best Television Movie or Special. When it premiered on Nickelodeon in January 2007, it was seen by an average of 2.7 million viewers. The movie was also broadcast four times, producing a total viewership of 14 million; it was placed on the top 10 spot of Nielsen VideoScan children's non-theatrical DVD charts. The song "Crazy Car" was downloaded more than 100,000 times on iTunes; and it peaked at number eighty-three on the Billboard Hot 100 for one week and the track was featured on the Nickelodeon's Kids' Choice, Vol 3.

Ronnie Sheib, of Variety, wrote: "Convincingly faithful to kids' rhythms and speech patterns, and featuring several catchy if one-chorus numbers, this bouncy, feel-good kidpic, with targeted release strategy, could rock peers and parents alike." Felicia R. Lee from The New York Times called the film "an ebullient mock documentary".
