= Allie DiMeco =

American actress, reality television personality, and multi-instrumentalist

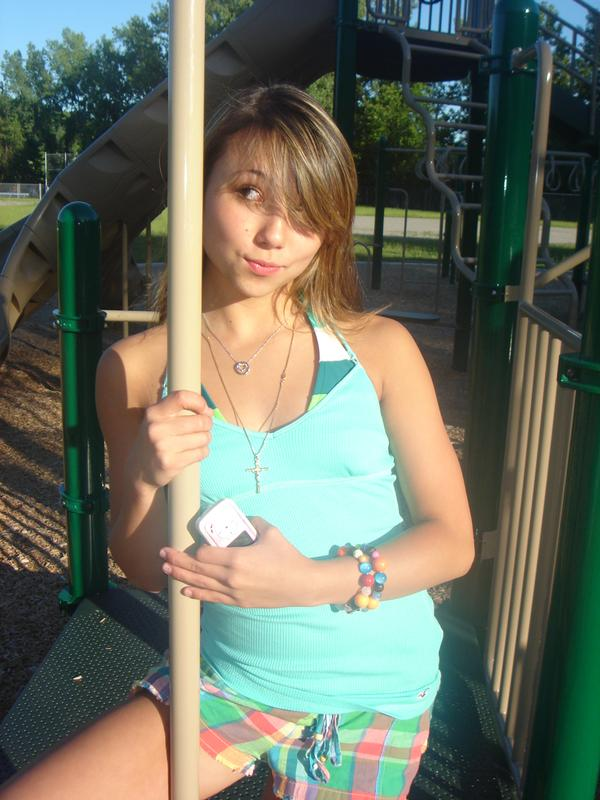
- DiMeco in 2007
- Born: Alexandra Jean Theresa DiMeco; June 12, 1992 (age 34); Waterbury, Connecticut, U.S.
- Education: Florida International University (BA, MA)
- Occupations: Actress; multi-instrumentalist; model
- Years active: 2003–2009, 2019–present

Alexandra Jean Theresa "Allie" DiMeco (born June 12, 1992) is an American actress, reality television personality, multi-instrumentalist, and model, primarily known for playing the role of Nat Wolff's main love interest Rosalina in the Nickelodeon musical comedy series The Naked Brothers Band.

== Career ==
DiMeco started acting and modeling at the age of five. DiMeco played piano, bass guitar and cello in the Nickelodeon series The Naked Brothers Band. She also starred in The Naked Brothers Band: The Movie.

Other acting credits include the Late Show with David Letterman, One Life to Live, Saturday Night Live, The King and I (National Tour) as Princess Ying Yawolak. She was nominated for a Young Artist Award for 2008 for her work in The Naked Brothers Band ensemble cast.

She attended Florida International University where she obtained her Bachelor of Arts in communication, journalism, and related programs in 2014 and her Master of Arts in mass communication and media studies in 2018.

== Filmography ==
Year	Title	Role	Notes
2005	The Naked Brothers Band: The Movie	Rosalina	
2007–2009	The Naked Brothers Band	Rosalina	Main role
2019	Temptation Island	Herself	Season 4
2019–2020	Ex on the Beach: Peak of Love	Herself	Main cast
