= Jesse Draper =

American venture capitalist and TV host

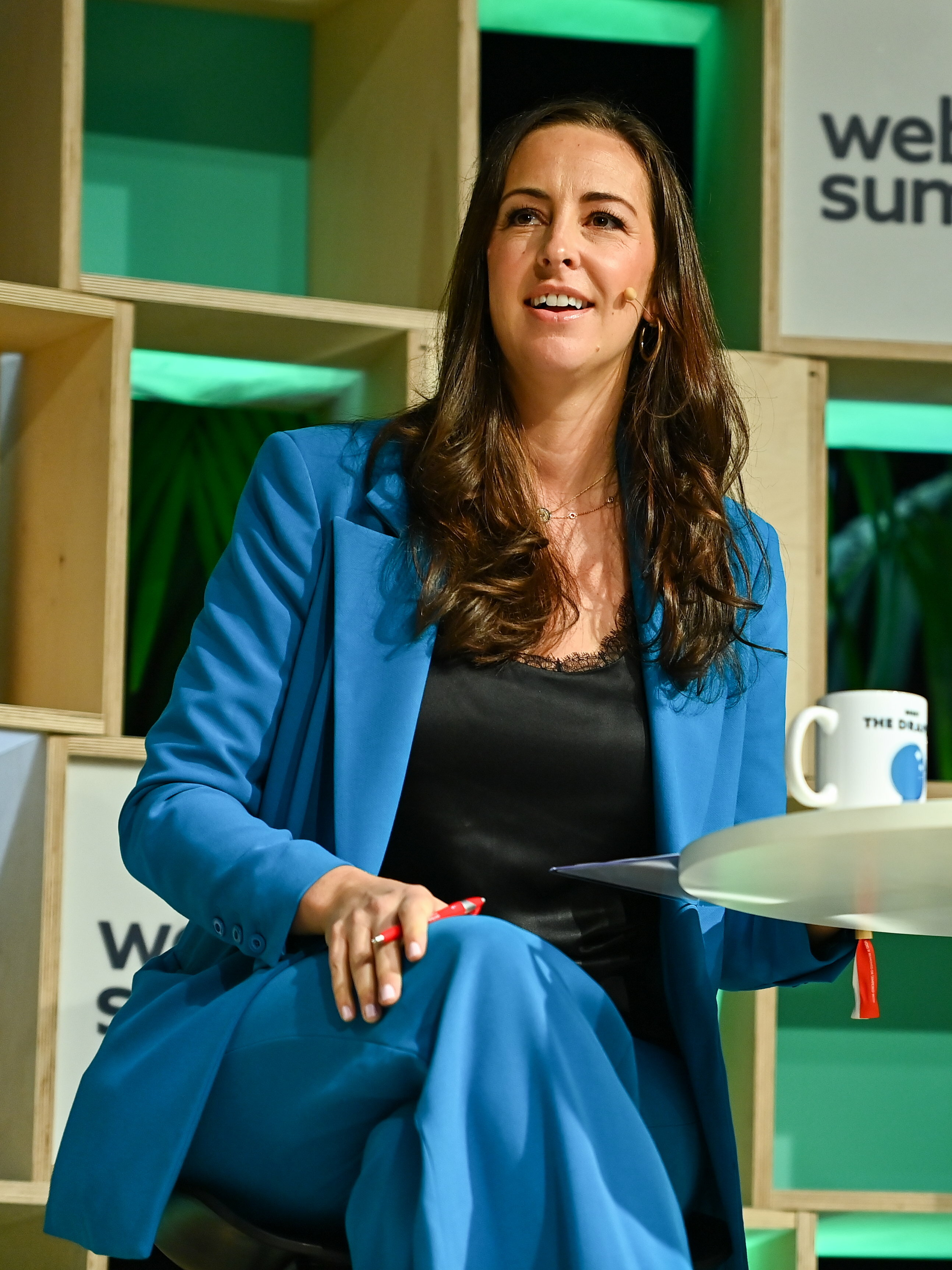
- Draper in 2022
- Born: 1983 or 1984 (age 42–43)
- Occupations: Venture capitalist, TV personality
- Years active: 1993–present
- Employer: Halogen Ventures
- Notable work: The Naked Brothers Band, The Valley Girl Show
- Spouse: Brian MacInnes (m. 2013)
- Children: 3
- Father: Tim Draper
- Relatives: William Henry Draper Jr. (great-grandfather); William Henry Draper III (grandfather); Polly Draper (aunt); Michael Wolff (uncle); Alex Wolff (cousin); Nat Wolff (cousin)
- Website: halogenvc.com

Jesse Draper (born c. 1983 or 1984) is an American venture capitalist and TV personality.

== Early life ==
Jesse Draper is the daughter of Silicon Valley venture capitalist Timothy C. Draper and Melissa Lee (née Parker) Draper. Her paternal grandfather is William Henry Draper III, former chairman of the Export–Import Bank of the United States and her great-grandfather was banker, general, and diplomat William Henry Draper Jr. who served as the first U.S. Ambassador to NATO.

In 2006, Draper graduated from the University of California, Los Angeles (UCLA) with a Bachelor of Arts (BA) degree in theater.

== Career ==
Draper began her career as an actress. Her first notable role was on the Nickelodeon series The Naked Brothers Band, which starred her cousins Nat Wolff and Alex Wolff and was created by her aunt Polly Draper.

She created a technology talk web show called The Valley Girl Show which she hosted, wrote, and produced with Jonathan Polenz. In May 2014, Draper signed a distribution deal with Cox Media Group to broadcast the talk show in Northern California and Seattle.

=== Venture capitalist ===
In 2015, Draper founded Halogen Ventures to invest in female-founded companies. She has invested in 70 companies and had 10 exits.

== Personal life ==
On June 15, 2013, Draper married accountant Brian MacInnes. They have three sons.

== Filmography ==
| Year | Film | Role | Notes |
|---|---|---|---|
| 1993 | Broken Promises: Taking Emily Back | Homeless Girl | Uncredited |
| 2006 | The Naked Brothers Band: The Movie | Jesse Cook | |
| 2006 | American Dreams | Bandstand Girl | 1 episode |
| 2007–09 | The Naked Brothers Band | Jesse Cook | 40 episodes |
| 2009 | Ticket Out | Bank Teller | |
| 2010 | The Mighty Macs | Mrs. Ballard | |
| 2012 | It's a Disaster | Woman with dog | |
