= Katie Holmes =

American actress (born 1978)

- Holmes in 2026
- Born: Kate Noelle Holmes (Note: Several sources state "Katherine", though "Kate" is Holmes's legal name.); December 18, 1978 (age 47); Toledo, Ohio, U.S.
- Occupations: Actress; director; producer
- Years active: 1997–present
- Spouse: Tom Cruise (m. 2006; div. 2012)
- Children: 1

Kate Noelle Holmes (born December 18, 1978) is an American actress. She first achieved fame as Joey Potter on the television series Dawson's Creek (1998–2003).

Holmes made her film debut with a supporting role in Ang Lee's The Ice Storm (1997). A mixture of parts in big-budget and small-scale film projects came next, including Disturbing Behavior (1998), Go, Teaching Mrs. Tingle (both 1999), Wonder Boys, The Gift (both 2000), Abandon, Phone Booth (both 2002), The Singing Detective, Pieces of April (both 2003), First Daughter (2004), Batman Begins, Thank You for Smoking (both 2005), Mad Money (2008), Don't Be Afraid of the Dark (2010), Jack and Jill (2011), Miss Meadows (2014), Woman in Gold, Touched with Fire (both 2015), Logan Lucky (2017), Dear Dictator (2018), Coda (2019), Brahms: The Boy II, and The Secret: Dare to Dream (both 2020).

Outside of film, Holmes made her Broadway theatre debut in a 2008 production of Arthur Miller's All My Sons. In 2011, she portrayed Jacqueline Kennedy in the television miniseries The Kennedys, a role she reprised in The Kennedys: After Camelot (2017). She also played the part of Paige Finney on the third season of Showtime's Ray Donovan in 2015. Holmes made her directorial debut with the 2016 film All We Had, in which she also starred, following in 2022, by her second film Alone Together, which was also her debut as a screenwriter.

Holmes's marriage to actor Tom Cruise, which lasted from 2006 to 2012, attracted a great deal of media attention. They have one child together, a daughter.

== Early life ==
Holmes was born in Toledo, Ohio. She is the youngest of five children born to Kathleen (née Stothers), a homemaker and philanthropist, and Martin Joseph Holmes Sr., an attorney who played basketball at Marquette University under coach Al McGuire. She has three sisters and one brother. Holmes was baptized a Catholic and attended Christ the King Church in Toledo.

She graduated from the all-female Notre Dame Academy in Toledo (also her mother's alma mater), where she was a 4.0 student. At St. John's Jesuit, a nearby all-male high school, Holmes appeared in school musicals, playing a waitress in Hello, Dolly! and Lola in Damn Yankees. She scored 1310 out of 1600 on her SAT and was accepted to Columbia University (and attended for a summer session); her father wanted her to become a doctor.

At age 14, she began classes at a modeling school in Toledo which led her to the International Modeling and Talent Association (IMTA) Competition held in New York City in 1996. Eventually, Holmes was signed to an agent after performing a monologue from To Kill a Mockingbird. An audition tape was sent to the casting director for the 1997 film The Ice Storm, directed by Ang Lee, and Holmes made her big-screen debut in the role of Libbets Casey in the film, opposite Kevin Kline and Sigourney Weaver.

== Career ==
=== 1997–2003: Dawson's Creek and career development ===
In January 1997, Holmes went to Los Angeles for pilot season, when producers and cast shoot new programs in the hopes of securing a spot on a network schedule. The Toledo Blade reported she was offered the lead in Buffy the Vampire Slayer but she turned it down in order to finish high school. Columbia TriStar Television, producer of a new show named Dawson's Creek that was created by screenwriter Kevin Williamson, asked her to come to Los Angeles to audition, but there was a conflict with her schedule. "I was doing my school play, Damn Yankees. And I was playing Lola. I even got to wear the feather boa. I thought, 'There is no way I'm not playing Lola to go audition for some network. I couldn't let my school down. We had already sold a lot of tickets. So I told Kevin and The WB, 'I'm sorry. I just can't meet with you this week. I've got other commitments.' " The producers permitted her to audition on videotape. Holmes read for the part of Joey Potter, the tomboy best friend of the title character Dawson, on a videotape shot in her basement, her mother reading Dawson's lines.

The Hollywood Reporter claimed the story of Holmes's audition "has become the stuff of legend" and "no one even thought that it was weird that one of the female leads would audition via Federal Express." Holmes won the part. Paul Stupin, executive producer of the show, said his first reaction on seeing her audition tape was "That's Joey Potter!" Creator and executive producer Kevin Williamson said Holmes has a "unique combination of talent, beauty and skill that makes Hollywood come calling. But that's just the beginning. To meet her is to instantly fall under her spell." Williamson thought she had exactly the right look for Joey Potter. "She had those eyes, those eyes just stained with loneliness." While Dawson's Creek was met with mixed reviews, Holmes attained national attention. Holmes was soon on the covers of magazines such as Seventeen, TV Guide, and Rolling Stone. Jancee Dunn, an editor at Rolling Stone, said she was chosen for the cover because "every time you mention Dawson's Creek you tend to get a lot of dolphin-like shrieks from teenage girls. The fact that she is drop-dead gorgeous didn't hurt either."

During her time as a series regular on Dawson's Creek, Holmes's first leading role in a film came in 1998's Disturbing Behavior, a Scream-era Stepford Wives-goes-to-high school thriller, where she was a loner from the wrong side of the tracks. The film was recut from what the director intended. Roger Ebert, then of the Chicago Sun-Times wrote of her character, Rachel, "dresses in black and likes to strike poses on the beds of pickup trucks and is a bad girl who is in great danger of becoming a very good one." Despite the fact that it received mixed reviews and was not a huge financial success, the actress won a MTV Movie Award for Best Breakthrough Performance for the role and also received a Saturn Award nomination for the part. Holmes, though, said the film was "just horrible." In 1999, she played a disaffected supermarket clerk in Doug Liman's ensemble piece Go. The film received excellent reviews and made a profit, and Holmes herself was liked by critics. The same year, in Kevin Williamson's Teaching Mrs. Tingle, which he wrote and directed, Holmes played a straight-A student whose vindictive teacher (Helen Mirren) threatens to keep her from a desperately needed scholarship. Also in 1999, she had an uncredited cameo with Dawson's Creek co-star Joshua Jackson in Muppets from Space, which was filmed in Wilmington, North Carolina where Dawson's Creek also filmed.

The year 2000 saw Holmes feature in two film roles. The first was in Wonder Boys, directed by Curtis Hanson from the novel by Michael Chabon. The film told the story of a creative writing teacher at a university, with Michael Douglas in the leading role. Holmes had a small role (six and a half minutes of screen time) as Hannah Green, the talented student who lusts after Professor Grady Tripp (Douglas's character, who is her instructor and landlord). Many leading critics at the time took favorable notice to Holmes in the film. Kenneth Turan of the Los Angeles Times said she was "just right as the beauty with kind of a crush on the old man." Her second feature film during 2000 was The Gift, a Southern Gothic story directed by Sam Raimi and starring Cate Blanchett, she played the antithesis of Joey Potter: a promiscuous rich girl having affairs with everyone from a sociopathic wife-beater (Keanu Reeves) to the district attorney (Gary Cole), and is murdered by her fiancé (Greg Kinnear). Holmes did her first nude scene for the film, in a scene where her character was about to be murdered. Her appearance was lamented by Variety's Steven Kotler. In Ohio, the scene met with disapproval from Russ Lemmon writing in the Toledo Blade.

Holmes hosted Saturday Night Live on February 24, 2001, participating in a send-up of Dawson's Creek where she falls madly in love with Chris Kattan's Mr. Peepers character and singing "Big Spender" from Sweet Charity. In the 2002 film Abandon, written by Oscar winner Stephen Gaghan, Holmes plays a delusional, homicidal college student named "Katie". Todd McCarthy of Variety and Roger Ebert commended her performance, but other critics savaged it. During the final season of Dawson's Creek, Holmes played the mistress of the public relations flack played by Colin Farrell in Phone Booth, which was both critically and financially successful. She also appeared as Robert Downey, Jr.'s nurse in The Singing Detective (2003). Dawson's Creek ended its run in 2003, and Holmes was the only actor to appear in all 128 episodes. "It was very difficult for me to leave Wilmington, to have my little glass bubble burst and move on. I hate change. On the other hand it was refreshing to play someone else", she said in 2004.

=== 2003–2009: Focus on film career, brief hiatus, and theatre work ===
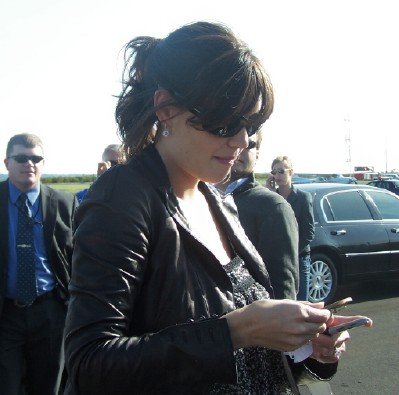
Holmes in May 2006

Holmes's first starring role post-Dawson's Creek was in 2003's Pieces of April, a gritty comedy about a dysfunctional family on Thanksgiving. Many critics and audiences agreed that Holmes had given her best performance in the film as April. Variety said it was "one of her best film performances." "Each actor shines", wrote Elvis Mitchell, "even Ms. Holmes, whose beauty seems to have fogged the minds of her previous directors" in playing "a brat who is slaving to find her inner decency and barely has the equipment for such an achievement, let alone to serve a meal whose salmonella potential could claim an entire borough. Yet it is her surliness, as well as her intransigent determination to make Thanksgiving work, that keeps the laughs coming." Holmes also received a Satellite Award for Best Actress for the role. On the November 9, 2003, episode, she was Punk'd by Ashton Kutcher and the next year she was the subject of an episode of the MTV program Diary.

Holmes was a contender for the role of Christine Daaé in 2004's The Phantom of the Opera, but lost the role to Emmy Rossum. That year, she starred as the U.S. President's daughter in First Daughter, which was originally slated to be released in January 2004 on the same day as Chasing Liberty, another film about a president's daughter, but was ultimately released in September 2004, to negative reviews and low ticket sales. First Daughter, directed by Forest Whitaker, also starred Michael Keaton as her character's father and Marc Blucas as her love interest. Kirk Honeycutt called her character Samantha Mackenzie "a startling example of how a studio film can dumb down and neutralize the comic abilities of a lively young star." In the 2005 film Batman Begins she played Rachel Dawes, an attorney in the Gotham City district attorney's office and the childhood sweetheart of the title character. Variety was unenthusiastic. "Holmes is OK", was its critic's sole remark on her performance. She was nominated for a Golden Raspberry for "worst supporting actress" for the film.

In 2005, Holmes characterised her film career as being a string of "bombs." "Usually I'm not even in the top ten", she said, the highest-grossing film of her career then being Phone Booth. She lamented "It's not like I have a lot of stuff that's great just waiting for me to sign on to." She also appeared in the film version of Christopher Buckley's satirical novel Thank You for Smoking, about a tobacco lobbyist played by Aaron Eckhart, whom Holmes's character, a Washington reporter, seduces. Variety wrote one of the film's "sole relatively weak notes [came] from Holmes, who lacks even a hint of the wiliness of a ruthless reporter" and The New York Times said the cast was "exceptionally fine" except for Holmes, who "strain[ed] credulity" in her role. The film ended up a success, even earning a nomination for the Golden Globe Award for Best Motion Picture - Musical or Comedy. Also in 2005, Holmes had agreed to play in Shame on You, a biopic about the country singer Spade Cooley written and directed by Dennis Quaid, as the wife whom Cooley (played by Quaid) stomps to death. But the picture, set to shoot in New Orleans, Louisiana, was delayed by Hurricane Katrina, and Holmes dropped out due to her pregnancy. After her daughter with Cruise, Suri, was born in April 2006, Holmes took a hiatus from her acting career until 2008.

After speculation about Holmes reprising her role in The Dark Knight, the sequel to Batman Begins, it was finally confirmed that she would not appear. Her role was later recast with Maggie Gyllenhaal in her place. Instead, Holmes decided to star in the comedy Mad Money, opposite Diane Keaton and Queen Latifah in 2008. The film flopped. The Canadian Press criticized Holmes's performance, "While Keaton has long done zany and giddy well, and she and Latifah have an interesting contrast of personalities, Holmes' presence feels like an afterthought." The New York Times and Variety also criticized Holmes's performance in the film, with the former calling her "the movie's weakest link".

Returning to television in 2008, Holmes appeared in an episode of Eli Stone as Grace, a lawyer. Her singing and dancing was praised by Tim Stack of Entertainment Weekly. Holmes made her Broadway debut in the revival of Arthur Miller's All My Sons in October 2008. She opened to mixed reviews. Ben Brantley of The New York Times claimed "the neophyte Ms. Holmes" is a "sad casualty" of director Simon McBurney's "high concept approach" to the play. He adds that "Ms. Holmes delivers most of her lines with meaningful asperity, italicizing every word." However, the New York Daily News' Joe Dziemianowicz took a more positive view of her stage debut, writing, "Holmes, a TV and film vet, makes a fine Broadway debut. Her rather grand speech pattern takes getting used to, but she seems comfortable and adds a fitting glint of glamour." In 2009, Holmes appeared in the National Memorial Day Concert on the Mall in Washington, D.C. in a dialogue with Dianne Wiest celebrating the life of an American veteran seriously wounded in Iraq, José Pequeño.

=== 2010–present: television work and return to film ===
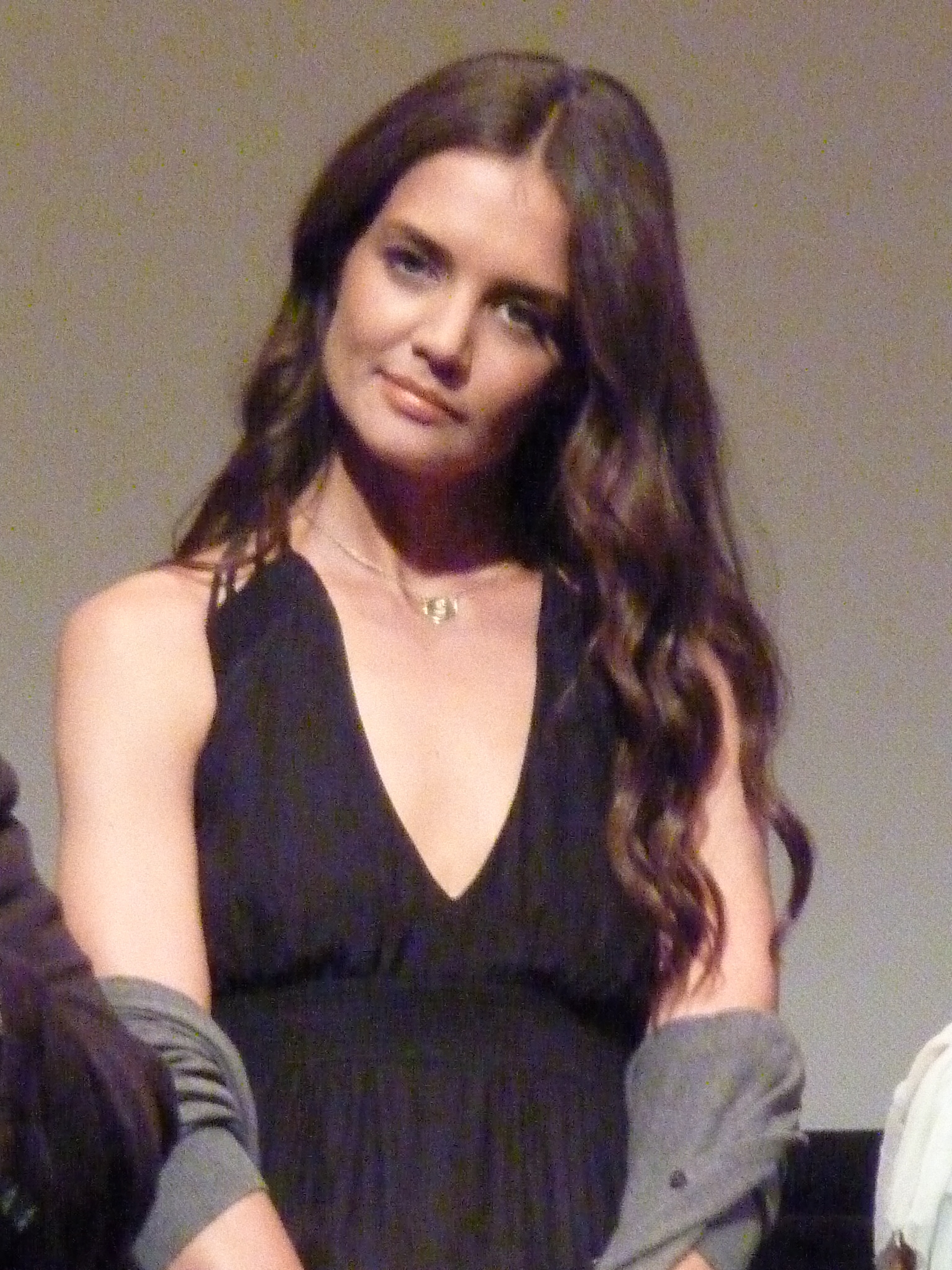
Holmes in 2011

In 2009, Holmes began filming a remake of the 1970s ABC telemovie Don't Be Afraid of the Dark; the film was released in August 2011. Also in 2011, Holmes played the role of Jackie Kennedy in the TV miniseries The Kennedys. In October 2011, she also portrayed "Slutty Pumpkin" (Naomi), in the TV show How I Met Your Mother, episode "The Slutty Pumpkin Returns". In 2012, Holmes appeared in Theresa Rebeck's new comedy Dead Accounts on Broadway. Holmes and Chace Crawford were reportedly cast as the leads in the romantic comedy Responsible Adults, to begin shooting in Los Angeles in "Fall 2011". In 2015, Holmes joined the third season of Ray Donovan. In 2015, Holmes directed a short documentary for ESPN about Olympic gymnast Nadia Comăneci titled, Eternal Princess, that premiered at the Tribeca Film Festival.

She directed her first feature film All We Had (2016), released on December 9, 2016, by Gravitas Ventures. The film stars Holmes, Stefania LaVie Owen, Luke Wilson, Richard Kind, Mark Consuelos, Judy Greer and Eve Lindley. The film follows a single mother Rita, played by Holmes, and her teenage daughter Ruthie, played by Stefania LaVie Owen. Homeless and desperate to earn money, the pair end up working at a diner in a small Midwestern town. The New York Times wrote: "The soul of the movie is the complicated mother-daughter relationship, which changes as Ruthie, who narrates the story, observes Rita making the same mistakes again and again." In 2017, Holmes starred in the heist comedy Logan Lucky, directed by Steven Soderbergh. The film received positive reviews, with many critics praising the cast's performances and Soderbergh's direction, and grossed $48 million worldwide.

In 2018, she appeared in the satirical comedy Dear Dictator, opposite Michael Caine. The same year, she made a cameo in the film Ocean's 8, starring Sandra Bullock, Cate Blanchett, Anne Hathaway, Mindy Kaling, Sarah Paulson, Rihanna, Helena Bonham Carter, and Awkwafina. The film follows a group of women led by Debbie Ocean, the sister of Danny Ocean, who plan a sophisticated heist of the annual Met Gala at the Metropolitan Museum of Art in New York City, United States. Ocean's 8 premiered at Alice Tully Hall on June 5, 2018, and was released by Warner Bros. Pictures in the United States on June 8, 2018, 11 years to the day of the release of Ocean's Thirteen. The film has grossed over $297 million worldwide. In 2019, she played in the independent film Coda alongside Patrick Stewart. The film was acclaimed by critics.

In 2020, she starred in the film Brahms: The Boy II. The film was theatrically released in the United States on February 21, 2020. and grossed $20 million worldwide against a production budget of $10 million. The same year, she was the main character in the film The Secret: Dare to Dream co-starring Josh Lucas, Jerry O'Connell and Celia Weston, which was released in the United States through video on demand, and theatrically in several countries, on July 31, 2020, by Roadside Attractions and Gravitas Ventures, following the COVID-19 pandemic. In its debut weekend, The Secret: Dare to Dream was the top-rented film on FandangoNow, second at Apple TV, seventh on the iTunes Store, and 10th on Spectrum. In its second weekend the film finished second on FandangoNow's weekly rental chart, and placed on two others.

In 2022, she wrote and directed her second film, a romantic drama named Alone Together. The film stars Katie Holmes, Jim Sturgess, Derek Luke, Melissa Leo, Zosia Mamet, and Becky Ann Baker. It premiered at the Tribeca Film Festival on July 14, 2022. It was released in the United States on July 22, 2022, by Vertical Entertainment. and was released on video on demand on July 29, 2022. In 2023, Holmes returned to the theatre starring in the off-Broadway play The Wanderers by Ann Ziegler. Holmes also directed and acted in the film Rare Objects, which was released in cinemas on April 14, 2023. The film starred also Julia Mayorga, Saundra Santiago, Candy Buckley, Giancarlo Vidrio, Derek Luke and Alan Cumming. In 2024, Holmes starred in the Broadway revival of Our Town by Thornton Wilder, portraying Mrs. Webb opposite Richard Thomas, Jim Parsons and Zoey Deutch.

In 2026, Holmes starred in an Off-Broadway revival of Hedda Gabler at The Old Globe Theatre in San Diego, California where she portrayed Hedda.

== Public image ==
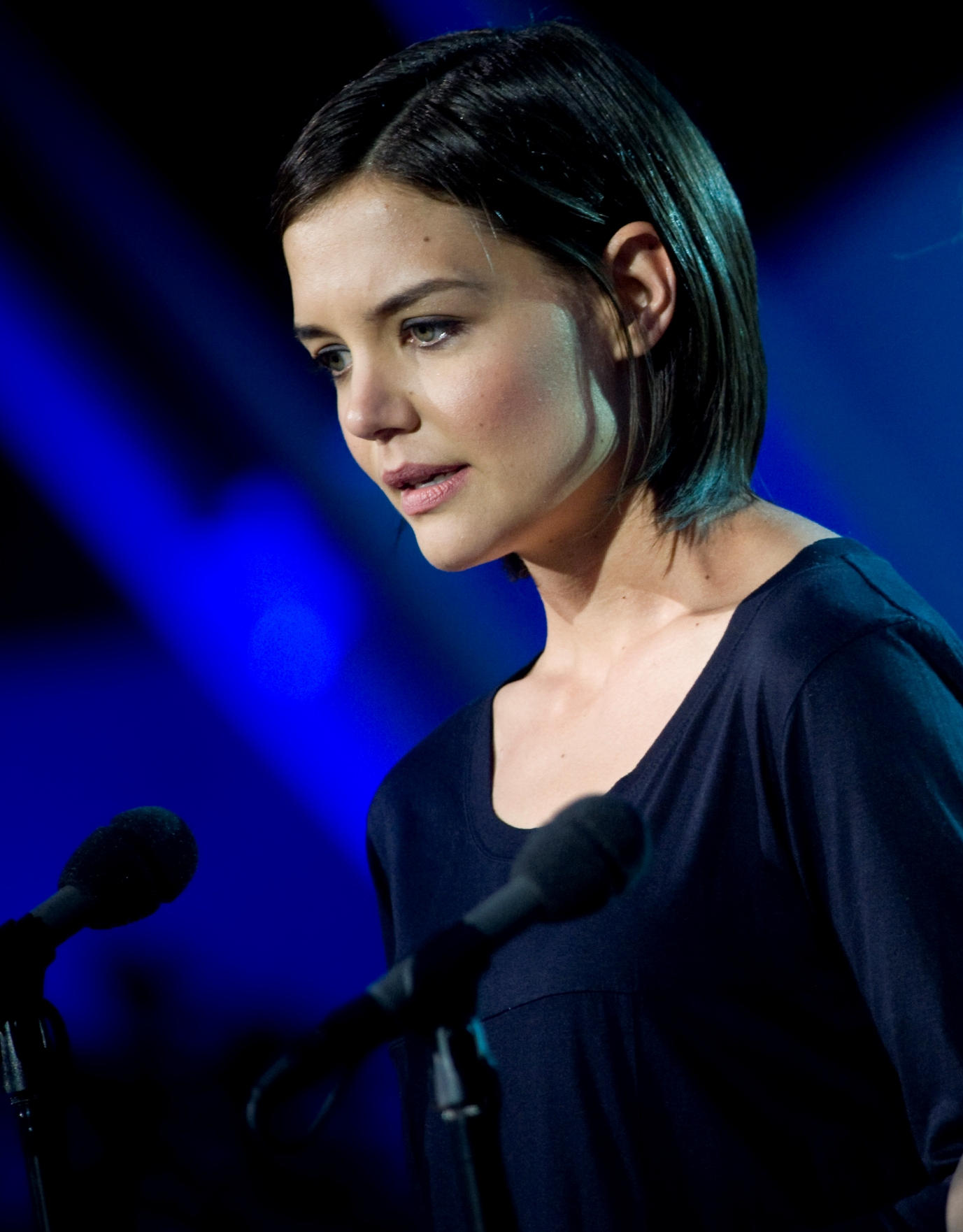
Katie Holmes in 2009

Holmes was annually named by both the British and American editions of FHM magazine as one of the sexiest women in the world from 1999 onward. She was named one of People's "50 Most Beautiful People" in 2003; its sibling Teen People declared her one of the "25 Hottest Stars Under 25" that year; and in 2005, People said she was one of the ten best dressed stars that year. She has appeared in advertisements for Garnier Lumia haircolor, Coach leather goods, and clothing retailer Gap.

In November 2008, it was confirmed that she would be the new face of the spring 2009 campaign for the high-end fashion line Miu Miu. In 2008, Holmes started a high fashion clothing line called Holmes & Yang with longtime stylist Jeanne Yang. Model Heidi Klum is a fan of the line. In July 2009, Holmes, Nigel Lythgoe, Adam Shankman, and Carrie Ann Inaba announced the launch of a dance scholarship fund called the Dizzy Feet Foundation.

Beginning January 2011, she became the new face of Ann Taylor Spring 11 collection. Holmes & Yang presented their fashion line at New York Fashion Week for the first time in September 2012. Holmes acted as the face for the Bobbi Brown Cosmetics brand in spring 2013 and Holmes had her own capsule collection of color cosmetics in fall of that year. In 2013, she appeared in an advertising campaign for IRIS Jewelry. In January 2013, Holmes was announced as the brand ambassador and co-owner of Alterna Haircare.

== Personal life ==
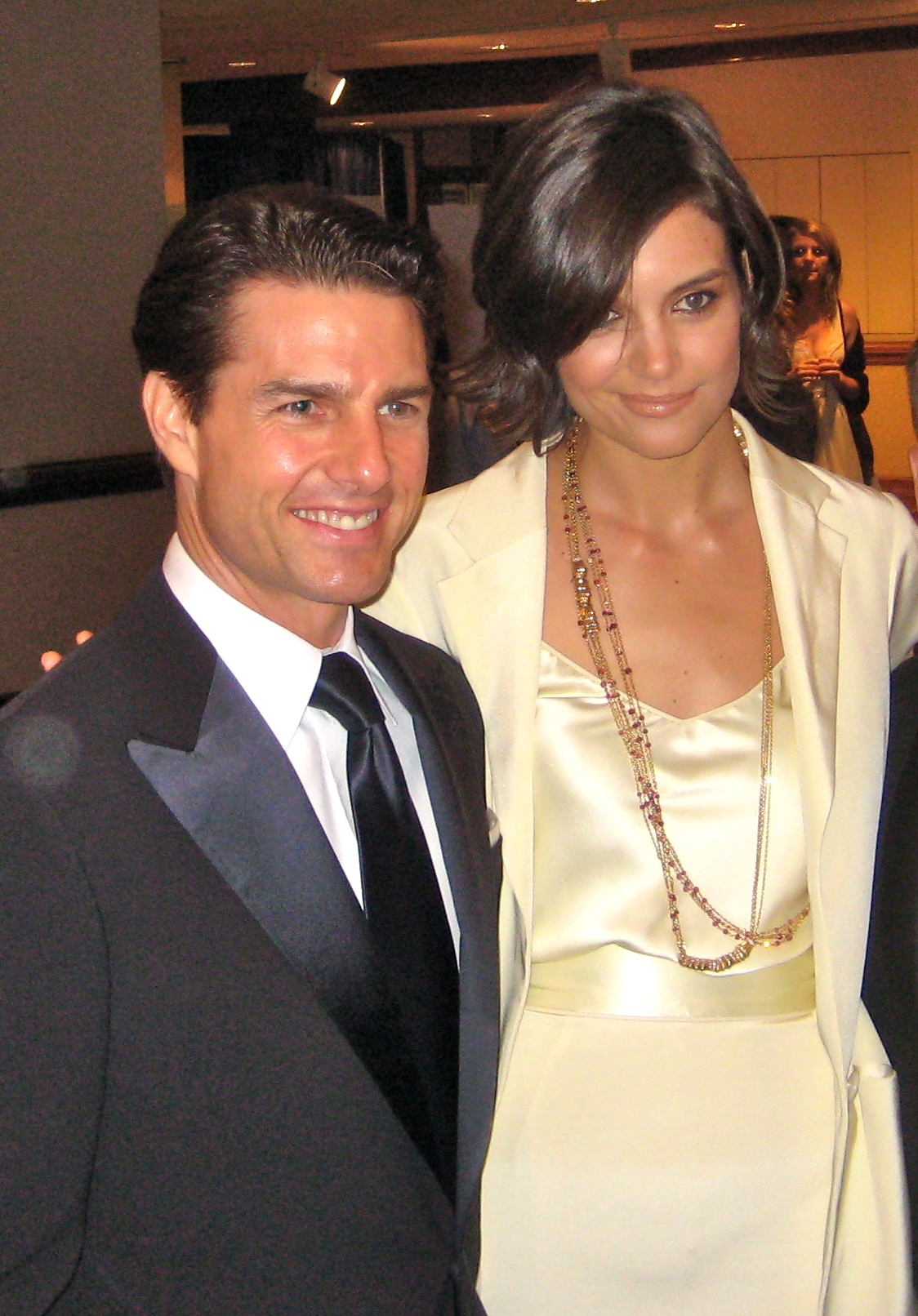
Holmes with Tom Cruise in May 2009

Holmes dated her Dawson's Creek co-star Joshua Jackson early in the show's run, which began in 1998. She said Jackson was her first love. She met actor Chris Klein in 2000. They became engaged in late 2003 but ended their relationship in early 2005. They remained friends after the breakup.

Holmes began dating actor Tom Cruise in April 2005. Holmes, who was raised a Catholic, began studying Scientology shortly after the couple began dating. They became engaged in June 2005, seven weeks after meeting. The couple's daughter was born in 2006. On November 18, 2006, Holmes and Cruise were married in a Scientologist ceremony at the 15th-century Odescalchi Castle in Bracciano, Italy. Their publicist said the couple had "officialized" their marriage in Los Angeles the day before the Italian ceremony.

In early March 2011, Holmes filed a $50-million libel lawsuit against Star magazine following a cover story that insinuated that she took drugs. The suit was settled on April 27, 2011, after which Star wrote a public apology in the May 6, 2011, issue of their magazine, and made an "undisclosed substantial donation" to Holmes's charity, Dizzy Feet Foundation.

On June 29, 2012, Holmes filed for divorce from Cruise in New York after five and a half years of marriage. Following the announcement, people close to Holmes shared that Holmes was apprehensive about intimidation by the Church of Scientology and had reason to fear that Cruise would abduct Suri. Cruise was filming in Iceland at the time. In July 2012, attorneys announced that the couple had signed a divorce settlement. This was the only divorce for Holmes and the third divorce for Cruise. Holmes got custody of their daughter. Following her divorce from Cruise, Holmes returned to the Catholic Church and began attending St. Francis Xavier Church, a Catholic parish.

Holmes dated chef Emilio Vitolo Jr. from 2020 to 2021. In 2022, she dated musician Bobby Wooten III for seven months.

== Awards ==
In June 2011, Holmes received the Women in Film Max Mara Face of the Future Award. In 2005, TV Guide ranked Holmes No. 38 on its "50 Sexiest Stars of All Time" list.

== Acting credits ==
=== Film ===
Year	Title	Role	Notes
1997	The Ice Storm	Libbets Casey	Acting debut
1998	Disturbing Behavior	Rachel Wagner	MTV Movie Award for Best Breakthrough Performance; Nominated – Saturn Award for Best Performance by a Younger Actor
1999	Go	Claire Montgomery	
1999	Teaching Mrs. Tingle	Leigh Ann Watson	Nominated – MTV Movie Award for Best Kiss; Nominated – Teen Choice Award for Film – Choice Chemistry
1999	Muppets from Space	Joey Potter	Uncredited cameo
2000	Wonder Boys	Hannah Green	
2000	The Gift	Jessica King	
2002	Abandon	Katie Burke	
2003	Phone Booth	Pamela "Pam" McFadden	
2003	The Singing Detective	Nurse Mills	
2003	Pieces of April	April Burns	Nominated – Satellite Award for Best Actress – Motion Picture Musical or Comedy
2004	First Daughter	Samantha Mackenzie	
2005	Batman Begins	Rachel Dawes	Nominated–Saturn Award for Best Supporting Actress
2005	Thank You for Smoking	Heather Holloway	
2008	Mad Money	Jackie Truman	
2010	The Extra Man	Mary Powell	
2010	The Romantics	Laura	Also executive producer
2010	Don't Be Afraid of the Dark	Kim	
2011	The Son of No One	Kerry White	
2011	Jack and Jill	Erin Sadelstein	
2013	Days and Nights	Alex	
2014	Miss Meadows	Miss Meadows	
2014	The Giver	Jonas' Mother	
2015	Woman in Gold	Pam	
2015	Touched with Fire	Carla	Also co-producer
2015	Metegol	Older Laura	Voice, English dub
2016	All We Had	Rita Carmichael	Also director and producer, feature directorial debut
2017	A Happening of Monumental Proportions	Paramedic #1	Cameo
2017	Logan Lucky	Bobbie Jo Logan Chapman	
2018	Dear Dictator	Darlene Mills	
2018	Ocean's 8	Herself	Cameo
2019	Coda	Helen Morrison	
2020	Brahms: The Boy II	Liza	
2020	The Secret: Dare to Dream	Miranda Wells	
2022	Alone Together	June	Also writer, producer and director
2023	Rare Objects	Diana Van Der Laar	Also writer, producer and director
2026	Happy Hours	Liz Jones	Also writer and director

=== Television ===
Year	Title	Role	Notes
1998–2003	Dawson's Creek	Joey Potter	Lead role (128 episodes); Nominated – Teen Choice Award for Choice TV Actress; Nominated – Teen Choice Award for Choice TV Actress – Drama; Nominated – Teen Choice Award for Choice TV Actress; Nominated – Teen Choice Award for Choice TV Actress – Drama/Action Adventure; Nominated – Teen Choice Award for Choice TV Actress
2001	Saturday Night Live	Herself	Host, episode: "Katie Holmes / Dave Matthews Band"
2008	Eli Stone	Grace	Episode: "Grace"
2011	The Kennedys	Jacqueline Kennedy	Lead role (8 episodes)
2011, 2013	How I Met Your Mother	Slutty Pumpkin (Naomi)	Episodes: "The Slutty Pumpkin Returns" and "The Poker Game"
2015	Ray Donovan	Paige Finney	Recurring role (season 3)
2017	The Kennedys: After Camelot	Jacqueline Onassis	Lead role (4 episodes), also executive producer and directed 1 episode
2018	Robot Chicken	Belle / Dee Dee	Voice, episode: "Never Forget"
2025	Poker Face	Greta	Episode: "Last Looks"

=== Theatre ===
Year	Title	Role	Playwright	Notes
2008	All My Sons	Ann Deever	Arthur Miller	Gerald Schoenfeld Theatre, Broadway
2012	Dead Accounts	Lorna	Theresa Rebeck	Music Box Theatre, Broadway
2023	The Wanderers	Julia Cheever	Ann Ziegler	Laura Pels Theatre, Off-Broadway
2024	Our Town	Mrs. Webb	Thornton Wilder	Ethel Barrymore Theatre, Broadway
2026	Hedda Gabler	Hedda Tesman	Henrik Ibsen	Old Globe Theatre, Off-Broadway

=== Video games ===
Year	Title	Role	Notes
2005	Batman Begins	Rachel Dawes	Voice

== Bibliography ==
- Scott Lyle Cohen. "Home Sweet Holmes". Giant. Issue 5. June–July 2005. 52+.
- Darren Crosdale. Dawson's Creek: The Official Companion. Kansas City, MO: Andrews McMeel, 1999. ISBN 0740707256.
- Janice Dunn. "Katie Holmes: A girl on the verge". Rolling Stone. Issue 795. September 17, 1998. 44.
- Robert Haskell. "Holmes Sweet Holmes: She's landed the role of a lifetime—beautiful bride of the world's biggest movie star. What's so weird about that?" W. August 2005. 164+
- "Katie Holmes". Current Biography. On-line database accessed February 8, 2006.
- "Katie Holmes to Wed Actor Chris Klein". Toledo Blade. December 31, 2003. D3.
- Marilyn Johnson and Andrew Southam. "Nice Girls Finish First: So what does it mean that a very nice girl playing a very thoughtful girl has become TV's teen idol? Consider it a good sign". Life. March 1999.
- Tahree Lane. "Paris proposal latest plot twist to Holmes-Cruise romance: Toledo native agrees to take on role of wife". Toledo Blade. June 18, 2005. A1.
- Judith Newman. "The Last Girl Scout". Allure. v. 13, n. 6. June 2003. 182–189.
- Graham Brough. "Honey Loon: Tom takes Scientologist Best Man away to Maldives." Daily Mirror (London). November 20, 2006. 4.
- "Cheers and Jeers." TV Guide. Issue 2516. v. 49, n. 24. June 16, 2001.
- Joanna Connors. "How do you raise a daughter like Katie?" The Plain Dealer (Cleveland, Ohio). November 2, 2003. J9.
- Roberta De Boer. "Toledo turns its attention to new breed of 'TomKat'." Toledo Blade. June 2, 2005. B1.
- Roger Ebert. "Blanchett the key to 'Gift'." Chicago Sun-Times. January 19, 2001. 29.
- Roger Ebert. " Call waiting, 'Phone Booth' a slick thriller." Chicago Sun-Times. April 4, 2003. 29.
- Renee Graham. "Sure, They're In Love—With Publicity." The Boston Globe. May 24, 2005. C1.
- Toby Harnden. "Scientology minder prompts Katie Holmes through first big interview". The Sunday Telegraph. July 10, 2005. 29.
- Mireya Navarro. "I Love You With All My Hype." The New York Times. May 22, 2005. Sec. 9, p.1.
- Philip Recchia. "Scientology 'Princess" Is A Spooky Shadow on Kooky Katie." New York Post. June 19, 2005. 4.
- Ray Richmond. "When love is just part of the marketing plan." The Hollywood Reporter. May 10, 2005. 15.
- Richard Roeper. "Admit it, you're curious: Is Tom Cruise nuts or what?" Chicago Sun-Times. June 7, 2005. 11.
- Reuters. "Cruise baby name puzzles Israelis". Today April 23, 2006 (accessed February 23, 2022).
- Kyle Smith. "Roman Ha-ha day: Why Everyone Thinks Katie & Tom Are a Joke." New York Post. April 30, 2005. 27.
- Ryan E. Smith. "Baby frenzy begins: Katie Holmes and Tom Cruise are expecting their first child together." Toledo Blade. October 6, 2005. E11.
- Holly Sorenson. "Katie Holmes." US. May 1998. 64–5.
- Anne Thompson. "Cruise vs. Pitt: a tale of two PR strategies." The Hollywood Reporter. June 10, 2005. 2.
- "Tom cult 'minder' for Katie." The Sun (London). June 15, 2005. 3.
- Debra Wallace. "Katie Holmes Heats Up." Cosmopolitan. v. 233, n. 4. October 2002. 200–203.
- Steve Weizman. "Name of celebs' baby bemuses Israelis." Chicago Tribune. April 24, 2006. 4.
- Mike Wilkinson and James Drew. "Toledo-area coin dealer counted on GOP ties to bolster business." Toledo Blade. May 15, 2005. A1.
- Simon Wright. "You're invited to Tom & Katie's wacky wedding: They take Scientology vows but mayor says the wedding isn't legal." Sunday Mirror (London). November 19, 2006. 2.
