= Ian Nelson (actor, born 1995) =

American actor

- Born: Ian Michael Nelson; April 10, 1995 (age 31); Winston-Salem, North Carolina, U.S.
- Occupation: Actor
- Years active: 2011–present

Ian Michael Nelson (born April 10, 1995) is an American actor. He played the teen version of werewolf Derek Hale in the television series Teen Wolf, Eric Palmer in the drama film The Judge, and Andy in the Hulu series There's... Johnny!.

== Personal life ==
Nelson is the son of Mark and Janie Nelson, and the youngest of four children. Nelson attended Forsyth Country Day School in Lewisville, North Carolina. He studied screenwriting at the University of Southern California. Nelson is Jewish.

== Career ==
Nelson first became interested in the performing arts by auditioning for a school musical to impress a girl. He performed in several local shows, including Piedmont Opera's Amahl and the Night Visitors. In addition to acting and singing, he is a dancer, and featured in the Macy's Thanksgiving Day Parade on three occasions. To further hone his craft, Nelson studied at the University of North Carolina School of the Arts and the Stagedoor Manor performing arts school. He also trained under Burgess Jenkins at Jenkins' Actors Group school.

His first film role was a non-speaking part as the unnamed tribute from District 3 in The Hunger Games in 2012. That was followed by Alone yet Not Alone the following year. The movie, filmed in Virginia and Tennessee, was filmed prior to The Hunger Games. Throughout 2013 and 2014, Nelson appeared in Medeas, The Judge, and The Best of Me. In 2015, he starred in The Boy Next Door as Kevin, the son of Jennifer Lopez and John Corbett. Nelson described the experience as a "great role", stating he really enjoyed the collaboration with director Rob Cohen.

Nelson's first foray into television was in the role of a teen were-wolf Derek Hale in Teen Wolf. He appeared as the teenaged version of Tyler Hoechlin's character in three episodes throughout the third and fourth seasons. He went on to appear in Criminal Minds and Comedy Bang! Bang!, before earning a recurring role as Parker in The Deleted, which aired in 2016. Nelson stars as Andy on There's...Johnny!, a show depicting the backstage workings of The Tonight Show during Johnny Carson's tenure in the 1970s. The series was released on Hulu in November 2017. He starred in the 2020 drama film Paper Spiders opposite Stefania LaVie Owen and Lili Taylor.

== Filmography ==
=== Film ===
Year	Title	Role	Notes	Ref.
2012	The Hunger Games	District 3 Male Tribute		
2013	Alone yet Not Alone	Young Owen Gibson		
2013	Medeas	Micah		
2014	The Judge	Eric Palmer		
2014	The Best of Me	Jared Reynolds		
2015	The Boy Next Door	Kevin Peterson		
2017	Freak Show	Mark "Flip" Kelly		
2017	Like Me	Burt Walden		
2019	Summer Night	Seth		
2020	Paper Spiders	Daniel		

=== Television ===
Year	Title	Role	Notes	Ref.
2013–2014	Teen Wolf	Teen Derek Hale	3 episodes	
2014	Criminal Minds	William Pratt	Episode: "Hashtag"	
2015	Comedy Bang! Bang!	Craig Wilson	Episode: "Simon Helberg Wears a Sky Blue Button Down and Jeans"	
2015	Legends	Teen Curtis Ballard	Episode: "The Legend of Curtis Ballard"	
2016	The Deleted	Parker	7 episodes	
2017	Law and Order: Special Victims Unit	Eric Hendricks	Episode: "Decline and Fall"	
2017	There's...Johnny!	Andy Klavin	Series lead (7 episodes)	

=== Video games ===
Year	Title	Role	Notes	Ref.
2022	Need for Speed Unbound	Speedie	Voice role, male version	

== Theater ==
- Amahl and the Night Visitors – Amahl
- 13 – Archie Walker
- West Side Story – Baby John
- Oliver! – Artful Dodger
- The Secret Garden – Colin Craven
- You're a Good Man Charlie Brown – Linus van Pelt
- Joseph and the Amazing Technicolor Dreamcoat – Joseph
