= Paper Spiders =

2020 American drama film

- Directed by: Inon Shampanier
- Written by: Natalie Shampanier; Inon Shampanier
- Produced by: Ash Christian; Anne Clements
- Starring: Lili Taylor; Stefania LaVie Owen; Peyton List; Ian Nelson
- Cinematography: Zach Kuperstein
- Edited by: Joe Murphy
- Music by: Ariel Blumenthal
- Production companies: Cranium Entertainment; Idiot Savant Pictures
- Distributed by: Entertainment Squad
- Release dates: September 24, 2020 (Boston Film Festival); May 7, 2021
- Running time: 110 minutes
- Country: United States
- Language: English

Paper Spiders is a 2020 American drama film directed by Inon Shampanier, written by Natalie and Inon Shampanier, and starring Lili Taylor and Stefania LaVie Owen. It tells the story of a high school girl struggling to help her mother, whose paranoid delusions spiral out of control. It is described as "a bittersweet story about coming of age in the shadow of mental illness."

== Plot ==
Dawn recently lost her husband and experiences growing anxiety as her daughter Melanie plans to move away for college. An argument with a hostile new neighbor aggravates Dawn's mental condition, and she begins to show signs of paranoid delusions. Determined to help her mom, Melanie attempts a series of interventions, hoping that her guidance counselor, a private investigator or even a new date may help, but to no avail. Melanie navigates her friendship with Lacy and romance with the troubled Daniel while trying to keep her mother afloat, but challenging Dawn's reality of persecution threatens to destroy their loving relationship. Melanie is forced to make the toughest of choices as she struggles to support her mother on the path toward recovery and healing.

== Cast ==
- Lili Taylor as Dawn
- Stefania LaVie Owen as Melanie
- Peyton List as Lacy
- Ian Nelson as Daniel
- David Rasche as Bill
- Max Casella as Gary
- Michael Cyril Creighton as Mr. Wessler
- Tom Papa as Howard
- Jennifer Cody as Mrs. Jensen
- Hunter Foster as Professor Stern
- Deanna McKinney as Officer Gina Morales
- Susannah Berryman as Psychiatrist
- Tanya Thompson as Principal

== Production ==
The film was shot in Syracuse, New York in May 2019.

== Premiere ==
The film premiered at the Boston Film Festival on September 24, 2020, where it won the top prizes for Best Film, Best Actress (Lili Taylor), Best Screenplay and Best Ensemble Cast.

== Release ==
The film was released on May 7, 2021 in select theaters and on VOD platforms. The release was slated for Mother's Day Weekend and Mental Health Awareness Month.

== Reception ==
The review aggregator website Rotten Tomatoes assessed all 44 critics' reviews as positive for a 100% rating. The critics' consensus reads: "A coming-of-age drama that thoughtfully handles hard-hitting themes, Paper Spiders is anchored by heartbreaking performances from its leads." The film was included on Rotten Tomatoes Top 10 Best Films of 2021. Katie Walsh of the Los Angeles Times wrote: "Taylor plays Dawn’s slide into this mental health crisis beautifully, and with conviction, and Stefania Owen is stunning [...] Along with the emotionally stripped performances of Taylor and Owen, that personal experience brings a rare honesty and authenticity to this film about mental illness." Sheri Linden of The Hollywood Reporter called it "A message film spiked with welcome humor, and its excellent cast is led by the reliably compelling Lili Taylor". Lili Taylor received a Gotham Award nomination for her Outstanding Lead Performance in the film.
