= All We Had =

- Theatrical release poster
- Directed by: Katie Holmes
- Screenplay by: Josh Boone; Jill Killington
- Based on: All We Had by Annie Weatherwax
- Produced by: Katie Holmes; Katie Mustard; Jane Rosenthal; Berry Welsh
- Starring: Katie Holmes; Stefania LaVie Owen; Richard Kind; Mark Consuelos; Eve Lindley; Judy Greer; Luke Wilson
- Cinematography: Brett Pawlak
- Edited by: Robb Sullivan
- Music by: Michael Brook
- Production companies: Straight Shot Films; Jaro/Noelle Production; Mustard & Company
- Distributed by: Gravitas Ventures
- Release dates: April 15, 2016 (Tribeca Film Festival); December 9, 2016 (United States)
- Running time: 86 minutes
- Country: United States
- Language: English

All We Had is a 2016 American drama film directed by Katie Holmes and written by Josh Boone. It is based on the 2014 novel All We Had by Annie Weatherwax. The film stars Katie Holmes, Stefania LaVie Owen, Luke Wilson, Richard Kind, Mark Consuelos, Judy Greer and Eve Lindley. The film was released on December 9, 2016, by Gravitas Ventures.

All We Had is the directorial debut of Katie Holmes and she dedicated the film to her daughter, Suri.

== Plot ==
Set during the 2008 worldwide financial crisis, single mother Rita Carmichael and her teenage daughter Ruthie are constantly running when Rita's relationships go bad. They are heading towards Boston for a new adventure when they have car trouble, which drains most of their money.

Stopping at Tiny's, a diner in a small Midwestern town, Rita and Ruthie plan to eat and pull a runner, but the car acts up again. Rita bravely marches back in and explains their desperate situation, hoping for compassion. Marty gives them both work there, so they slowly get back on their feet.

After a few days, Rita and Ruthie move from sleeping in their car to a bed in the back of the diner. Soon Ruthie feels like they've found a new home and has hope for their future. She befriends Pam, another waitperson at the diner who's also on her own.

Before long, Rita gets involved with real estate agent Vic. After he secures them a small house, she and Ruthie manage to get credit and buy lots of things to fill the house.

Ruthie starts at the local high school. Befriending a classmate, she soon gets mixed up with substance abusers and caught by the principal. She's given a three-day suspension.

Rita falls ill, but as they're poor, she tries to self-medicate with Nyquil. She seems to more or less recover. By the time Ruthie's suspension is over, on her return to school, she doesn't feel interested in the group that had landed her in trouble.

One evening at the diner, they allow a group of young men to order after hours. Rita sends Ruthie home, but feeling ill at ease, she returns. Seeing the young men trying to rape Pam in the parking lot, Ruthie hurries inside for help. Marty and Rita are drunk and oblivious, so she takes the gun from behind the counter.

Wielding the weapon, since three years earlier she'd seen her mother raped, Ruthie threatens to shoot them if they don't free Pam. Rita comes out, taking the gun from her and chasing them off. When she acts worried for Ruthie, she is accused of being drunk and not being there when needed.

Both women support Pam, encouraging her to make herself up again and feel better. Meanwhile, Rita has been going to AA since the incident. There, she meets Lee again, a diner customer who had vomited at her feet months ago when he was on a bender, having lost his wife a few years ago.

Lee and Rita are dating when the financial crisis hits, and the bank forecloses on Ruthie and her home. Lee is a dentist and offers to let them move in with him. Initially resistant, Rita changes her mind when the diner closes down.

After some time, Ruthie tries to get her mother to leave again. When she refuses, Ruthie takes off and ends up at a high school party. She doesn't stay long since she has an altercation with a former friend. Upset, Ruthie goes to Pam's trailer. Rita finds her there in the morning and they make up.

As Rita lets the now 15-year-old Ruthie drive them back to their home with Lee, they drive under trees that are again changing their color for the second time...Ruthie has finally found a home.

== Cast ==
- Katie Holmes as Rita Carmichael
- Stefania LaVie Owen as Ruthie Carmichael
- Luke Wilson as Lee
- Richard Kind as Marty
- Mark Consuelos as Vic
- Judy Greer as Patti
- Eve Lindley as Pam
- Siobhan Fallon Hogan as Mrs. Frankfurt
- Katherine Reis as Sally
- Odiseas Gregory Georgiadis as Ben
- Amber Jones/Amber the Fangirl as a Girl
- Alexander Bender/AmazzonKane as Jenny

== Production ==
On July 30, 2014, Katie Holmes optioned the film rights to the 2014 novel All We Had by Annie Weatherwax. On September 11, 2014, it was announced Holmes would direct the film. Holmes met with filmmaker Josh Boone about writing the screenplay, and Boone brought on frequent collaborator Jill Killington to co-write the screenplay with him. On July 31, 2015, Stefania LaVie Owen joined the cast of the film. On September 9, 2015, Mark Consuelos joined the cast of the film. Principal photography began on August 5, 2015, and ended on September 4, 2015.

== Release and reception ==
The film premiered at the Tribeca Film Festival on April 15, 2016. The film was released on December 9, 2016, by Gravitas Ventures.

On review aggregator Rotten Tomatoes, the film holds an approval rating of 40% based on 25 reviews, with an average rating of 5.2/10. On Metacritic, the film has a weighted average score of 48 out of 100, based on 13 critics, indicating "mixed or average" reviews. The Guardian gave the film three out of five stars, writing: "A stellar, brazen performance by the Dawson’s Creek actor and her strong cast keep this film, about the bond between a wayward mother and daughter, afloat." The New York Times wrote: "The soul of the movie is the complicated mother-daughter relationship, which changes as Ruthie, who narrates the story, observes Rita making the same mistakes again and again." The New York Times added: "What’s missing is texture and detail in a movie (with a screenplay by Josh Boone and Jill Killington) that crowds too much plot into too little space. It’s easy to see how All We Had might have been better if stretched into a multipart television series."
