= The Boy Next Door (film) =

2015 film by Rob Cohen

- Theatrical release poster
- Directed by: Rob Cohen
- Written by: Barbara Curry
- Produced by: Jason Blum; John Jacobs; Elaine Goldsmith-Thomas; Benny Medina; Jennifer Lopez
- Starring: Jennifer Lopez; Ryan Guzman; John Corbett; Ian Nelson; Kristin Chenoweth
- Cinematography: Dave McFarland
- Edited by: Michel Aller
- Music by: Randy Edelman; Nathan Barr
- Production companies: Smart Entertainment; Blumhouse Productions; Nuyorican Productions
- Distributed by: Universal Pictures
- Release date: January 23, 2015 (United States)
- Running time: 91 minutes
- Country: United States
- Language: English
- Budget: $4 million
- Box office: $53.4 million

The Boy Next Door is a 2015 American psychological thriller film directed by Rob Cohen and written by Barbara Curry. The film stars Jennifer Lopez, Ryan Guzman, and Ian Nelson, with John Corbett and Kristin Chenoweth playing supporting roles. The film follows a 19-year-old boy who, after having a one-night stand with his high school teacher, develops a dangerous and deranged obsession with her.

Barbara Curry, a former criminal lawyer, wrote the screenplay for the film inspired from her life's experiences. Blumhouse Productions financed and produced the film, which was filmed for 23 days in Los Angeles and other locations in California at the end of 2013.

The film was released in the United States on January 23, 2015, by Universal Pictures. The Boy Next Door received generally negative reviews from film critics but was a box office success, grossing $53.4 million against a $4 million budget. It was released on Blu-ray and DVD on April 28, 2015.

== Plot ==
Claire Peterson is a high school English Literature teacher living alone with her teenage son, Kevin, after separating from her husband, Garrett, due to his infidelity. 19-year-old Noah Sandborn, an orphan whose parents died a year prior, moves in next door to help his uncle, who uses a wheelchair. Noah promptly charms Claire and befriends Kevin, often teaching him handyman skills around their house, and begins attending his school, where she teaches.

While Kevin and Garrett go on a fishing trip, Claire reluctantly goes on a double date with her best friend and the school vice principal, Vicky Lansing. As Claire returns home, Noah invites her over for dinner at his home to which she accepts, during which he unashamedly flirts with and undresses her. With Claire losing control of herself, the two eventually have passionate sex. The following morning, Claire awakens and says that she regrets their one-night stand together, which Noah doesn't take well. As the school year begins, Noah hacks into Claire's computer, sending an e-mail to the principal requesting a transfer for himself into her class, and continues to hang out with Kevin, manipulating him into hating Garrett. When Kevin overexerts at gym class and goes into shock one day, Noah saves his life by injecting him with his EpiPen. Claire confronts Noah after he sends her flowers, thanking him for helping Kevin. However, after witnessing Garrett spending the evening with Claire at her home, Noah has flashbacks of him and Claire having sex, escalating his obsession with her.

After an incident where Noah violently assaults school bully Jason Zimmer for harassing Kevin, Vicky discovers that Noah was kicked out of his previous school for disorderly conduct and expels him after he aggressively insults her. At the school dance, Noah confronts Claire in the bathroom and reveals his obsession with her, before attempting to rape her, she attacks him and leaves, demanding that he stay away from her and Kevin. That night, Claire sees Noah having sex with Allie, Kevin's classmate and prom date. The next day, Noah leaves a printer running in Claire's classroom, with pictures of them sleeping together scattered around, but Claire removes all the photos before her students arrive. Later, when Garrett's car brakes fail, he and Kevin narrowly escape serious injury. Noah attempts to blackmail Claire with a video of them having sex, claiming he will surrender it if she continues sleeping with him, but she refuses.

Claire asks Vicky to lure Noah away from his house so she can break in and delete the video. While there, she finds nude pictures of herself on the walls along with instructions on tampering with the brakes of both Garrett's and his parents' cars, prompting her to speak with a detective about the fatal car crash that killed Noah's parents. Meanwhile, Noah holds Vicky hostage and lures Claire to her house. When Claire arrives, she finds Vicky dead and calls 911, but Noah appears. When she accuses him of killing his parents, he clarifies that his mother killed herself after his father cheated on her, and he retaliated by cutting his father's car's brakes, killing him and his mistress.

Noah takes Claire to a barn where he has Garrett and Kevin tied up, claiming he intends to kill them so that he can start a new life with her together, while demanding that Claire be with him or die with her family. He starts a fire, and a struggle ensues, during which Noah wounds Garrett and once more attempts to get Claire to leave with him, only for Claire to finally destroy Noah's obsession by stabbing him in the eye with the EpiPen. Enraged, Noah attempts to kill all three, but Claire, after denouncing him as "no hero", pulls a lever that drops an engine on Noah, ultimately killing him. Claire and Kevin then help a wounded Garrett out of the burning barn as the police and paramedics arrive. It is implied that Claire and Garrett are going to reconcile.

== Cast ==
- Jennifer Lopez as Claire Peterson
- Ryan Guzman as Noah Sandborn
- Ian Nelson as Kevin Peterson
- John Corbett as Garrett Peterson
- Kristin Chenoweth as Vicky Lansing
- Lexi Atkins as Allie Callahan
- Hill Harper as Principal Edward Warren
- Jack Wallace as Mr. Sandborn
- Travis Schuldt as Ethan
- Brian Mahoney as Cooper
- Adam Hicks as Jason Zimmer
- François Chau as Detective Johnny Chou
- Bailey Chase as Benny

== Production ==
=== Conception and writing ===
Screenwriter Barbara Curry, who was a criminal lawyer for ten years, revealed that she created the script's original concept after running past a house which she described as her "dream house". Her son went to school with a boy who resided in the house across the street, which gave her a "really interesting" concept about a neighborhood boy creating conflict and "driving a wedge between a family". This served as her inspiration for the screenplay.

Curry stated that the "first few drafts of [the movie] focused on a 12-year-old boy and a mother's trial of trying to get her son out of this boy's clutches, and gradually, it became something else". In the original script, Claire was "happily married", but Curry chose to have her separated due to her husband's infidelity, so that she could be a "more sympathetic character". Curry was influenced by the real-life story of Mary Kay Letourneau, a teacher who became involved with her underage student, causing her to be convicted for rape charges. Director Rob Cohen revealed that in Curry's draft, the character of Noah was younger, but he made the conscious decision to age him to 19, because he felt as if it was "not healthy" and that audiences would lose sympathy for the protagonist. Explaining her character, Lopez stated that Claire was feeling "worthless" after her husband cheated, and "People can understand that. They can understand making a mistake in a moment like that."

The Boy Next Door's plot has been compared to the thriller films Basic Instinct (1992) and Swimfan (2002), while being dubbed "the Fatal Attraction of 2015". The formerly dominant erotic thriller genre had been fading from Hollywood features since the 1990s. Director Rob Cohen stated that with the film, he wanted to "reinvent the genre in an entertaining way" that would reflect "2015, not 1990".

=== Pre-production ===
Casting of The Boy Next Door began early September 2013, when Jennifer Lopez was chosen to play Claire. Kristin Chenoweth was later cast in the film as Lopez's character's friend. In October 2013, John Corbett and Ryan Guzman were cast in the film, with Corbett playing Lopez's ex-husband and Guzman playing the titular role. After an audition, newcomer Lexi Atkins was also cast in the film for a small role.

Lopez, who also served as producer on the film, chose a fellow Latino actor Guzman to cast in the film, stating that "two Latinos opening in a mainstream movie, if it does well, that's gonna change things. I would love for the Latino community to come out and support this movie because it would give us the freedom." She also stated that "We [Latinos] don't have to be close-minded, where two Latinos have to be speaking Spanish or they have to have some Latin reference in the movie... That's what I love about this film. We're breaking down the walls and stereotypes."

=== Filming ===
"And again, being so intense, being 25 days and knowing we had so much to accomplish in each day, it was sometimes looking at the call sheet and going, 'How the hell are we going to do this all in one day?' We have to be a real team, and so we did have fun and we did have great communication."

— Lopez on filming The Boy Next Door

On his approach, Cohen said that he refused to consider making the film PG-13: "The first thing I said was, 'If you want me, I'm making an R-rated movie. I don't want to deal with sex and make it, like, for 13-year-olds.'" The film took 23 days to shoot. Discussing its micro-budget, Lopez stated: "You know what, we put all four million dollars in front of the camera! We all shared one trailer, we had no craft service, it wasn't that type of luxury movie set, let's say." She also found that the limited budget and filming period was "super intense", saying: "I never had done a film like that in my career. That was the first time we did that, but it was very liberating as an artist because it made me realize I can make whatever movie I want like this." On filming sex scenes, Guzman said "that was the time in the film when I was the most uncomfortable. We had to choreograph every piece... It was the most unsexy-really-sexy scene that you'll see on screen." Filming took place throughout fall 2013 in Los Angeles. In December 2013, the film received permit to shoot in Placerita Canyon, Newhall. Some of the remaining scenes were also filmed in April 2014.

== Release ==
The film's main demographic is women and Latinos. Lopez made her largest Hispanic press tour to date in Miami in promotion of The Boy Next Door. She hoped that the film would appeal to Hispanic markets, due to featuring two Hispanic leads, which she stated might not have been possible if a big studio had produced it. She visited ¡Despierta América! and Nuestra Belleza Latina, shows which air on the Latin American network Univision, the latter of which saw 22% ratings gain with Lopez's appearance. According to Variety, the film received 105,000 posts on Twitter by the day of its release. Measuring the film's pros and cons, Boxoffice magazine said that the film's social media activity online and Lopez's pull with Latino audiences would help it. However, the publication said that Lopez's box office drawing power had been dwindling, which worked against the film.

The film was released on January 23, 2015. It runs for approximately 90 minutes and was given an R rating from the MPAA for "violence, sexual content/nudity, and language". A BBFC classification, dated February 9, 2015, gives the film a 15 certificate for "strong violence, threat, very strong language". The film's UK distributors, also Universal Studios, chose to remove two seconds of material, the eye gouging scene, in order to obtain a 15. There is an 18-rated version available.

=== Home media ===
The Boy Next Door was released on Blu-ray and DVD on April 28, 2015. It has earned $7.2 million from domestic home video sales.

== Reception ==
=== Box office ===
Opening across 2,602 North American theaters, The Boy Next Door was projected to pull in $12–15 million over its opening weekend. The film earned $5.7 million on its opening day, surpassing its budget. It opened at number two at the US box office, with an opening weekend gross of $14.9 million, finishing as the top new release for that week. The Hollywood Reporter revealed that 45 percent of the film's opening week audience was Hispanic, while 71 percent of the overall audience was female. The film became Lopez's best opening weekend for a January release, beating her romantic comedy The Wedding Planner (2001) which opened with $13.5 million. It was also her best opening weekend for a thriller film, ahead of Angel Eyes (2001, $9.2 million), Enough (2002, $14 million), and Parker (2013, $7 million). Furthermore, it is Lopez's biggest live-action opening since 2005's Monster-in-Law. The Boy Next Door ended its domestic box office run with a total of $36.0 million, and has earned another $17.4 million in foreign markets, making a total of $53 million.

=== Critical response ===
The Boy Next Door received generally negative reviews from film critics, who felt that it promised "campy thrills" but did not deliver. On Rotten Tomatoes, the film holds a rating of 12%, based on 136 reviews, with a rating average of 3.40/10. The site's consensus reads: "The Boy Next Door may get a few howls out of fans of stalker thrillers, but for most viewers, it won't even rise to 'so bad it's good' status." On Metacritic, the film has a score of 30 out of 100, based on 33 critics, indicating "generally unfavorable reviews". Audiences polled by CinemaScore, during the opening weekend, gave the film a grade of "B−" on an A+ to F scale.

Writing for the San Francisco Chronicle, Thomas Lee wrote: "Why Lopez decided to do this inept, cliche-infested film is anyone's guess". Peter Keough of The Boston Globe wrote that "[the film] may end up as one of the worst movies of 2015, but it is also one of the most entertaining". The Guardian writer Jordan Hoffman gave the film two stars, writing that "it is bad, but it isn't THAT bad", and said: "for a would-be cult classic, this could have been much more". Robert Abele of the Los Angeles Times was critical of The Boy Next Door, calling it "breathless, uninspired (...) junk that feels like the iffiest bits of a Lifetime movie and late-night cable schlock slapped together", calling Guzman's character boring. Entertainment Weekly's Leah Greenblatt similarly wrote that the film was a "few deliciously bonkers bons mots dot the Lifetime-grade dialogue", while calling its script "too timid to fully dive into the high camp it hints at".

Despite negative reviews, Lopez received praise for her performance. Richard Lawson from Vanity Fair wrote: "Given the material, Lopez is actually pretty darn good in the movie, taking it seriously enough that it's not irksomely arch camp, but also plenty aware that she's not doing Shakespeare. She's a joy to watch throughout." Claudia Puig from USA Today stated that the movie was an improvement on her previous romantic comedies, calling Lopez "believably powerful in moments of physical conflict". Although he called the film "clunky and ridiculous", Daniel D'Addario from Time said it is "a rare movie about women" and "the Bad Movie Hollywood Needs Right Now". D'Addario added that the film feels "perversely refreshing" for its focus on women's issues.

Several publications particularly criticized the scene where Noah gives Claire a printed book that is supposed to be a first edition copy of the Iliad, a work written nearly 3,000 years ago in Ancient Greece. Amy Heidt, writing for Slate, noted that while a first English edition could have been a possible explanation, such works were from the 16th and 17th centuries, and describes the book Noah gives Claire as "A pristine hardcover that looks like those Jane Austen Penguin Classics they sell at Urban Outfitters." Following the film's release, the term "The Iliad, first edition" became the top search term on the online book marketplace AbeBooks. Richard Davis, a spokesman for the website, said: "It appears people who have watched the film are trying to identify the actual edition handed to Lopez, which has dark yellow and blue boards. I cannot match the book seen in the movie to anything currently for sale on AbeBooks." Carolyn Kellogg of the Los Angeles Times identified the book as an 1884 edition published by Donohue & Henneberry.

=== Accolades ===
The film earned Lopez an MTV Movie Award nomination and win for Best Scared-As-Shit Performance at the 2015 MTV Movie Awards. Lopez later received two more accolades for her work as an actress and as a producer in film at the Premios Juventud, broadcast by Univision. Lopez earned a People's Choice Award nomination for Favorite Dramatic Movie Actress, the movie was nominated for Favorite Thriller Movie. The movie received one Golden Raspberry Award nomination for Lopez in the Worst Actress category.

Year	Award	Category	Recipient	Result
2015	MTV Movie Award	Best Scared-As-Shit Performance	Jennifer Lopez	Won
2015	Premios Juventud	Actriz que Se Roba La Pantalla (Favorite Actress)	Jennifer Lopez	Won
2015	Premios Juventud	Pantalla Más Padre (Favorite Movie)	Jennifer Lopez, Jason Blum	Won
2016	People's Choice Award	Favorite Dramatic Movie Actress	Jennifer Lopez	Nominated
2016	People's Choice Award	Favorite Thriller Movie	The Boy Next Door	Nominated
2016	Golden Raspberry Awards	Worst Actress	Jennifer Lopez	Nominated
