= There's... Johnny! =

US television series

- Genre: Comedy drama
- Created by: Paul Reiser; David Steven Simon
- Written by: Paul Reiser; David Steven Simon
- Starring: Ian Nelson; Jane Levy; T'Keyah Crystal Keymáh; Tony Danza
- Composer: Steven Argila
- Country of origin: United States
- Original language: English
- No. of seasons: 1
- No. of episodes: 7

Production
- Executive producers: Paul Reiser; David Steven Simon; David Gordon Green; Jeff Sotzing; Brian Volk-Weiss; Cisco Henson; Michael Pelmont; Matt Ochacher; Craig Knizek
- Producers: Carl Craig; Brandon James
- Cinematography: Benjamin Kasulke
- Editors: Jeff Seibenick; Jeff Israel; Phillip Bartell
- Camera setup: Single-camera
- Running time: 20–32 minutes
- Production companies: Nuance Productions; Rough House Pictures; Comedy Dynamics

Original release
- Network: Hulu (Note: There's... Johnny! was ordered by Seeso and originally scheduled to premiere on that streaming service. Following the service's closure, Hulu acquired the rights to stream the series.)
- Release: November 16, 2017

There's... Johnny! is an American comedy-drama streaming television series created by Paul Reiser and David Steven Simon and starring Ian Nelson, Jane Levy, T'Keyah Crystal Keymáh, and Tony Danza. The series takes place in the 1970s and depicts the fictional goings-on behind the scenes of The Tonight Show Starring Johnny Carson. The series was ordered by streaming service Seeso and had been scheduled to premiere on August 24, 2017, but that release was canceled due to Seeso's closure. The streaming service Hulu subsequently acquired the streaming rights to the series and released all seven produced episodes on November 16, 2017.

== Premise ==
There's... Johnny! follows "the lives and challenges of Andy, a wide-eyed 19-year-old Nebraskan who stumbles his way into a job at The Tonight Show Starring Johnny Carson and Joy, a young Talent Coordinator on the show, as they both try to find their way and prove themselves in this period of cultural and political upheaval." The series also touches on "major historical events of the time, including the Vietnam War, Nixon, and the strengthening counter-culture, as well the show’s status as one of the most popular and important cultural institution of its day."

== Cast and characters ==
=== Main ===
- Ian Nelson as Andy Klavin, a young man from Nebraska who, after writing a fan letter to The Tonight Show Starring Johnny Carson, finds himself accepting a job and moving to Los Angeles.
- Jane Levy as Joy Greenfield, The Tonight Show's talent coordinator.
- T'Keyah Crystal Keymáh as Roz, Johnny Carson's secretary
- Tony Danza as Fred de Cordova, a producer on The Tonight Show.

=== Recurring ===
- Roger Bart as Angelo
- Nate Smith as Mike, a writer for The Tonight Show
- David Hoffman as Jim, a writer for The Tonight Show
- Daniel Strauss as Alan, a writer for The Tonight Show
- Andrew Schulz as Mitch, a writer for The Tonight Show
- Camrus Johnson as Rasheed, Andy's neighbor and friend
- Alison Martin as Lorraine Klavin, Andy's mother
- Abigail Klein as Chrissy-Ann Aldean, a beauty pageant winner from Andy's hometown who arrives in Hollywood
- Don Stark as Bernie Greenfield, Joy's father who holds a powerful position within the entertainment industry
- Johnny Ferro as Buddy Klavin, Andy's brother who returns after serving in the Vietnam War.
- Ari Frenkel as Tom Donahue
- Reggie A. Green as a security guard

=== Guest ===
- Josh Randall as Officer ("Dog Day Afternoon")
- Joseph Anderson as Stagehand ("Dog Day Afternoon")
- Kevin Pollak as the phone voice of Albert Brooks ("Dog Day Afternoon")
- Peggy Lipton as Evelyn Greenfield ("Owed to Joy")
- David Paymer as Dr. Neuberger ("Take Me to Church")
- Kate Vernon as Mrs. de Cordova ("Take Me to Church")
- Matt McCoy as Father Mike ("Take Me to Church")
- Josh Zuckerman as Justin ("Take Me to Church")
- Georgina Reilly as Sarah ("Take Me to Church")
- Dirk Blocker as Lyle ("The Getaway")
- Jesse D. Goins as Dr. William Miller ("The Getaway")

== Episodes ==
No.	Title	Directed by	Written by	Original release date
1	"Andy Goes to Hollywood"	David Gordon Green	Paul Reiser & David Steven Simon	November 16, 2017
2	"Dog Day Afternoon"	David Gordon Green	Paul Reiser & David Steven Simon	November 16, 2017
3	"Owed to Joy"	Andrew Bujalski	Paul Reiser & David Steven Simon	November 16, 2017
4	"Take Me to Church"	Andrew Bujalski	Paul Reiser & David Steven Simon	November 16, 2017
5	"The Drop"	David Rogers	Paul Reiser & David Steven Simon	November 16, 2017
6	"The Getaway"	So Yong Kim	Paul Reiser & David Steven Simon	November 16, 2017
7	"The Anniversary Show"	So Yong Kim	Paul Reiser & David Steven Simon	November 16, 2017

== Production ==
"Growing up, the coolest thing imaginable was to someday get on The Tonight Show Starring Johnny Carson and make Johnny laugh. The fact that I got to do that was a dream come true, and going back now to explore that world, and pay homage to Johnny and that golden time is an absolute joy."

— Creator Paul Reiser on what inspired him to create the series

=== Development ===
On October 11, 2016, it was announced that Seeso had given the production a series order for a first season consisting of eight episodes. The series was written by Paul Reiser and David Steven Simon, both of whom were also set to executive produce alongside David Gordon Green, Jeff Sotzing, Brian Volk-Weiss, Michael Pelmont, Cisco Henson, Matt Ochacher, Evan Shapiro, Kelsey Balance, and Dan Kerstetter. Green was also slated to serve as director for the series as well and Craig Knizek was set as a producer. The series was produced in conjunction with the estate of Johnny Carson and was granted access to the full Carson archives, allowing the show to mix newly filmed content with authentic footage of Carson and his guests onscreen. Production companies involved with the series were anticipated to include Nuance Productions, Rough House Pictures, and Comedy Dynamics.

=== Casting ===
On January 23, 2017, it was announced that Tony Danza, Ian Nelson, Jane Levy, Roger Bart, T'Keyah Crystal Keymáh, Nate Smith, David Hoffman, Daniel Strauss, and Andrew Schulz had been cast in the series.

== Release ==
=== Marketing ===
On November 6, 2017, a trailer for the series was released.

=== Premiere ===
On April 27, 2017, the series held its world premiere during the Tribeca Film Festival at the SVA Theatre in New York City. Following a screening of the first episode, a conversation was held with creators Paul Reiser and David Steven Simon, executive producer David Gordon Green, and cast members Tony Danza, Ian Nelson, and Jane Levy. The conversation was moderated by journalist Bill Carter.

=== Distribution ===
On March 30, 2017, it was reported that the series would premiere on August 24, 2017. On August 9, 2017, it was announced that Seeso was shutting down and that the series would not premiere that month as previously announced. A week later, it was reported that NBCUniversal was actively searching for a new outlet for the series. On September 27, 2017, it was announced that Hulu had acquired the streaming rights to the series. On October 13, 2017, it was announced that the series would now premiere on Hulu on November 16, 2017.

== Reception ==
The series received mixed response from critics upon its premiere. On the review aggregation website Rotten Tomatoes, the first season holds an 83% approval rating, with an average rating of 7 out of 10 based on 6 reviews. Metacritic, which uses a weighted average, assigned the season a score of 60 out of 100 based on 6 critics, indicating "mixed or average reviews".

In a mixed to negative review, The Los Angeles Times' Chris Barton praised the use of footage from The Tonight Show but criticized other aspects of the production saying, "Given its roots in comedy, There's... Johnny remains strongest in its reverent time travels with Carson as well as his fellow comedy giants such as George Carlin and Steve Martin, who also appear in Tonight Show clips. The appeal there is undeniable. But as the real world creeps in, There's... Johnny! strains under a weight that even the present is struggling to resolve." In a more positive review, Indiewire's Steve Greene gave the series a grade of "B+" and praised it saying, "There's... Johnny! is unabashedly a tribute, filtered through the glow of fondness for a time gone by. Not without its second-guessing, there’s still a lovely underpinning of specificity that finds some honesty among the nostalgia. TV is an increasingly strange business, but There's... Johnny! argues that there’s still a bit of magic in the chaos."
