= Coming Through the Rye (film) =

2015 American drama film

- Film poster
- Directed by: James Steven Sadwith
- Written by: James Steven Sadwith
- Produced by: Stan Erdreich; Teddy Grennan; James Steven Sadwith; Sara Elizabeth Timmins
- Starring: Alex Wolff; Stefania LaVie Owen; Chris Cooper
- Cinematography: Eric Hurt
- Edited by: Todd Holmes
- Music by: Jay Nash; Heath McNease; Greg LaFollette
- Production companies: Red Hat Films; River Bend Pictures
- Distributed by: Eammon Films; Samuel Goldwyn Films
- Release dates: November 4, 2015 (Austin Film Festival); October 14, 2016 (wide)
- Running time: 97 minutes
- Country: United States
- Language: English
- Box office: $18,137

Coming Through the Rye is a 2015 American coming-of-age drama film written and directed by James Steven Sadwith. It stars Alex Wolff and Stefania LaVie Owen as two teenagers who set out to find author J. D. Salinger, played by Chris Cooper. The film is based on Sadwith's own quest to find Salinger. It is Sadwith's directorial debut.

== Plot ==
In 1969, Jamie Schwartz has written a play adaptation of J.D. Salinger's 1951 novel The Catcher in the Rye and wants to produce it at his prep school in Pennsylvania. In order to do that, Jamie needs permission from Salinger himself. Therefore, Jamie, with the help of DeeDee, travels to New Hampshire in order to find Salinger and obtain his permission.

== Cast ==
- Alex Wolff as Jamie Schwartz
- Stefania Owen as DeeDee
- Chris Cooper as J. D. Salinger
- Eric Nelsen as Ted Tyler
- Randall Newsome as Alan
- Zephyr Benson as Gerry Schwartz
- Adrian Pasdar as Mr. Tierney
- Michael Siberry as Mr. Dewitt
- Kabby Borders as Maureen
- Jacob Leinbach as Hank Marcus
- Jacob Rhodes as Freddy Goreshi
- Matthew Keating as Matthew Keating

== Production ==
Sadwith says that the film is a mostly-accurate reflection of what he experienced in his real life. He explains, "The movie is about eighty-five percent accurate with what happened up to the moment when I went to search for J.D. Salinger, and from that point it’s about ninety-nine percent accurate." On November 5, 2014, it was announced that Cooper would portray Salinger in this film. On November 6, 2014, Zephyr Benson was cast in the film. The film was shot on location in and around Woodberry Forest School, and the nearby town, Orange, Virginia as well as Madison, VA. It was also filmed in the Shenandoah Valley.

== Release ==
The film made its worldwide premiere at the 2015 Austin Film Festival. The film made its wide release on October 14, 2016 by Eammon Films and Samuel Goldwyn Films.

== Reception ==
The film has a 70% rating on Rotten Tomatoes.

Barbara Van Denburgh of The Arizona Republic gave the film two and a half stars out of five.

Godfrey Cheshire of RogerEbert.com gave the film three stars.

S. Jhoanna Robledo of Common Sense Media gave the film three stars out of five.

Tricia Olszewski of TheWrap referred to the film as "a sweet and inviting road trip, taking place in the colorful fall and accompanied by an indie soundtrack that lulls. It’s also a trip back in time, offering the now-archaic sound of a typewriter’s taps and the quaintness of a period in which a man and woman had to be married to secure a motel room. The fledgling relationship between Jamie and Deedee is touching, too, with both actors giving natural if not outstanding performances."

Stephen Farber of The Hollywood Reporter wrote "Sadwith works expertly with all of the castmembers, and he also brings visual flair to the pastoral scenes in New Hampshire. Eric Hurt’s cinematography is a strong asset. Sadwith’s writing is equally perceptive."

Sheri Linden of the Los Angeles Times wrote a negative review, stating that the film "feels like standard teen angst."
