= James Steven Sadwith =

American producer, screenwriter, and director (born 1952)

- Born: October 20, 1952 (age 73); New Jersey, U.S.
- Occupations: Producer, screenwriter, director, and professor
- Years active: 1982-present
- Spouse: Nerissa Edwards Sadwith
- Children: Tyler Sadwith, Hannah Sadwith, bonus children Austin Cawley-Edwards, Sawyer Cawley-Edwards

James Steven Sadwith (born October 20, 1952) is an American producer, screenwriter, and Emmy Award-winning film director. His films have won or been nominated for over 30 Emmy and Golden Globe awards. He is best known for directing the television movie In Broad Daylight (1991), the TV series Cracker, the miniseries Sinatra (1992) and Elvis (2005), and the feature film Coming Through the Rye (2015).

In 2018, he became a film professor at the Savannah College of Art and Design.
