= Running Wilde =

American TV sitcom

- Genre: Sitcom
- Created by: Mitchell Hurwitz; Jim Vallely; Will Arnett
- Starring: Will Arnett; Keri Russell; Stefania LaVie Owen; Mel Rodriguez; Robert Michael Morris; Peter Serafinowicz; David Cross
- Narrated by: Stefania LaVie Owen
- Composer: David Schwartz
- Country of origin: United States
- Original language: English
- No. of seasons: 1
- No. of episodes: 13

Production
- Executive producers: Mitchell Hurwitz; Will Arnett; Jim Vallely; Eric Tannenbaum; Kim Tannenbaum; Paul Young; Peter Principato; Anthony Russo; Joe Russo
- Production locations: Vancouver, British Columbia, Canada
- Camera setup: Single-camera
- Running time: 30 minutes
- Production companies: Tantamount Studios; Principato-Young Entertainment; 5 Hole Pictures; Lionsgate Television

Original release
- Network: Fox (episodes 1-9); FX (episodes 10-13)
- Release: September 21, 2010 – May 21, 2011

Running Wilde is an American sitcom created by Mitchell Hurwitz, Jim Vallely and Will Arnett for Fox. It stars Arnett as Steve Wilde, a self-centered, idle bachelor and heir to an oil fortune. The series follows Wilde's awkward attempts to regain the affection of his childhood sweetheart, Emmy, an environmentalist who had been living in the South American jungle, but whose young daughter does not want to return there and who secretly enlists Steve's help to keep Emmy at his mansion, leading to farcical situations and misunderstandings.

== Background ==
Mitchell Hurwitz, Will Arnett and fellow cast member David Cross had previously worked together on Fox's Arrested Development. Running Wilde had many stylistic similarities to Arrested Development, including frequent cutaway gags and a narrator (Emmy's daughter Puddle, played by Stefania LaVie Owen) who comments on the characters' motivations. Moreover, the series appears to exist in the same universe as Arrested Development, as the fictional Bluth Company from Arrested Development is responsible for the design of the nightclub in the penultimate episode "The Pre-nup". The series provided the first U.S. network TV role for British actor-comedian Peter Serafinowicz, who plays Wilde's idle-rich friend and neighbor Fa-ad Shaoulin.

The show premiered on September 21, 2010. The show was canceled mid-season because of low ratings after just 13 episodes had been produced. The last four episodes of the series were shown on FX in late April and May 2011.

The show was shot at Sands Point Preserve, Long Island, New York. Keri Russell commuted from her home in Brooklyn, about 25 miles away, and Arnett commuted from his home in Manhattan. Production assistants searched for props at a Macy's in nearby Manhasset.

== Plot ==
The show centers on Steven Wilde, a self-centered billionaire who is clueless about the real world. He has problems with depression and often self-medicates with excessive drinking. Emmy Kadubic, Steve's high-school sweetheart, is an activist who lives in a rainforest along with her daughter Puddle and her "eco-terrorist" boyfriend Dr. Andy Weeks. Puddle refuses to speak as an attempt to force her mother to move out of the rainforest. Steve invites Emmy to a party where he is to accept an award. Intrigued that Steve may have finally become a better person, she decides to attend but discovers that his own company is giving him the award.

Liberated from the jungle, Puddle finally decides to speak and conspires with Steve to convince Emmy to stay at Steve's estate. Emmy agrees to stay for Puddle, but only in the treehouse that Steve had originally built for her when they were young. As Steve tries to win back Emmy despite Andy's interference, Emmy vows to change him into a more selfless person.

== Cast and characters ==
=== Main cast ===
- Will Arnett as Steven Wilde
- Keri Russell as Emmy Kadubic
- Robert Michael Morris as Mr. Lunt
- Mel Rodriguez as Migo Salazar
- Stefania LaVie Owen as Puddle Kadubic
- Peter Serafinowicz as Fa'ad Shaoulin
- David Cross as Dr. Andy Weeks

=== Casting ===
The first version of the pilot was filmed with Jayne Houdyshell and Joe Nunez in the roles of Robert Michael Morris and Mel Rodriguez, respectively, but when the pilot was re-shot, they were re-cast. Though neither actor appeared in the finished pilot product, they are both credited in it. Andy Daly played David Cross's part in the original pilot after the eruption of the Eyjafjallajökull volcano stopped Cross from traveling out of the United Kingdom in time for the shoot in North America; Daly, who was contracted to The Paul Reiser Show, was hired with the knowledge that he would be replaced by Cross if Running Wilde was picked up as a series.

== Episodes ==
No.	Title	Directed by	Written by	Original release date	Prod. code	U.S. viewers (millions)
1	"Pilot"	Anthony Russo & Joe Russo	Mitchell Hurwitz & Jim Vallely & Will Arnett	September 21, 2010	WLD-101	5.87
Puddle and Emmy arrive at Steve's house to protect their humanitarian cause but in Steve's attempt to win over Emmy, he ends up destroying her work instead. And Puddle helps Steve find a way to make Emmy stay.
2	"Into the Wilde"	Alex Hardcastle	Dean Lorey	September 28, 2010	WLD-103	4.47
Steve convinces Emmy to take a vacation with him, but Emmy's fiancé Andy arrives from the rainforest intent on winning her back.
3	"Oil & Water"	Troy Miller	Franklin Hardy & Shane Kosakowski	October 5, 2010	WLD-104	3.86
Emmy discovers that Steve is on the payroll at Wilde Oil and tries to get him to quit. When he goes to work for the first time ever, Steve discovers that he may actually like it. Emmy goes overboard with her plan to stop Wilde Oil. Steve and Emmy try to help Puddle with a science project.
4	"The Junior Affair"	Jeff Melman	Franklin Hardy & Shane Kosakowski	October 12, 2010	WLD-105	3.28
Emmy decides to get involved in Puddle's love life when she finds her daughter facing the same problem that she did with Steve at Puddle's age. Steve decides to impress Emmy by standing up to the boy's father the way he never did to his own father, but ends up impressing the father in a very unintended way instead.
5	"The Party"	Troy Miller	Mitchell Hurwitz & Jim Vallely	October 19, 2010	WLD-102	2.92
Steve and Emmy team up to throw a cheap, environmentally friendly soiree. Fa'ad tries to outdo Steve and Steve tries to pretend that the party is ironic while Emmy tries to prove that she is fun.
6	"Best Man"	Scott Ellis	Richard Day & Mitchell Hurwitz	November 9, 2010	WLD-107	2.83
Steve's feelings for Emmy prompt him to offer to host hers and Andy's wedding because he wants her to be happy. Steve plans an elaborate Renaissance-themed wedding, only to realize that he forgot to invite Andy.
7	"Mental Flaws"	John Fortenberry	Mark Driscoll	November 30, 2010	WLD-106	3.36
Steve wants to bring Emmy to a charity gala, but Emmy worries that Steve is only concerned with appearances.
8	"It's a Trade Off"	John Fortenberry	Gina Gold & Aururae Khoo	December 7, 2010	WLD-108	4.07
Steve and Emmy trade roles. Steve takes care of Puddle and helps her with her schoolwork, and Emmy lives Steve's life of parties and social events in an attempt to prove that she can maintain her integrity while being on the "A List".
9	"One Forward Step"	Scott Ellis	Franklin Hardy & Shane Kosakowski	December 26, 2010	WLD-109	3.00
Steve's stepmother comes to cut off Steve's money, just when Steve is trying to give Emmy money for a charity that she had made up.
10	"Jack's Back"	John Fortenberry	Jim Vallely	April 28, 2011 (FX)	WLD-110	0.45
An old friend (Rob Corddry) of Steve and Fa'ad returns to their lives as a reformed man. But Emmy, mistaking Steve's intentions, assumes Jack is faking it for her benefit, and sets about pretending to seduce him, leading Steve in turn to mistake her intentions.
11	"Alienated"	Adam Bernstein	Christine Zander	May 6, 2011 (FX)	WLD-111	N/A
Emmy forces Steve to give Migo a holiday, and then convinces him to join her at a protest supporting immigrants' rights. While Migo follows his passion, Steve takes out his anger at the separation by joining the opposing team - the 'rich white men' opposing immigration.
12	"The Pre-Nup"	Troy Miller	Richard Day	May 14, 2011 (FX)	WLD-112	N/A
While Steve and Fa'ad begin plans to develop a nightclub on the site of a recent flood disaster, a jealous Mr. Lunt convinces Emmy to sign a prenuptial agreement stating that she would not take Steve's money in the unlikely event that the pair get married, leading to a chain of mistaken impressions.
13	"Basket Cases"	Mitchell Hurwitz	Jim Vallely & Mitchell Hurwitz	May 21, 2011 (FX)	WLD-113	N/A
Wilde Oil causes an ecological disaster and Steve's father (Jeffrey Tambor) puts Emmy in charge of the cleanup. Eventually, Steve finds out that it's a plot to get Emmy away from him, and he joins her.

== Cancellation ==
The show was pulled from November sweeps and on November 30, 2010, Fox announced that no new episodes would be ordered. Although the five remaining episodes were to air through December, Fox postponed two of them to air at the end of the month. At the 2011 Television Critics Association tour, Fox announced that the show was officially canceled. The remaining episodes were aired starting April 28, 2011 on FX.
