= Cracker (American TV series) =

1997 crime drama set in Los Angeles

- Cracker – The Complete American series
- Based on: Cracker by Jimmy McGovern
- Developed by: James Steven Sadwith
- Starring: Robert Pastorelli; Carolyn McCormick; Josh Hartnett; Angela Featherstone; R. Lee Ermey
- Composer: Roy Hay
- Country of origin: United States
- Original language: English
- No. of seasons: 1
- No. of episodes: 16 (5 unaired)

Production
- Executive producers: Donald Kushner; Scott M. Siegler; Rob Dwek; Gub Neal; James Steven Sadwith
- Producer: Natalie Chaidez
- Running time: 60 minutes
- Production companies: Sadwith Productions; Granada Entertainment; The Kushner-Locke Company

Original release
- Network: ABC
- Release: September 18, 1997 – January 24, 1998

Cracker is an American crime drama series based on the British television crime drama of the same name created by Jimmy McGovern. It stars Robert Pastorelli as criminal psychologist Gerry 'Fitz' Fitzgerald, and Josh Hartnett in his first television role, appearing in several episodes playing Fitz's eldest son. Robbie Coltrane, the star of the original series, appears as a villain in one episode.

An "innovative but disturbing" take on the standard police-detective genre, the Americanized Cracker consists of sixteen one-hour episodes set in Los Angeles and was produced by Granada Entertainment. It ran on ABC from September 18, 1997, until January 24, 1998. The remade show was broadcast as Fitz in some countries, including the United Kingdom.

The series focuses on a professional psychologist who assists the Los Angeles Police Department due to his unique ability in understanding the psychology of criminals. But this understanding is based largely on this troubled man having similar inner demons and addictions to the criminals which he is investigating.

== Overview ==
Gerry "Fitz" Fitzgerald is an unconventional but brilliant psychologist. To pay the bills, he gives lectures at colleges, has a small practice in a mini-mall, and has his own radio show. He also helps the Los Angeles Police Department solve difficult cases. These give him ability to get inside the criminal mind. But that is only true when he does not have to deal with his own inner demons, which include drinking, gambling, extramarital affairs, and a tense relationship with his wife Judith and his 17-year-old son Michael.

== Cast and characters ==
=== Main ===
- Robert Pastorelli as Gerry 'Fitz' Fitzgerald
- Angela Featherstone as Detective Hannah Tyler
- Carolyn McCormick as Judith Fitzgerald
- Robert Wisdom as Detective Danny Watlington
- Josh Hartnett as Michael Fitzgerald
- R. Lee Ermey as Lieutenant Fry

=== Recurring ===
- Scott Sowers as Detective Allen Parker
- Paul Perri as Waldron
- Sally Levi (as Sally Livingstone) as Hope Fitzgerald
- Josh Lucas as Lieutenant Macy

=== Special guest appearances ===
- Robbie Coltrane as David Roberge
- Mariska Hargitay as Detective Penny Hatfield
- Sarah Paulson as Janice
- John DiMaggio as Simon
- Lorraine Toussaint as Tisha Watlington
- Adewale Akinnuoye-Agbaje as John Doe
- Peter Sarsgaard as Spencer Trent
- Lee Tergesen as Dan Green
- Carlos Jacott as Jim
- Amber Benson as Amy
- Peter Firth as Mitchell Grady

== Production ==
Alternate titles considered for the series were Cracker: Mind Over Murder and Fitz.

== Episodes ==
No.	Title	Directed by	Written by	Original release date	Prod. code
1	"True Romance: Part 1"	James Steven Sadwith	Paul Abbott (British episode: "True Romance"); James Sadwith	September 18, 1997	101
Gerry "Fitz" Fitzgerald is an alcoholic, self-hating psychologist and compulsive gambler who lectures at local community colleges and hosts a radio-call in show, while assisting the Los Angeles police department in various crimes. Fitz is asked to help track down a female serial killer of men who writes him love notes, claiming to be in love with Fitz. With the clock ticking and minimal evidence to move the investigation along, Fitz must find a way to locate the killer before she strikes again. On a personal front, Fitz is also having problems at home: Judith, his wife and a feminist author, is on the verge of throwing in the towel on their marriage despite their newborn baby. Michael, Fitz's 17-year-old son, finds it extremely difficult to relate to his equally troubled father. Michael becomes the next target for attack by the serial killer, Janice, who claims to be in love with Fitz and he must race against the clock to find the killer before Michael becomes Janice's latest victim.
2	"True Romance: Part 2"	Whitney Ransick	Paul Abbott (British episode: "True Romance"); James Sadwith	September 25, 1997	102
Gerry "Fitz" Fitzgerald is an alcoholic, self-hating psychologist and compulsive gambler who lectures at local community colleges and hosts a radio-call in show, while assisting the Los Angeles police department in various crimes. Fitz is asked to help track down a female serial killer of men who writes him love notes, claiming to be in love with Fitz. With the clock ticking and minimal evidence to move the investigation along, Fitz must find a way to locate the killer before she strikes again. On a personal front, Fitz is also having problems at home: Judith, his wife and a feminist author, is on the verge of throwing in the towel on their marriage despite their newborn baby. Michael, Fitz's 17-year-old son, finds it extremely difficult to relate to his equally troubled father. Michael becomes the next target for attack by the serial killer, Janice, who claims to be in love with Fitz and he must race against the clock to find the killer before Michael becomes Janice's latest victim.
3	"Madwoman"	John D. Hancock	Jimmy McGovern (British episode: "The Mad Woman in the Attic"); Jim Leonard, Jnr.	October 2, 1997	104
When an amnesia victim, covered in blood, is found near the scene of a brutal murder aboard a moving train, the police are convinced they have their killer and bring Fitz in to get a confession. Fitz, however, is less convinced of the suspect's guilt, and takes it upon himself to help the man, the 'John Doe' recover his memory while he searches for the real killer. Meanwhile, at Judith's insistence, Fitz attends a Gamblers Anonymous meeting, which culminates in Fitz leading the members in a betting frenzy.
4	"Lemmings Will Fly"	Stephen Cragg	Jimmy McGovern (British episode: "One Day a Lemming Will Fly"); Jim Leonard, Jnr.	October 9, 1997	105
When a teacher is suspected of killing a young male student, Fitz' mesmerizing interrogation leads to a startling conclusion that the teacher, Mr. Quint, is gay and was trying to seduce the student. Meanwhile, Fitz considers a getaway proposition from Detective Hannah Tyler after discovering that Judith is dating their marriage counselor Garson Shepherd.
5	"Hell Hath No Fury"	Ian Toynton	Natalie Chaidez	October 16, 1997	106
When a newborn baby goes missing from a local hospital, Fitz becomes convinced that the kidnapper is a woman, regardless of the eyewitnesses and videotape evidence. But the truth ends up being more surprising than any wild suspicions following the apprehension of a female suspect, a maternity nurse, because the real abductor is her transvestite brother. Meanwhile, Fitz and Michael are in bitter disagreement over Michael's ex-girlfriend and her re-appearance into their lives. Also, Fitz attempts to communicate with his wife Judith, which ends up being a mistake.
6	"'Tis Pity She's a Whore"	Michael Fields	Jimmy McGovern (British episode: "To Say I Love You"); Jim Leonard, Jnr.	October 23, 1997	103
Fitz joins forces with the Los Angeles Police Department as they track a severely disturbed young couple, a junkie named Tina, and a stuttering mentally disturbed man named Sean, who have fallen in love with each other while on a murderous rampage. Meanwhile, Judith rejects Fitz' latest plea to move back home after discovering that he continues to suffer from his gambling addiction and refuses to seek professional help.
7	"Sons and Lovers"	Kenneth Fink	Barry Pullman & James Sadwith	November 6, 1997	107
When a teenage boy is accused of murdering his promiscuous mother, Fitz retraces the victim's final hours, determined to find another explanation for the vicious crime despite opposition from his grumpy boss, Lt. Fry, who thinks that the teenager is guilty. Meanwhile, Fitz's family bonding efforts at Sunday dinner blow up in his face due to his jealousy over Judith, his lacklustre efforts to bond with his son Michael and daughter Hope, and Judith's overprotective mother.
8	"Talk to Me"	Tucker Gates	Steven Dietz	November 13, 1997	108
When Colleen McBeal, a controversial radio personality, is being stalked by one of her listeners, Fitz's investigation yields shocking and deadly results when it's revealed that Colleen and her manager Jeffrey have faked the stalking for publicity ratings, and then Jeffrey is murdered by a real stalker/listener. Meanwhile, Fitz discovers that Judith has plans to spend a romantic evening with their marriage counselor, Garson Shepherd, so he retaliates by taking Tyler out to the same restaurant just to make Judith angry and jealous.
9	"An American Dream"	Ian Toynton	Jimmy McGovern (British episode: "To Be a Somebody"); James Sadwith and Barry Pullman	December 11, 1997	109
When a famous porn star/stripper, named Dee Dee Wilder, is found murdered in her house, Fitz and the police investigate. At first, the evidence seems to indicate that her possessive manager is involved, until circumstances soon point to the young lady's estranged father. Meanwhile, Fitz has a heart attack, which brings Judith back for a temporary reconciliation, while his daughter Hope tries to persuade him to change his lifestyle.
10	"If: Part 1"	Perry Lang	Natalie Chaidez & Jim Leonard, Jr.	January 17, 1998	110
Fitz assists the police in tracking down a serial sniper whose killings of four African-American woman have all the ear markings of being revenge killings. Following a clue in the number of bullet hits on the bodies, Fitz determines the sniper to be motivated by the L.A. riots in 1992. However, the sniper is actually a distraught man who is motivated by the condition of his wife, who is severely injured and comatose. During this, Tyler begins dating a handsome K-9 cop, named Dale, while Watlington deals with Lt. Fry's handling of the case as well as his ex-wife Tisha's decision to re-marry a younger man who is an ex-con. Meanwhile, Judith asks Fitz to watch over their newborn son while she has a job interview, and she admits to being unfaithful to Fitz with their marriage councilor. Fitz and the police are startled to discover that the next target for the sniper is someone they all have a relationship with: Watlington's ex-wife Tisha whose boyfriend, Ronnie Brooks, was involved in the incident that put John Ramon's wife in a coma during the 1992 race riots. The situation develops with Ramos taking Tisha hostage at the hospital, leading to a standoff between him and Fitz in Ramos' wife's room. Meanwhile, Judith's admission of her betrayal somehow brings both herself and Fitz together again over their newborn son.
11	"If: Part 2"	Perry Lang	Natalie Chaidez & Jim Leonard, Jr.	January 24, 1998	111
Fitz assists the police in tracking down a serial sniper whose killings of four African-American woman have all the ear markings of being revenge killings. Following a clue in the number of bullet hits on the bodies, Fitz determines the sniper to be motivated by the L.A. riots in 1992. However, the sniper is actually a distraught man who is motivated by the condition of his wife, who is severely injured and comatose. During this, Tyler begins dating a handsome K-9 cop, named Dale, while Watlington deals with Lt. Fry's handling of the case as well as his ex-wife Tisha's decision to re-marry a younger man who is an ex-con. Meanwhile, Judith asks Fitz to watch over their newborn son while she has a job interview, and she admits to being unfaithful to Fitz with their marriage councilor. Fitz and the police are startled to discover that the next target for the sniper is someone they all have a relationship with: Watlington's ex-wife Tisha whose boyfriend, Ronnie Brooks, was involved in the incident that put John Ramon's wife in a coma during the 1992 race riots. The situation develops with Ramos taking Tisha hostage at the hospital, leading to a standoff between him and Fitz in Ramos' wife's room. Meanwhile, Judith's admission of her betrayal somehow brings both herself and Fitz together again over their newborn son.
12	"The Club"	Stephen Cragg	Emily Whitesell	February 26, 1999	112
When a wealthy teenage girl is found murdered at a local rave, Fitz investigates and discovers that her friends are a clique of wealthy and spoiled teens who have formed a sex club, and the list of suspects is soon narrowed down to the murdered girl's boyfriend, Spencer, whose older brother died from AIDS years earlier. Meanwhile, Fitz and Judith deal with Hope, who has gotten into trouble at school over her own activities involving carousing for boys.
13	"Best Boys"	John D. Hancock	Paul Abbott (British episode: "Best Boys"); Jim Leonard, Jnr.	March 5, 1999	113
Fitz and the police investigate the brutal murder of a nosy landlady and a social worker in which evidence points to a troubled juvenile delinquent and his factory worker boss who have formed an "unnatural" association and are killing people they see as keeping them apart from each other. This leads to a standoff between the youth and his former stepmother which Fitz tries to diffuse. Meanwhile, Tyler announces her engagement to Dale while Lt. Fry announces his promotion to chief detective, while Fitz's home life gets worse when Judith becomes jealous about all the time he's spending around Tyler and the other detectives.
14	"Faustian Fitz"	Joe Ann Fogle	John Steppling & James Steven Sadwith	March 12, 1999	114
Fitz is hired by David Roberge, a famous child actor-turned-Hollywood studio mogul, to help clear his name when a teenage model is found murdered on the grounds of Roberge's Hollywood mansion, leading to conflicts with Fitz's former employer Lt. Macy and the other detectives on the police force, all of whom are still reeling from the shock of Hannah Tyler's murder. On the home front, Fitz doesn't welcome a visit from his estranged father Emory, while Judith, Michael and Hope have mixed feelings about Mr. Fitzgerald's presence in their household. NB: Despite being first broadcast before First Love the episode is set after the final two episodes.
15	"First Love: Part 1"	Stephen Cragg	Paul Abbott	May 2, 1999	115
Fitz assists the police and the new commanding officer, the younger and better educated - but less experienced - Lt. Monroe Macey, Lt. Fry's replacement, in tracking a serial killer of three women when a police officer becomes a victim. Suspicion falls on the officer's partner, Pete Renaldi, who holds a clue to the killer's identity which prompts Tyler to go undercover to romance Renaldi in order to look for clues. Meanwhile, on Fitz's home front, Judith becomes nervous when she thinks that she might be pregnant again while Michael wants a car as he's turned 18. When Detective Hannah Tyler is abducted by the killer, who is Officer Palmer's deranged wife Linda who's jealous over Pete Renauldi's attraction to Tyler, Fitz, Lt. Macy, Parker, and Watlington interrogate Officer Renauldi's over a connection to the murders. When red tape prevents them from making headway, Fitz takes it upon himself to interrogate Renauldi himself to find out the identity of the killer he's protecting. He delves into the dirty officer's past and his connection with Linda Palmer, unaware that she has by this time shot and killed Tyler after she made a half-baked attempt to escape. Linda then decides to settle the score with Renauldi herself.
16	"First Love: Part 2"	Stephen Cragg	Paul Abbott	May 2, 1999	116
Fitz assists the police and the new commanding officer, the younger and better educated - but less experienced - Lt. Monroe Macey, Lt. Fry's replacement, in tracking a serial killer of three women when a police officer becomes a victim. Suspicion falls on the officer's partner, Pete Renaldi, who holds a clue to the killer's identity which prompts Tyler to go undercover to romance Renaldi in order to look for clues. Meanwhile, on Fitz's home front, Judith becomes nervous when she thinks that she might be pregnant again while Michael wants a car as he's turned 18. When Detective Hannah Tyler is abducted by the killer, who is Officer Palmer's deranged wife Linda who's jealous over Pete Renauldi's attraction to Tyler, Fitz, Lt. Macy, Parker, and Watlington interrogate Officer Renauldi's over a connection to the murders. When red tape prevents them from making headway, Fitz takes it upon himself to interrogate Renauldi himself to find out the identity of the killer he's protecting. He delves into the dirty officer's past and his connection with Linda Palmer, unaware that she has by this time shot and killed Tyler after she made a half-baked attempt to escape. Linda then decides to settle the score with Renauldi herself.
