= Medeas =

- Film poster
- Directed by: Andrea Pallaoro
- Written by: Andrea Pallaoro; Orlando Tirado
- Produced by: Eleonora Granata-Jenkinson; Kyle Heller; Gina Resnick; Jonathan Venguer
- Starring: Catalina Sandino Moreno; Brían F. O'Byrne; Kevin Alejandro; Ian Nelson; Mary Mouser; Maxim Knight; Jake Vaughn
- Cinematography: Chayse Irvin
- Edited by: Isaac Hagy; Arndt Peemoeller
- Distributed by: The Vladar Company
- Release date: September 2, 2013 (Venice)
- Running time: 97 minutes
- Countries: United States; Italy; Mexico
- Language: English

Medeas is a 2013 drama film co-written and directed by Andrea Pallaoro, in his directorial debut. An American-Italian-Mexican co-production, it stars Catalina Sandino Moreno and Brían F. O'Byrne.

== Plot ==
MEDEAS is an intimate portrait of a rural family’s inner lives and their relationship to a harsh and shifting landscape. Ennis, a stern, hard-working dairy farmer struggles to maintain control of his family and surrounding environment, while his wife, Christina, retreats into herself, progressively disconnecting from him and their five children. As tensions increase, each character must confront their yearnings and anxieties, culminating in a dangerous conflict between control and freedom, intimacy, and alienation. A journey into the unpredictable boundaries of human behavior, MEDEAS explores the desperate lengths people are driven to by love and self-preservation.

== Cast ==
- Catalina Sandino Moreno as Christina
- Brían F. O'Byrne as Ennis
- Mary Mouser as Ruth
- Ian Nelson as Micah
- Maxim Knight as Jacob
- Jake Vaughn as Jonas
- Kevin Alejandro as Noah
- Patrick Birkett as Tobias
- Angel Amaral as Adam
- Tara Buck as Ada
- Granville Ames as Carl

== Reception ==
The film has an 80% approval rating on Rotten Tomatoes based on 10 reviews, with an average score of 6.71/10. Nick Prigge of Slant Magazine gave the film three stars out of four. Orlando Weekly gave it four stars out of five. Glenn Kenny of RogerEbert.com gave it two stars.

== See also ==
- List of films featuring the deaf and hard of hearing
