= Robert Michael Morris =

American actor

- Born: May 6, 1940; Kentucky, U.S.
- Died: May 30, 2017 (aged 77)
- Occupation: Actor
- Known for: The Comeback

Robert Michael Morris (May 6, 1940 – May 30, 2017) was an American actor. He was known for his co-starring role as Mickey Deane in the reality television spoof The Comeback and as Mr. Lunt in the short-lived series Running Wilde. He also wrote over 100 plays.

== Biography ==
Born in Kentucky, Morris obtained a Bachelor of Arts in English and art from the University of Dayton, as well as a Master of Fine Arts in playwriting from the Catholic University of America. He taught both high school and college theater before becoming a professional actor relatively late in life and relocating to New York City. "I moved to New York so I could find out what it was like to be a professional actor because my students were all asking questions and all I had was academic knowledge. I didn't have any real professional knowledge." Michael Patrick King, one of Morris's students, and Lisa Kudrow wrote his role in The Comeback with him in mind; King asked him to audition.

Morris also had notable guest appearances in such series as Will & Grace, How I Met Your Mother, Better Things and 2 Broke Girls. The Season 2 episode of Better Things entitled "Eulogy" features a pre-credits on screen dedication to his memory. It was his last filmed role.

Morris died on May 30, 2017, at age 77.
