= Eve Lindley =

American actress (born 1993)

- Born: 1992 or 1993 (age 33–34)
- Occupation: Actress
- Years active: 2016–present

Eve Lindley (born 1992 or 1993) is an American actress. She is best known for her roles in the television series Dispatches from Elsewhere and the film All We Had. In 2016, she was named in Out magazine's OUT100. As a model she has worked with Barneys New York.

== Biography ==
Lindley has two older sisters. Her parents divorced when she was two years old, and were granted joint custody. By the time she was in seventh grade, she lived full-time with her father. Lindley is a trans woman; she started transitioning in high school with her father's support.

Before making her film debut in All We Had at the 2016 Tribeca Film Festival, Lindley worked in costumemaking, sales, and as a barista and dog-walker, among other jobs. She is best known for her role in the AMC series Dispatches from Elsewhere as Simone, starring alongside Jason Segel, Sally Field, and Andre Benjamin.

== Filmography ==
=== Film ===
Year	Title	Role	Notes
2016	All We Had	Pam	Supporting role; feature film debut
2017	Linda & the Worm	Tiffany	
2018	A Kid Like Jake	Waiter #1	
2018	Happy Birthday, Marsha!	Sylvia Rivera	Short film
2019	Extra Toppings	Taylor	Short film
2019	Welcome Back, Lenny	Lenny	Short film
2019	Otherhood	Girl	
2021	After Yang	Faye	
2022	Bros	Tamara	
2023	National Anthem	Sky	
2025	Queens of the Dead	Jane	

=== Television ===
Year	Title	Role	Notes
2016	Mr. Robot	Hot Carla	4 episodes
2016	Fishkill	Justine	TV movie
2016–2017	Outsiders	Frida	8 episodes
2017	High Maintenance		Episode: "Namaste"
2019	Tales of the City	Lily	Episode: "Days of Small Surrenders"
2020	Dispatches from Elsewhere	Simone	Main role
2024	Arcane	Lest (voice)	2 episodes

=== Theater ===
Year	Title	Role	Notes
2016	Street Children	Jamie	Off-Broadway show, Lead
