= Stefania LaVie Owen =

American-New Zealand actress (born 1997)

- Born: December 15, 1997 (age 28); Miami, Florida, U.S.
- Occupation: Actress
- Years active: 2009–present

Stefania LaVie Owen is a New Zealand-American actress. She portrayed Puddle Kadubic in the comedy television series Running Wilde and Dorrit Bradshaw in the teen drama television series The Carrie Diaries. She starred as Melanie in the film Paper Spiders, as Bear in the Netflix show Sweet Tooth, and as Nicole Chance in the Hulu original psychological thriller Chance. She earned a Children's and Family Emmy Award nomination for her role in the third season of Sweet Tooth.

== Early life ==
Owen was born in Miami, Florida, to an American mother and a New Zealand father. Her mother is of Cuban descent. Owen moved to New Zealand at age four, settling in Pauatahanui, a village 30 km (19 mi) north of the capital city Wellington.

Owen lives between New York City and Wellington. She attended Pauatahanui school, where she won the cup for performing arts, and which helped begin her career in acting. She also attended Chilton Saint James School, an all-girls private school, in Lower Hutt, Wellington. Her sisters Lolo and Carly accompanied her there, and she was involved in many school productions and dancing classes.

== Career ==
Owen made her acting debut in the 2009 Peter Jackson film The Lovely Bones, playing Flora Hernandez. From 2010 to 2011, she played the character Puddle Kadubic in the Fox comedy series Running Wilde. Owen co-starred as Dorrit, Carrie Bradshaw's rebellious younger sister, in The CW's The Carrie Diaries, which aired in 2013 and 2014.

She had a role in the 2015 comedy horror film, Krampus, directed by Michael Dougherty. She also portrayed Deedee in the drama film Coming Through the Rye. She starred opposite Lili Taylor in the drama Paper Spiders. She also co-starred in Messiah as Rebecca in 2020.

== Filmography ==
Film and television roles
Year	Title	Role	Notes
2009	The Lovely Bones	Flora Hernandez	Film
2010–2011	Running Wilde	Puddle Kadubic	Main role
2011	Home Game	Charlotte	Unsold television pilot
2013–2014	The Carrie Diaries	Dorrit Bradshaw	Main role
2015	Krampus	Beth Engel	Film
2015	Coming Through the Rye	Deedee	Film
2016	All We Had	Ruthie Carmichael	Film
2016–2017	Chance	Nicole Chance	Main role
2018	I'm Dying Up Here	Amanda "Mandy" Robbins	Recurring role
2019	The Cat and the Moon	Eliza	Film
2019	The Beach Bum	Heather	Film
2020	Messiah	Rebecca Iguero	Main cast
2020	The Wilds	Becca Gilroy	Episode: "Day Sixteen"
2021	Paper Spiders	Melanie	Film
2021–2024	Sweet Tooth	Bear	Main role
2022	Don't Make Me Go	Sandra	

== Awards and nominations ==
Year	Organisation	Category	Project	Result	Ref.
2025	Children's and Family Emmy Awards	Outstanding Supporting Performer in a Preschool, Children's or Young Teen Program	Sweet Tooth	Nominated	
