= Upcycling =

Recycling waste into products of higher quality

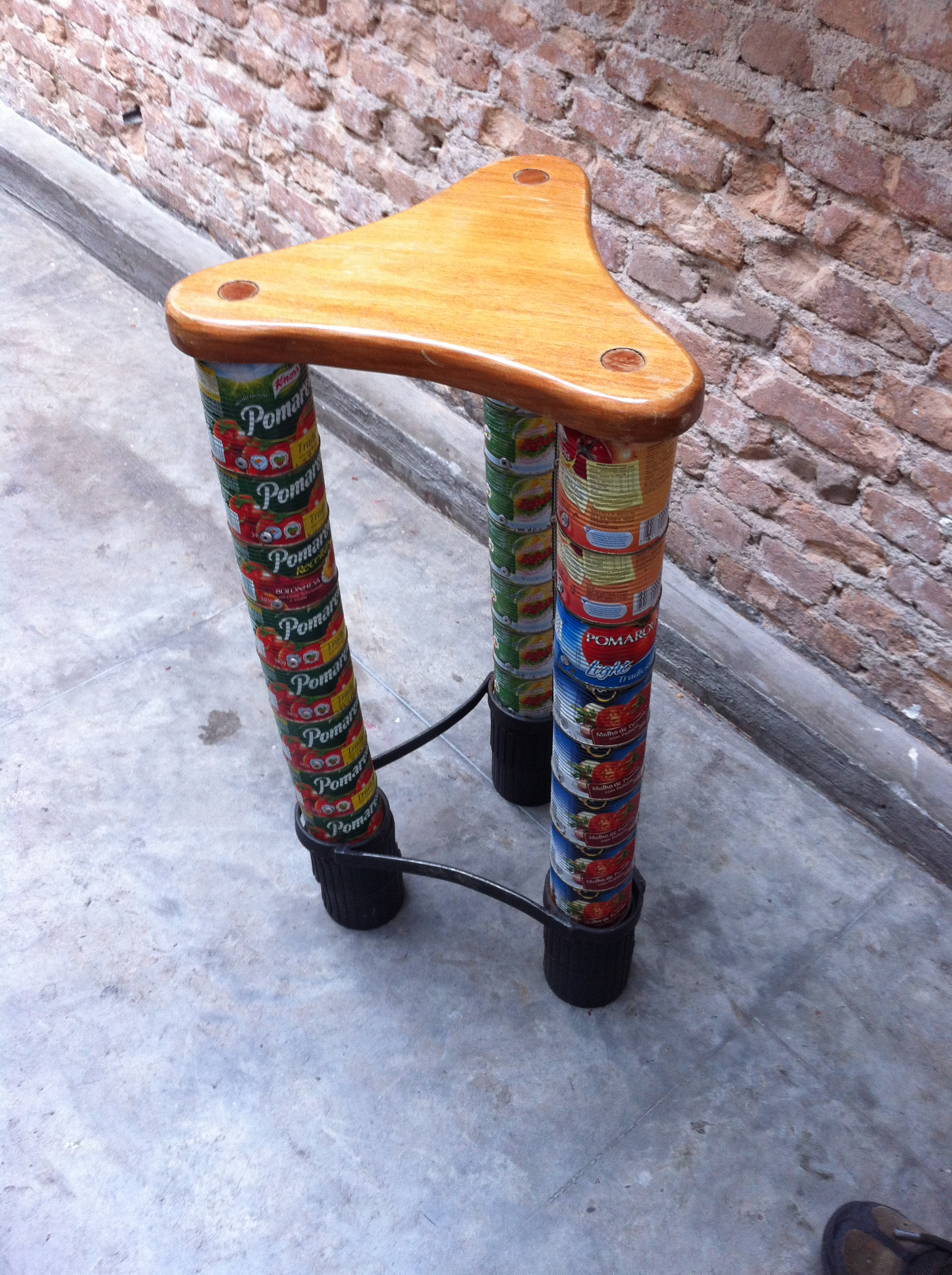
Food cans upcycled into a stool

Upcycling, also known as creative reuse, is the process of transforming by-products, waste materials, useless, or unwanted products into new materials or products perceived to be of greater quality, such as artistic value or environmental value.

Upcycling is a subset of the recycling process. Recycling typically involves remaking items back into their original design. Upcycling is a process that instead adds value to a newly created product. Downcycling, however, is an opposing recycling process that degrades waste materials into new products of lower quality. Both processes of recycling help reduce landfill waste.

Applications of upcycling include art, music, fashion, food, and technology.

== History ==
Prior to the Industrial Revolution, upcycling was a common practice used to repair goods. The person repairing the goods and the person using the goods was usually the same person. Writer Alvin Toffler coined the term "prosumer" to describe the role of the producer and consumer as a single entity. In the Western world, however, the increased production capabilities that came with the industrial revolution of the 18th and 19th centuries resulted in a separation of these roles. A linear economic model emerged that encouraged used products to be thrown away and replaced by newly produced ones. This rise in consumerism resulted in a decrease of the pre-industrial upcycling practices. In the 21st century, an increased understanding of the economic and environmental benefits of upcycling has contributed to the revival of DIY repair.

=== History of the term "upcycling" ===
Upsizing was the title of the German edition of a book about upcycling, first published in English in 1998 by Gunter Pauli and given the revised title of Upcycling in 1999. The German edition was adapted to the German language and culture by Johannes F. Hartkemeyer, then Director of the Volkshochschule in Osnabrück. The concept was later incorporated by William McDonough and Michael Braungart in their 2002 book Cradle to Cradle: Remaking the Way We Make Things. They state that the goal of upcycling is to prevent wasting potentially useful materials by making use of existing ones. This reduces the consumption of new raw materials when creating new products. Reducing the use of new raw materials can result in a reduction of energy usage, air pollution, water pollution and even greenhouse gas emissions.

Upcycling has shown significant growth across the United States. For example, the number of products on Etsy, Pinterest, and Upcycle Studio tagged with the word "upcycled" increased from about 7,900 in January 2010 to nearly 30,000 a year later. As of April 2013, that number stood at 263,685.

=== Global context ===
In 2009, Belinda Smith from Reuters wrote that upcycling had increased in rich countries but observed that upcycling was a necessity in poorer ones. While developing countries' practice of upcycling used goods reflects a lack of access to buy new goods, in developed countries it reflects a greater importance assigned to environmentally friendly practices. Consumers are also motivated by cheaper prices to upcycle. If more companies recognize the profitability of upcycled products, then it can become a more mainstream practice in the corporate world.

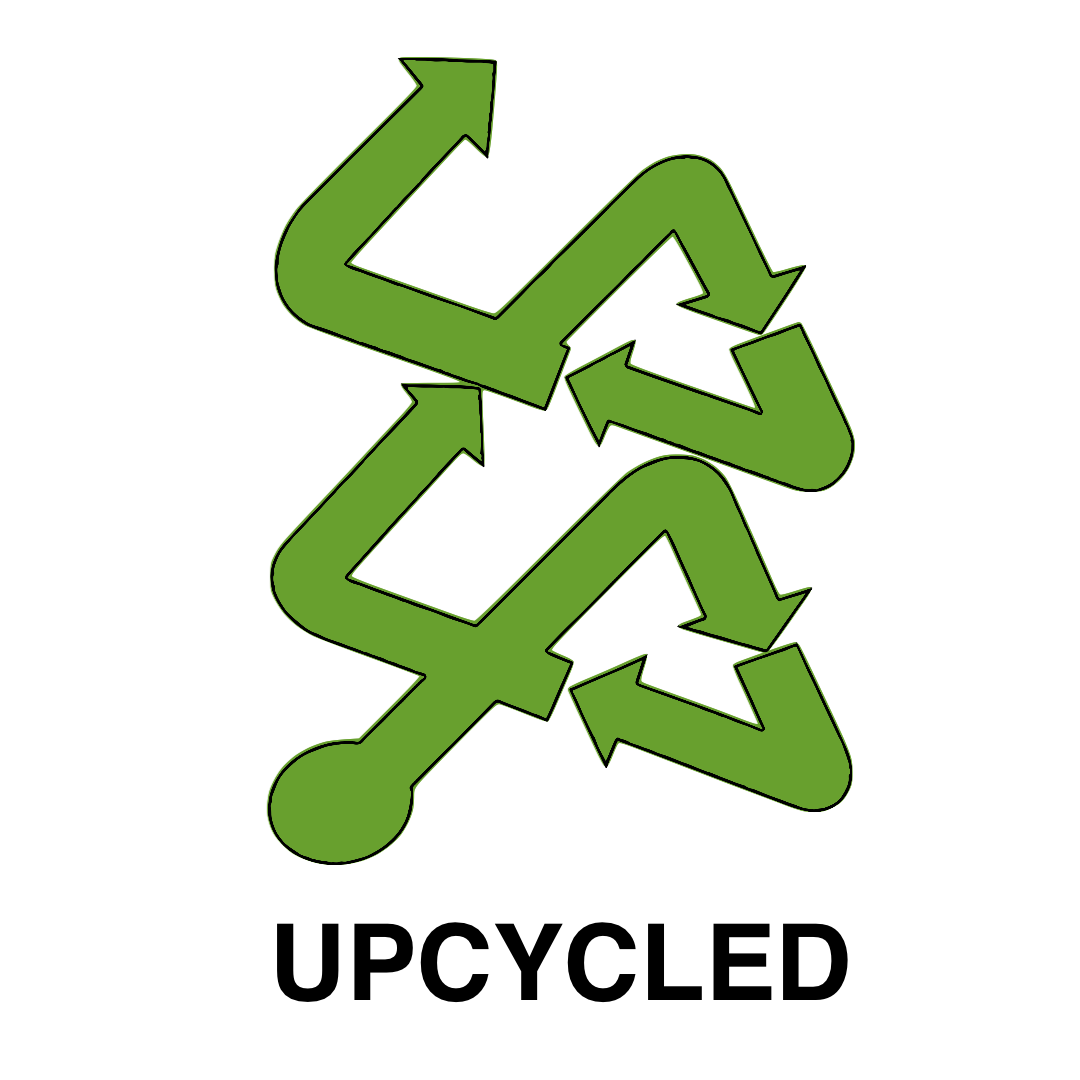
Upcycling visual representation (non-official) Norberto Miranda (2025).

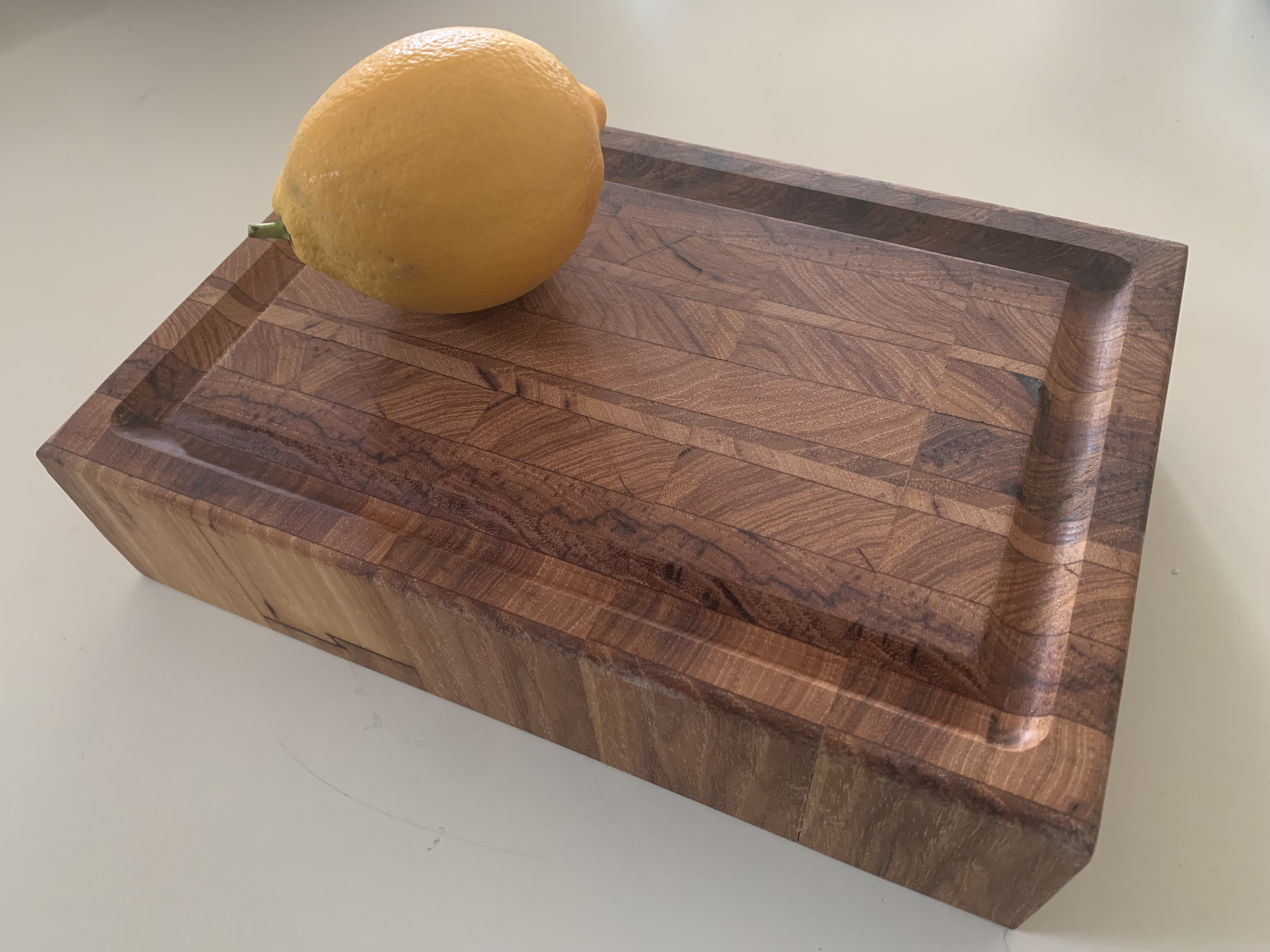
This upcycled cutting board was made from boxcar floorboards that were taken from a railroad salvage yard.

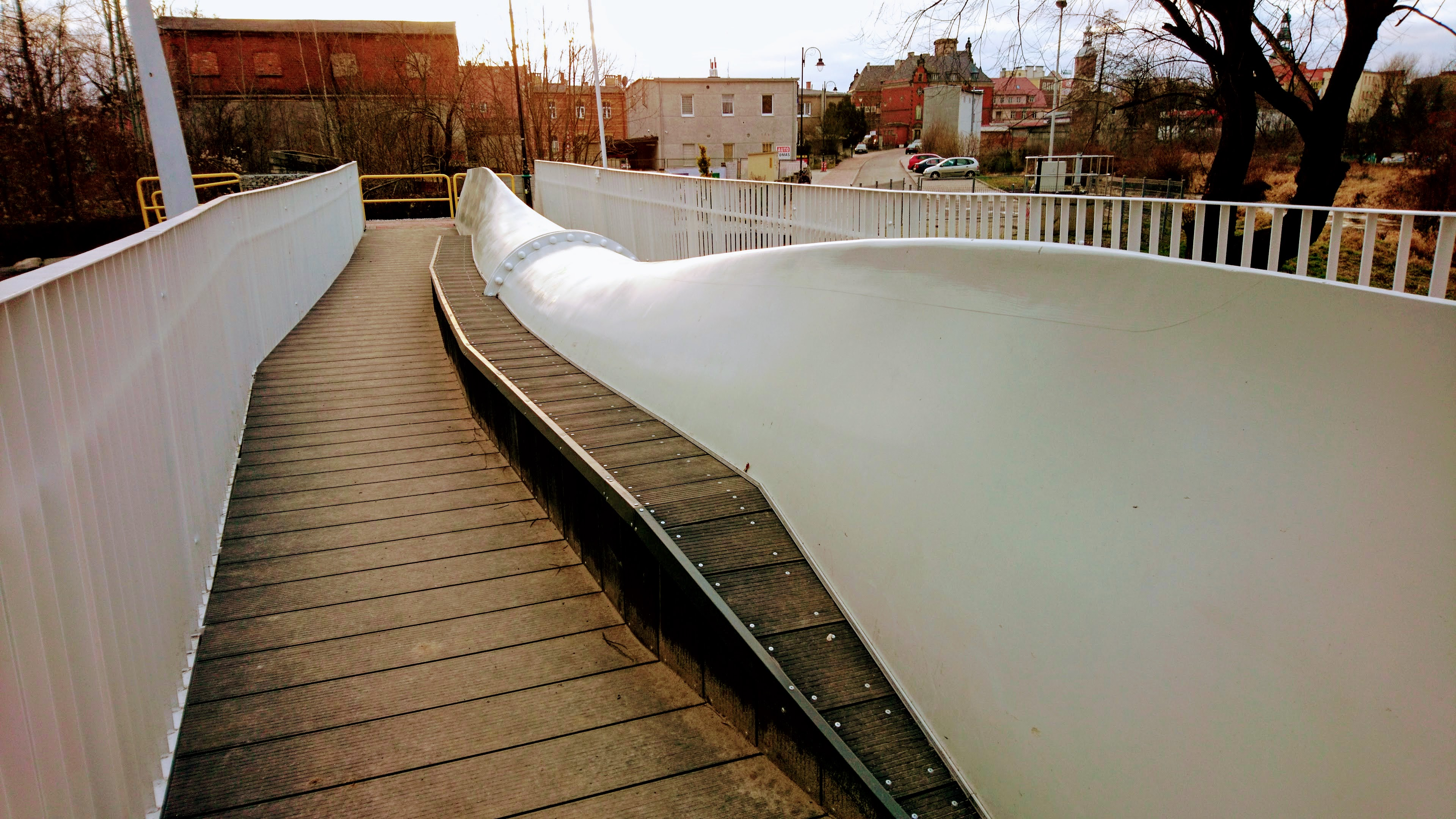
Footbridge supported on a former wind turbine blade in Szprotawa

== Recycling and upcycling ==
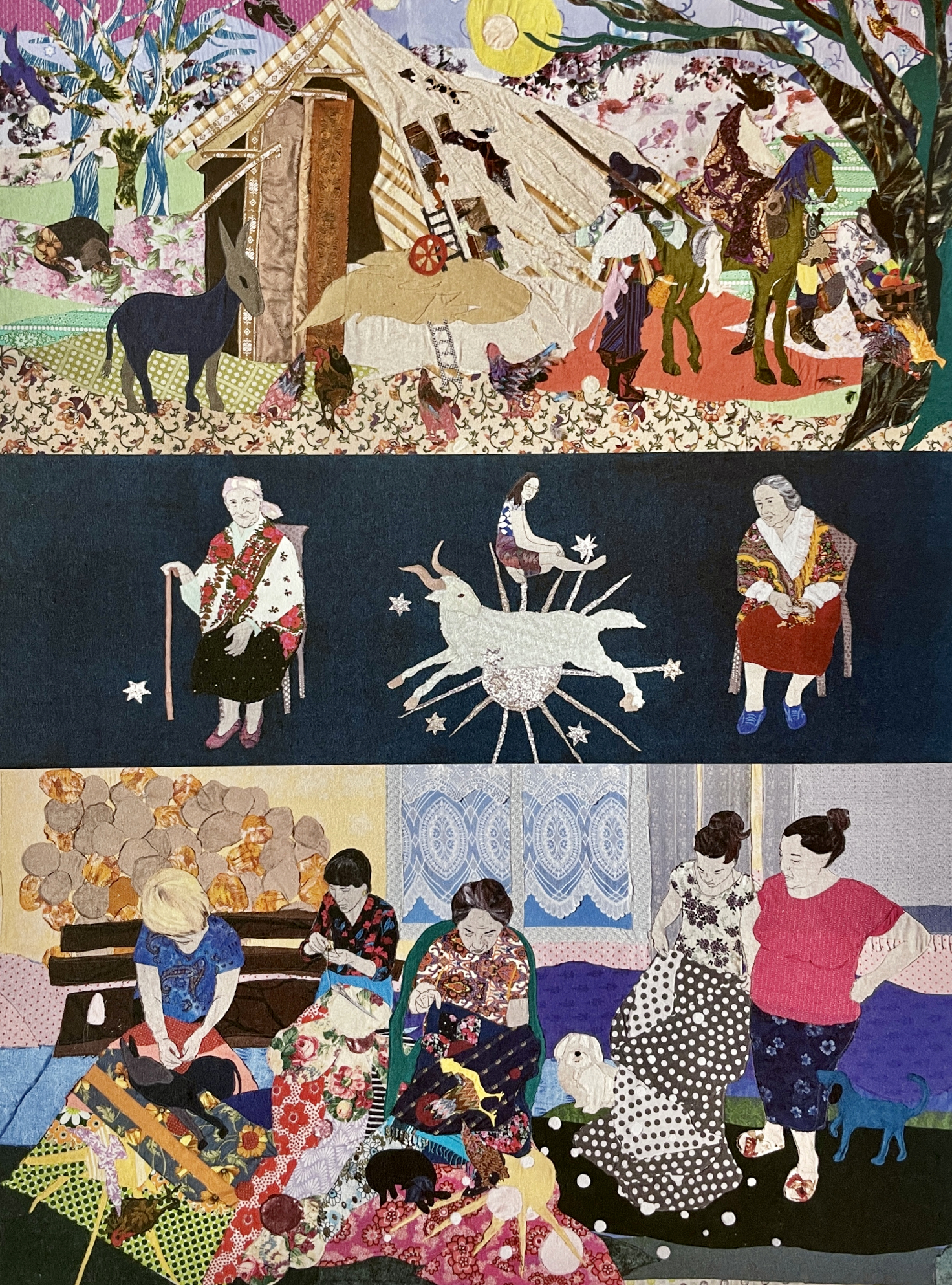
Venice Biennale installation by Małgorzata Mirga-Tas (2022) - artistic upcycling of old textile materials

=== Recycling ===
While recycling usually means the materials are remade into their original form, e.g., recycling plastic bottles into plastic polymers, which then produce plastic bottles through the manufacturing process, upcycling adds more value to the materials, as the name suggested. According to Watson & Wolfe "Upcycling, also known as creative reuse, is the process of transforming by-products, waste materials, useless, or unwanted products into new materials or products perceived to be of greater quality, such as artistic value or environmental value."

Similarly, recycle art may refer to art pieces using used materials in their original form while upcycle art may involve a transformation process such as breaking down, reforming, reassembling, and the like.

A common concept in Recycling is the 3Rs, which represent Reduce, Reuse, and Recycle. According to The Upcycle Artist's Handbook: A Comprehensive Guide to Creating Art from Waste published by Upcycle Art And Craft Society (UAACS). They coined a 3Rs principle for upcycling: Rethink, Reform, and Reborn.

"Rethink" involves reevaluating something and looking at an item from a new perspective. It means seeing the potential for repurposing, giving it a new function, or exploring other creative possibilities for that material. "Reform" involves physically altering the item, either by dismantling it, combining it with other materials, or using different techniques to change its form. This transformation of existing materials creates a new structure that better suits the artist's creative vision. "Reborn" is the final outcome when the upcycled item is given new life or purpose. It's like a resurrection of cast-offs that are given a second life"

=== Downcycling ===
Downcycling is the opposite of upcycling and the other part of the recycling process. Downcycling involves converting materials and products into new materials, sometimes of lesser quality. Most recycling involves converting or extracting useful materials from a product and creating a different product or material.

The terms upcycling and downcycling were first used in print in an article in SalvoNEWS by Thornton Kay quoting Reiner Pilz and published in 1994. This article described downcycling as a process where used products are broken down and given lesser value. This contrast was used to highlight the need for upcycling, where products are given more value through the act of repurposing them. Utilizing reclaimed woodblock, a road in Nuremberg, Germany underwent downcycling, specifically "waste" recycling.

Material downcycling occurs when it is either not possible or uneconomic to restore materials to their original quality, for example, when wrought aluminium alloys are melted to produce lower-grade casting alloys. Material upcycling, in the thermodynamic sense, is only possible if even more energy is added to upgrade the material quality. Two guiding questions to ask when assessing recovering for waste materials or products are: How much energy is required to restore the recovered material back to the desired material or product?, and, How does this quantity compare with obtaining the desired material or product from virgin or primary sources? In some cases, little energy is required to reuse a discarded product, for example, secondhand clothing. In other cases, the energy required to recover the materials is more than the energy required to process virgin material.

== Environmental impact ==
Upcycling is a significant step towards regenerative design culture where the end products are cleaner, healthier, and usually have a better value than the material inputs. For example, during the recycling process of plastics other than those used to create bottles, many different types of plastics are mixed, resulting in a hybrid. This hybrid is used in the manufacturing of plastic lumber applications. However, unlike the engineered polymer ABS which hold properties of several plastics well, recycled plastics suffer phase-separation that causes structural weakness in the final product.

Upcycling is a strategy used in the circular economy to reduce resource consumption by improving the value of products and closing material cycling through re-use. The lifespan of products is extended through the repair and repurposing that upcycling drives. While the rising global population results in more consumption and waste, eco-friendly practices like upcycling contribute to efforts to combat this issue. Upcycling combines recycling tactics and creative innovations to avoid product degradation.

== Applications ==
=== Art ===
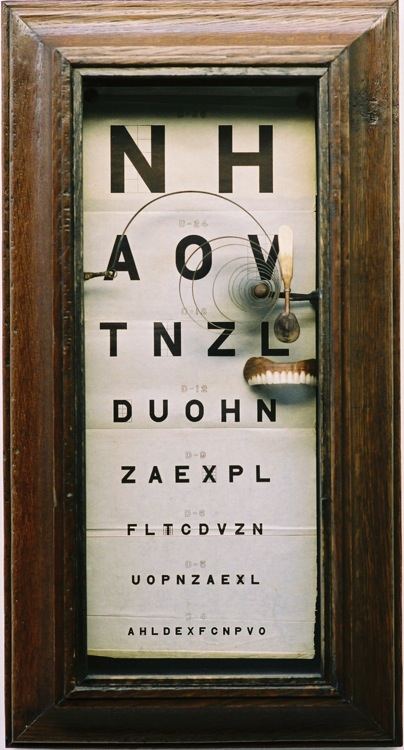
Johann Dieter Wassmann (Jeff Wassmann), Vorwarts! (Go Forward!) [sic], 1897

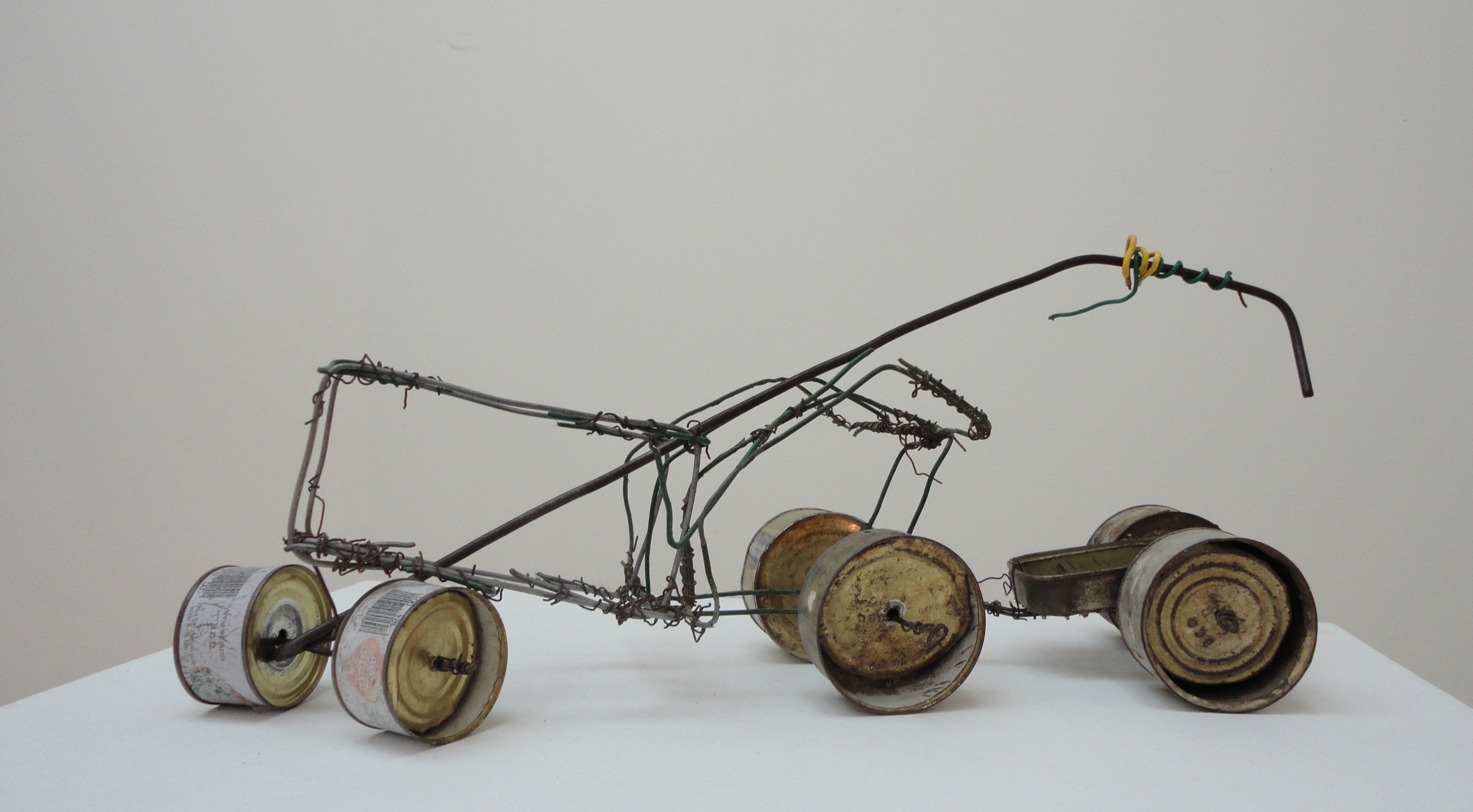
A toy from Southern Mount Hebron, on loan to the Israel Museum from a private collection

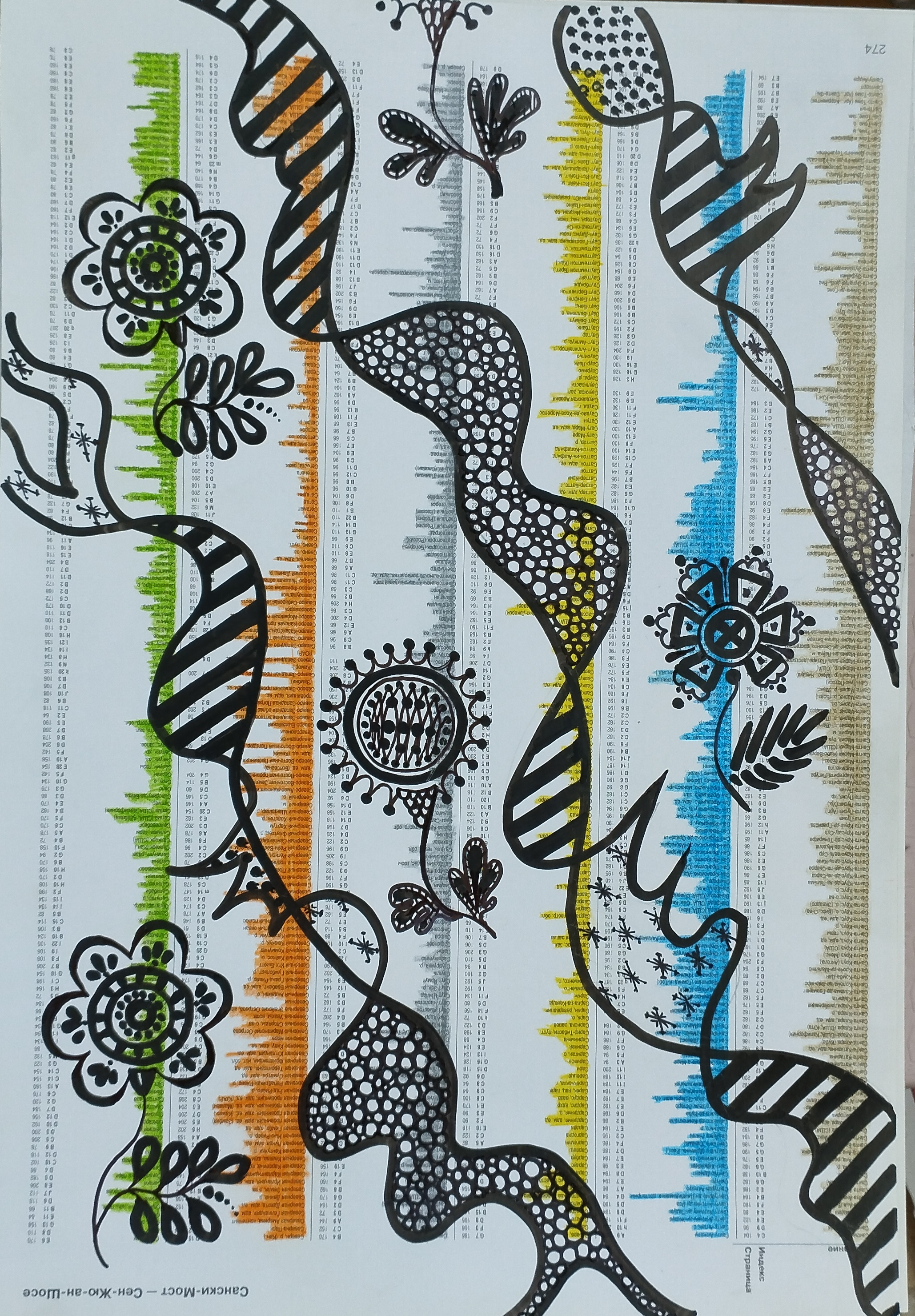
On the book page

Upcycle Art or sometimes known as Recycled Art or Recycl’Art is the transformation of waste or used materials and objects into art pieces.

The tradition of reusing found objects (objet trouvé) in mainstream art came of age sporadically through the 20th century, although it has long been a means of production in folk art. The Amish quilt, for example, came about through reapplication of salvaged fabric. Simon Rodia's Watts Towers (1921–1954) in Los Angeles exemplifies upcycling of scrap metal, pottery and broken glass on a grand scale; it consists of 17 structures, the tallest reaching over 30 meters into the Watts skyline.

Intellectually, upcycling bears some resemblance to the ready-made art of Marcel Duchamp and the Dadaists. Duchamp's Bicycle Wheel (1913), a front wheel and fork attached to a common stool, is among the earliest of these works, while Fountain (1917), a common urinal purchased at a hardware store, is arguably his best-known work. Pablo Picasso's Bull's Head (1942), a sculpture made from a discarded bicycle saddle and handlebars, is the Spanish painter's sly nod to the Dadaists. Throughout the mid-century, the artist Joseph Cornell fabricated collages and boxed assemblage works from old books, found objects and ephemera. Robert Rauschenberg collected trash and disused objects, first in Morocco and later on the streets of New York, to incorporate into his art works.

The idea of consciously raising the inherent value of recycled objects as a political statement, however, rather than presenting recycled objects as a reflection or outcome from the means of production, is largely a late 20th-century concept. Romuald Hazoumé, an artist from the West African Bénin, was heralded in 2007 for his use of discarded plastic gasoline and fuel canisters to resemble traditional African masks at Documenta 12 in Kassel, Germany. Hazoumé has said of these works, "I send back to the West that which belongs to them, that is to say, the refuse of consumer society that invades us every day." Jeff Wassmann, an American artist who has lived in Australia for the past 25 years, uses items found on beaches and junk stores in his travels to create the early Modern works of a fictional German relative, Johann Dieter Wassmann (1841–1898). In Vorwarts (Go Forward) (pictured), Wassmann uses four simple objects to depict a vision of modern man on the precarious eave of the 20th century: an early optometry chart as background, a clock spring as eye, a 19th-century Chinese bone opium spoon from the Australian gold fields as nose and an upper set of dentures found on an Australian beach as mouth. Wassmann is unusual among artists in that he does not sell his work, rather they are presented as gifts; by not allowing these works to re-enter the consumer cycle, he averts the commodification of his end product.

Max Zorn is a Dutch tape artist who creates artwork from ordinary brown packaging tape and hangs pieces on street lamps as a new form of street art at night. By adding and subtracting layers of tape on acrylic glass with a surgical scalpel, the artwork can only be visible when light is placed behind it, mimicking the effects similar to stained glass window methods. His technique with pioneering upcycling with street art has been featured at Frei-Cycle 2013, the first design fair for recycling and upcycling in Freiburg, Germany.

=== Music ===
A prominent example is the Recycled Orchestra of Cateura in Paraguay. The instruments of the orchestra are made from materials taken from the landfill of Asunción, whose name comes from the Cateura lagoon in the area. A limited part of its real history is narrated in the film Landfill Harmonic.

=== Industry ===
Many industrial processes, like plastic, paint, and electronic fabrication, rely on the consumption of finite resources. Furthermore, the waste may have an environmental impact and can affect human health. Within this context, upcycling describes the use of available and future technologies to reduce waste and resource consumption by creating a product with a higher value from waste or byproduct streams.

In consumer electronics, the process of re-manufacturing or refurbishment of second-hand products can be seen as upcycling because of the reduced energy and material consumption in contrast to new manufacturing. The re-manufactured product has a higher value than disposing or downcycling it. The use of Brewer's spent grain, a waste product of brewing processes, as a substrate in biogas processes eliminates the need for disposal and can generate significant profit to the overall brewing process. Depending on the substrate's price, a profit of approximately 20% of the operational costs is possible. In this process, the biogas plant acts as an "upcycler".

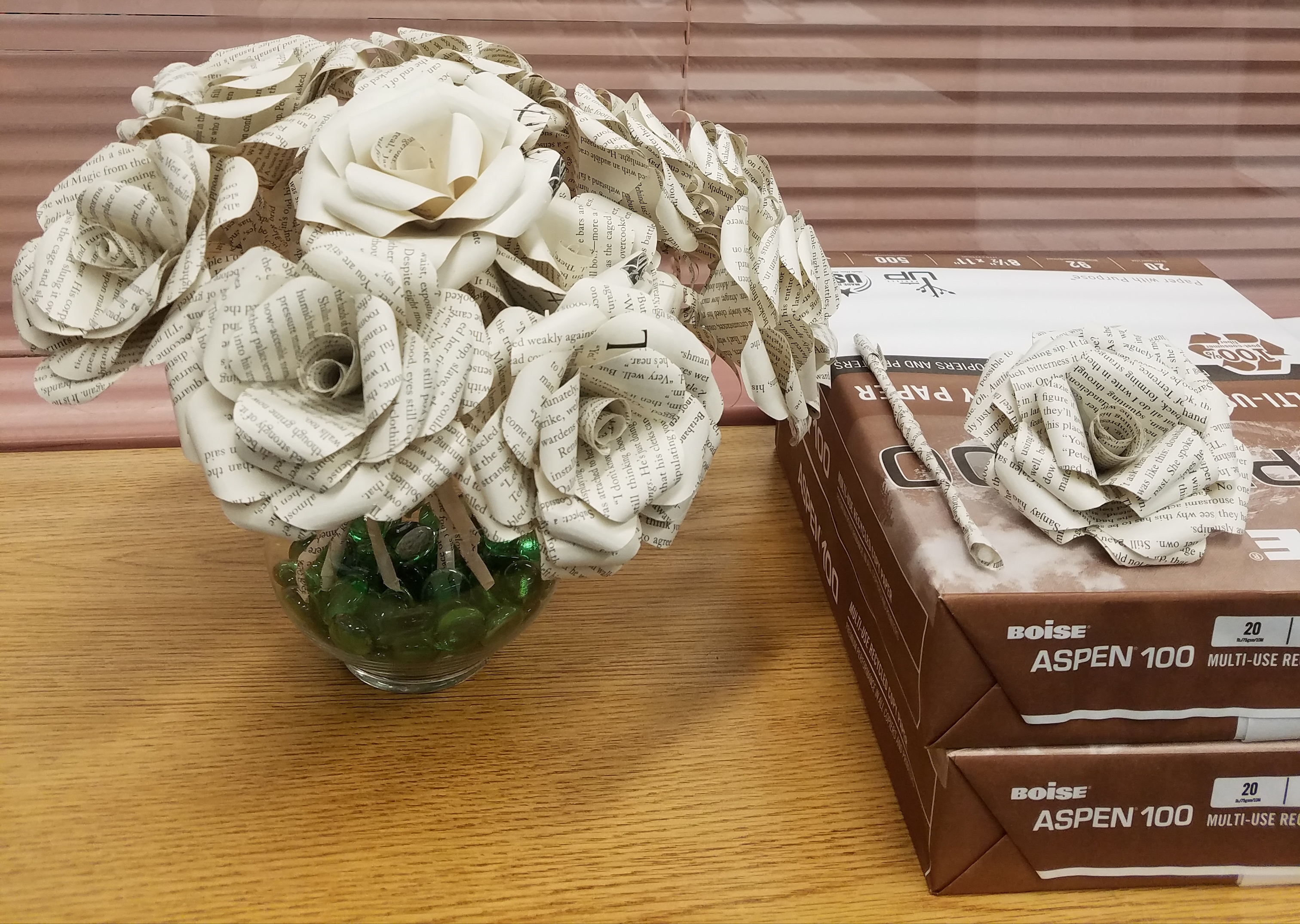
Roses made from upcycled library books

=== Clothes ===
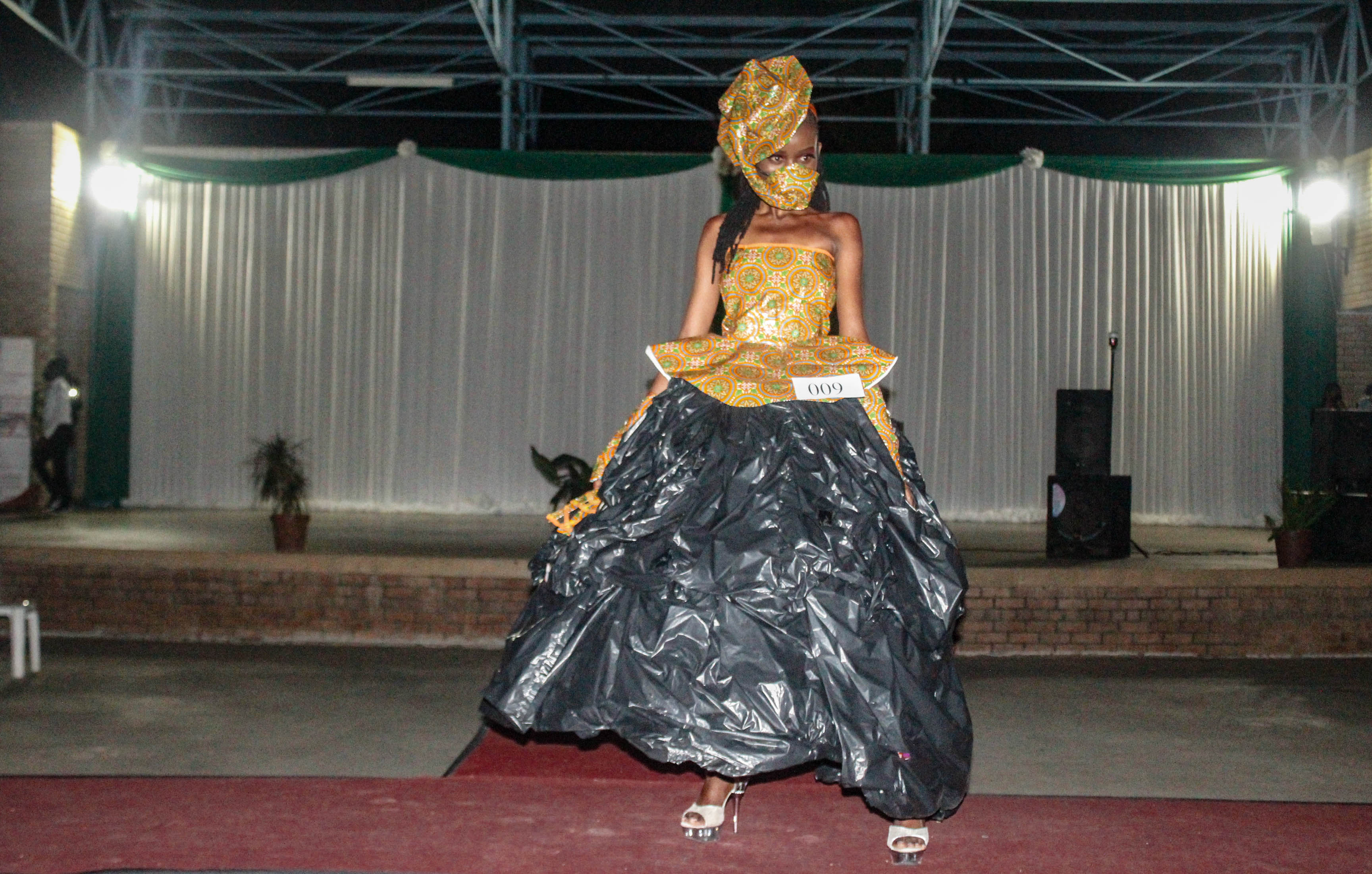
A woman wearing an upcycled dress

Designers have begun to use both industrial textile waste and existing clothing as the base material for creating new fashions. Upcycling has been known to use either pre-consumer or post-consumer waste or possibly a combination of the two. Pre-consumer waste is made while in the factory, such as fabric remnants left over from cutting out patterns. Textile upcycling has an official certification process called UPMADE. Fashion designers such as Ksenia Schnaider and Reet Aus have applied upcycling philosophy by designing entire collections from scraps. Elvis & Kresse is a brand that exclusively upcycles its collections and has been transforming decommissioned fire-hoses into luxury accessories since 2005 while donating 50% of the profits to The Fire Fighters Charity.

With the rising popularity of upcycling, several lawsuits have been filed by luxury trademark owners against parties that sell upcycled versions of their products featuring logos or other protected trademarks. In February 2021, Chanel filed a lawsuit for trademark infringement and unfair competition against Shiver + Duke, a jewelry company that repurposed authentic Chanel buttons without Chanel's knowledge or consent. The lawsuit alleged that Shiver + Duke's use of the buttons created customer confusion and was a materially different use from the original intended use. Similarly, Louis Vuitton accused Sandra Ling Designs, Inc. (SLD) for creating and selling apparel, handbags, and accessories made from authentic pre-owned Louis Vuitton goods. Louis Vuitton argued that the modified products failed to meet their quality standards and consumers would likely mistakenly believe that the items originated from the luxury brand. SLD argued that disclaimers were present on each upcycled product to prevent confusion. Ultimately, the parties reached a settlement, with SLD agreeing to pay a fine and withdraw all counterclaims.

Often, people practice linear economy where they are content to buy, use, then throw away. This system contributes to millions of kilos of textile waste being thrown away. While most textiles produced are recyclable, around 85% end up in landfills in the US alone. To live a sustainable life, clothing options opposite to the "throw away" attitude encouraged by fast fashion are needed. Upcycling can help with this, as it puts into practice a more circular economy model. A Circular Economy is where resources are used for as long as possible, getting the most value out of them while in use, then restored and repurposed when their use is over. Popularized by McDonough and Braungart, this has also been known as the cradle-to-cradle principle. This principle states a product should be designed either to have multiple life cycles or be biodegradable.

=== Food ===
Billions of pounds of food are wasted every year around the world, but there are ways that people reuse food and find a way to upcycle. One common method is to feed it to animals because many animals, such as pigs, will eat all the scraps given. Approximately 30% of the food livestock consumes, in total, comes from food waste in the supply chain, or crops that are grown and processed. Food waste can be donated and restaurants can save all the food customers do not eat. Donations can also be made by contacting local agricultural extension offices to find out where to donate food waste and how often and how much one can donate.

Another form of upcycling food is to break it down and use it as energy. Engineers have found a way to break the food down into a reusable bio-fuel by pressure cooking it and then they are able to make methane out of the remains which can be used to produce electricity and heat. When the food is not used in those ways, another way is to just break it down and use it in compost, which will improve the soil. Many types of food waste, such as fruits, vegetables, egg shells, nuts, and nut shells, can be used in compost to enrich soil. A 2019-founded non-profit, The Upcycled Food Association, established certification standards and a logo that allows consumers to be confident of the upcycled food being consumed. Whole Foods named upcycling one of the ten food trends of 2021.

=== Design processes ===
Tonnes of wastes are produced every day in our cities, and some educators are attempting to raise citizens' awareness, especially the youth. To redefine the concept of recycling previously confined to trash categorization, groups of young designers have attempted to transform "trash" into potentially marketable products such as backpacks made of waste plastic bags and area rugs created by reusing hides. One relevant book published by Community Museum Project in Hong Kong in 2010, was the first experiment on upcycling systems design. Spanning across material collecting, upcycling design, local production and public dissemination, it provides proposals towards a sustainable system that will cast impact on our strategies of waste handling and energy saving.

Hong Kong local inventor Gary Chan is actively involved in designing and making 'upcycling' bikes by making use of waste materials as parts for his bikes. He invented at least eight bikes using wastes as a majority of the materials. Gary and his partners at Wheel Thing Makers regularly collect useful wastes such as leather skin from sofas, hardwood plates of wardrobes, or rubber tires from vehicle repair stores in the waste collection station on streets.

== Potential technologies ==
The worldwide plastic production was 280 million tons in 2011 and production levels are growing every year. Its haphazard disposal causes severe environmental damage, such as the creation of the Great Pacific Garbage Patch. In 2018, global annual plastic consumption grew to over 320 million tons. In order to solve this problem, the employment of modern technologies and processes to reuse the waste plastic as a cheap substrate is under research. The goal is to bring this material from the waste stream back into the mainstream by developing processes, which will create an economic demand for them.

One approach in the field involves the conversion of waste plastics (like LDPE, PET, and HDPE) into paramagnetic, conducting microspheres or into carbon nano-materials by applying high temperatures and chemical vapor deposition. On a molecular level, the treatment of polymers like polypropylene or thermoplastics with electron beams (doses around 150 kGy) can increase material properties like bending strength and elasticity and provides an eco-friendly and sustainable way to upcycle them. Active research is being carried out for the biotransformation upcycling of plastic waste (e.g., polyethylene terephthalate and polyurethane) into PHA bioplastic using bacteria. PET could be converted into the biodegradable PHA by using a combination of temperature and microbial treatment. First it gets pyrolized at 450 °C and the resulting terephthalic acid is used as a substrate for microorganisms, which convert it finally into PHA. Similar to the aforementioned approach is the combination of nano-materials like carbon nanotubes with powdered orange peel as a composite material. This might be used to remove synthetic dyes from wastewater.

Biotechnology companies have recently shifted focus towards the conversion of agricultural waste, or biomass, to different chemicals or commodities. One company in particular, BioTork, has signed an agreement with the State of Hawaii and the USDA to convert the unmarketable papayas in Hawaii into fish feed. As part of this Zero Waste Initiative put forth by the State of Hawaii, BioTork will upcycle the otherwise wasted biomass into fish feed.

== See also ==
- Environmentalism
- Food rescue
- Reuse
- Reuse of bottles
- Scrapstore
- Trashion
- Waste hierarchy
- Waste minimisation
