= Michael A. Levine =

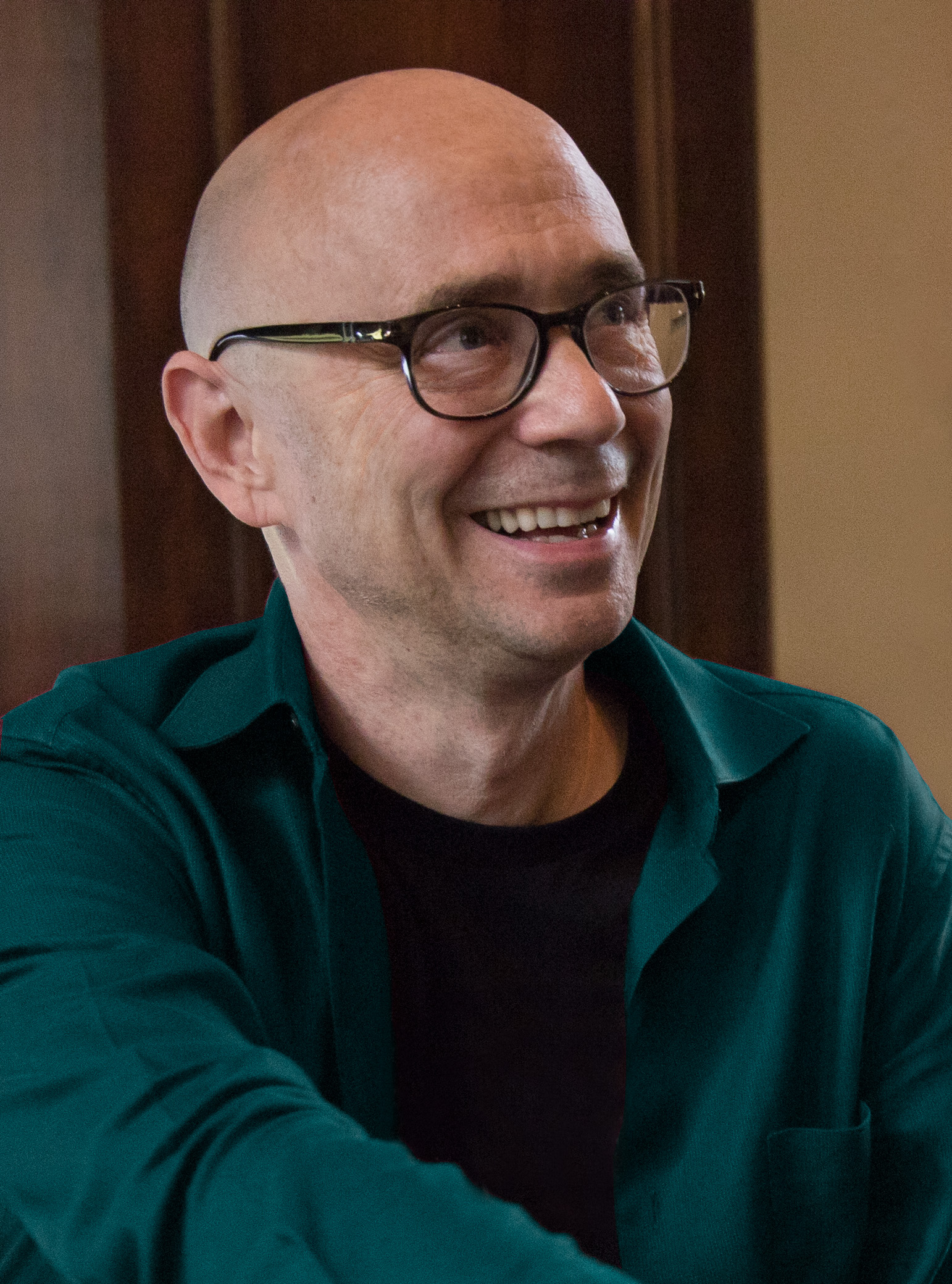

Background information
- Born: February 20, 1954 (age 72); Tokyo, Japan
- Genres: Classical; film scores
- Occupations: Composer; music producer; screenwriter
- Instruments: Violin; tenor violin; piano
- Website: www.michaellevinemusic.com

Michael A. Levine (born 20 February 1954 in Tokyo, Japan) is an American composer, music producer and screenwriter born in Japan and currently based in Los Angeles. He is best known for his work in film and television.

== Early life ==
Michael A. Levine was born in Tokyo, Japan on February 20th, 1954. At age 16, he attended McGill University. but changed schools a lot, eventually ending up at Berklee College of Music. At Berklee, he studied under Pat Metheny.

== Career ==
Trained as a violinist, Levine began his career as a studio musician in New York City in the 1980s playing both keyboards and violin. He appeared on recordings and/or live performances with Carla Bley, Michael Mantler, John Greaves, Peter Blegvad, Joe Jackson, Lenny Kravitz, Dr. John, Bill Frisell and Marianne Faithfull. His violin is a signature sound on Faithfull's rendition of "Boulevard of Broken Dreams".

In the mid-1980s, Levine led the New York City-based New Wave quartet, No Guitars, in which he sang and played electric violin. The band released a self-titled album in 1982. No Guitars' "I Don't Believe It" was one of the first videos on the newly launched MTV. The Music Paper out of Long Island quoted Yes and Moody Blue keyboardist, Patrick Moraz, calling Levine "The Jimi Hendrix of the violin”, an opinion echoed by many.

By the late 1980s, he switched his emphasis to composition, first making a name in advertising. With lyricist Ken Shuldman, he wrote "Gimme a Break", the Kit Kat jingle. In a 2003 study of earworms (tunes that get stuck in people's heads), University of Cincinnati researcher James Kellaris named "Gimme a Break" as one of the top ten worst offenders.

Levine has continued to compose for commercials, including the 2022 Gucci Eyewear campaign starring Billie Eilish.

== Film and TV ==
In the 2000s, Levine's established himself as a television composer with the dramas Cold Case and Close to Home, both produced by Jerry Bruckheimer. In 2007, he scored the features Adrift in Manhattan and Columbus Day and in 2011, the thriller No One Will Know. In 2012 he became the composer for the George Lucas-produced Star Wars Detours animated series featuring Seth Green and Seth MacFarlane.

Levine, along with Michael Wolff, produced the songs for the hit Nickelodeon musical comedy series The Naked Brothers Band, and two of its soundtrack albums, The Naked Brothers Band and I Don't Want to Go to School. One of the songs from the first season, "Crazy Car", peaked at #83 on the Top 100 Billboard Charts and was written by Nat Wolff back when he was 6 years old, who was the youngest person to ever compose a song on the charts.

Michael has done extensive work for other film composers including Hans Zimmer, Harry Gregson-Williams, Rupert Gregson-Williams, and Cliff Martinez as an arranger and composer of additional music. He was the arranger of the choral version of "Spider-Pig" from The Simpsons Movie and co-composed the Megamind theme alongside Hans Zimmer and Junkie XL as well as writing additional music. In addition, he composed the music for the murder scene in Harry Gregson-Williams' score for Veronica Guerin.

Levine often plays violin on his and others' recordings. He received on screen credit for his violin work on Hans Zimmer's score for Dunkirk. Levine had previously played on Zimmer’s and James Newton Howard's score for the Batman movie, The Dark Knight. An accomplished whistler, Levine whistled on Christopher Lennertz's score to The Wedding Ringer. He also plays tenor violin and the ciola (pronounced chee OH la) an instrument the size of a viola but which sounds in the same range as a cello.

In an interview for Video DailyMotion, Levine stated, “I am a violinist by training, a keyboard player by necessity, a guitarist by aspiration and a harmonica player just to annoy people..." before jamming out on a harmonica.

In 2009, Levine and composer Mac Quayle performed a series of Sleep Concerts under the name of Zeitgeist & Kismet with Levine on looping electric violin and Quayle on keyboards. Attendees brought pillows, blankets and sleeping mats. It is not known whether the later Max Richter concerts were influenced by them.

In 2013 Levine, with Lucas Cantor, arranged and produced Lorde's spooky rendition of "Everybody Wants to Rule the World" from the Hunger Games: Catching Fire soundtrack. The cover was later used by numerous other projects including a promo for the new network BBC First and in the trailer for the 2014 film Dracula Untold. The rendition appeared on the New Zealand Singles Chart at number 14. It reached number 53 in Australia, number 65 in the UK, number 93 in France, and number 27 on the US Hot Rock Songs. In addition, Levine and Cantor also produced Demarest's cover of the Neil Young classic "Heart of Gold", which was featured in the official trailer for Out of the Furnace.

Levine wrote the score for the 2015 documentary Landfill Harmonic, which tells the story of the Recycled Orchestra of Cateura, Paraguay. The film has won numerous awards at festivals worldwide including the World Cinema Award at the 2015 AFI Festival and the Audience Award in the 24 Beats Per Second category at 2015 SXSW. He also composed the closing credits song "Cateura – Vamos a Soñar" with lyricists Mariana Barreto and Rodolfo Madero.

Levine worked on numerous projects between 2016 and 2017 including Lego DC Super Hero Girls: Brain Drain, which won the 2018 Golden Reel Award for Outstanding Achievement in Sound Editing, and Served Like a Girl, a documentary about U.S. female service personnel returning to civilian life after tours of duty in Iraq and Afghanistan. Served Like a Girl was a nominee for the SXSW 2017 Grand Jury Award.

In 2018, Levine composed the score for Siren, a Freeform (formerly ABC Family) science fiction series about the arrival of an enigmatic mermaid whose appearance spells havoc for a small fishing town. Based on a story by executive producers Eric Wald and Dean White, Siren was screened at the 2017 New York Comic Con.

For the 2018 film 3100: Run and Become, Levine wrote and produced the song "Running" with legendary vocalist Roberta Flack.

As a screenwriter, Levine has been a semifinalist twice for the Oscar's Nicholl Fellowship. The first time for Levine's script Useless, about President Ulysses S. Grant. Followed by a nod for Levine's screenplay for The Last Battleship, based on a true story involving his father, Solomon B. Levine, who was the translator for the Japanese Admiral who designed the Yamato.

Levine is the recipient of eight ASCAP awards, two Clio awards, an NEA grant, an LA Weekly Theater Award, a Meet The Composer grant, and a Massachusetts Arts Foundation grant.

In 2026, his song "Rita's Song" won the Grand Prize for Music Video at the Golden State Film Festival.

== Video games ==
At E3 2014, the Levine produced Lorde's version of “Everybody Wants to Rule The World”, was used in the cinematic trailer of Assassin's Creed Unity. The trailer garnered over 38 million views on YouTube.

In 2017, Michael wrote and produced the theme song for Resident Evil VII Biohazard, the first virtual reality game in the series. The song, a reworking and expansion of the traditional Go Tell Aunt Rhody, is sung by U.K.- based New Zealander, Jordan Reyne.

== Concert and theater music ==
His Concerto for Pedal Steel Guitar and Orchestra is believed to be the first concerto ever written for the pedal steel guitar. It was premiered on April 16, 2005, in a performance by the Nashville Chamber Orchestra with Gary Morse (of Dierks Bentley and Dwight Yoakam's bands) as soloist, and Paul Gambill as conductor.

Levine also composed Divination By Mirrors for musical saw and strings. It was premiered in New York City's Merkin Hall in 1998 by the New York Virtuosi with Dale Stuckenbruck as the saw soloist. The piece makes extensive use of quarter tones and golden mean sections.

Levine has also written several opera and musical theater pieces including Orpheus Electronica (2000), widely believed to be the first "rave opera". Orpheus was developed for the stage by William Philip McKinley, who directed Spiderman: Turn Off the Dark and The Boy From Oz on Broadway.

The 2009 production of Jim Leonard's Battle Hymn by the Circle X Theatre garnered Michael a LA Weekly Award for Original music.

In 2017 Levine collaborated with percussionist Dame Evelyn Glennie on an album called Double Crossings. On September 12, 2021, they performed an excerpt from the album in an all-star concert at Wembley Arena in London to welcome home paralympians from the Tokyo games. Glennie was on marimba and Levine on electric violin.

Levine also composed all the original music for the Big Apple Circus which opened at Lincoln Center in NYC on Nov. 12, 2021. He was invited back for the 2022 season and composed new music for all of the new acts.

== Writing and film production ==
Levine wrote and produced the short science-fiction film The Aspirant which in 2021 won 20 festival “bests” and a half-dozen other awards. Directed by Adam Orton and starring Talia Goodman and Michael Cortez, The Aspirant has been praised by a number of respected industry figures including Gore Verbinski, Vicky Jenson, Matt Groening, and Wim Wenders. Talia Goodman also won “Best Female Actor” in the Gainescon Action, Horror, and Sci-Fi Film Festival.

== Governorship ==
Levine served as a Governor of the Television Academy (Emmys) Music Peer Group for two consecutive terms from 2013 to 2016. During his tenure, Levine fought for - and achieved - the inclusion of music supervisors to the academy, as well as the creation of the first Emmy for Music Supervision. While Governor, Levine created Score!, the first Academy-sponsored orchestral concert of television music, performed on May 21, 2014. And, with fellow Governor Rickey Minor, he created Words + Music, a concert of songs and scores from television, performed on June 29, 2017.

== Filmography (as composer) ==
2026

- Rita's Song

2025

- The Stones of Dunamase Castle

2024

- The Sadness in Freedom
- A Guest in My Country
- Outbreak
- Where the Fuck Are Your Teeth?

2023

- The Overlook

2022

- The Third Defector
- The Unquiet Dead

2021

- The Lost Pirate Kingdom
- Welcome to Forever

2020

- The Aspirant
- Gather
- aTypical Wednesday
- Household Demons
- Exit Package

2019

- MAD?
- The Desecrated
- Extra Innings

2018

- Siren
- The Son ("additional music")
- 3100: Run and Become
- Dunkirk ("featured violinist")
- The Desecrated
- Go Tell Aunt Rhody

2017

- Amelia 2.0
- Can Hitler Happen Here
- Lego DC Super Hero Girls: Brain Drain
- Served Like a Girl
- Career Suicide: Arthur's Edge

2016

- City 40
- Tip of the Tongue
- All Downhill from Here
- The Summerland Project

2015

- Film U
- Legacy
- Landfill Harmonic
- French Kiss
- Saint or Sinner: Pope Francis

2014

- Future Hero
- Fugly!

2013

- The Fairfax File
- Kristin's Christmas Past
- Out of the Furnace
- Star Wars Detours
- The Makeover

2012

- Star Wars Detours
- Ten Men on the Field (main title composer)
- No One Will Know

2011

- Hide
- Immortals ("featured violinist")
- Rango ("additional music")

2010

- Megamind (additional music)
- Prince of Persia: The Sands of Time (additional music)

2009

- Cold Case Season 7 (TV)
- Monsters vs. Aliens (additional music)

2008

- Cold Case Season 6 (TV)
- Surviving Sid
- Misconceptions
- Columbus Day

2007

- Adrift in Manhattan
- Bee Movie (additional music)
- Cold Case Season 5 (TV)
- The Simpsons Movie (additional music)

2006

- Close to Home Season 2 (TV)
- Cold Case Season 4 (TV)

2005

- Close to Home Season 1 (TV)
- Cold Case Season 3 (TV)
- A Tribute to Lon Chaney

2004

- Cold Case Season 2 (TV)
- Green Screen Show aka Drew Carey's Green Screen Show (TV)
- Wicker Park (additional music)

2003

- Cold Case Season 1 (TV)
- Family Tree (short)
- The John Garfield Story (TV)
- Veronica Guerin (additional music)
- Wonderland (additional music)

2002

- Gone Nutty aka Scrat's Missing Adventure
- The Main Stream (TV)
- Jack Pierce: The Man Behind the Monsters

2001

- Hubert's Brain
- Trigger Happy

2000

- Inventing a Girl: An Experience in Homeschooling

1999

- Any Given Sunday (additional music)
- Cupidity
- The Lady with the Torch

1998

- The End of the Road

1997

- Orangutans: Just Hangin On
- Sex and Other Matters of Life and Death

1996

- The Mantis Murder
- The Universal Story

== Video games (as composer) ==
2017

- Resident Evil 7: Biohazard
