= Favio Chavez =

Argentinian musician (born 1975)

Favio Chávez
- Born: Favio Hernán Chávez Morán; December 5, 1975 (age 50); Buenos Aires, Argentina
- Known for: Environmental technician, Musician

Favio Hernán Chávez Morán (born December 5, 1975), is an Argentinian musician, environmental technician, and director of the Recycled Orchestra of Cateura, since 2012.

He has served as director of the music school of Carapeguá and departmental coordinator of the program "Sounds of the Earth", from 2002 to 2011; as well as Academic Coordinator of the project created by the Paraguayan teacher Luis Szarán, from 2008 to October 2011.

He worked as an environmental educator of the program "Procicla", of NGOs "Alter Life" and "Geam", in the Cateura landfill of Asunción, since February 2006 and resigned in March 2007. He was later named "Sounds of the Earth" as supervisor of the workshop of lutería in Cateura, that opened in May 2007, in charge of the luthier Carlos Uliambre.

He integrated the first set of recycled instruments, created by idea of Luis Szarán, along with five other young people from Carapeguá; which was first presented at Oxford University in March 2008. At the suggestion of Szarán, the group "Los Reciclados" of Carapeguá was also created, which Chavez directed until he was dismissed from "Sounds of the Earth" in October 2011.

In July 2012, Chavez announced that the music school "Sounds of Cateura" was independent of the program "Sounds of the Earth", and the community project happened to be called the Recycled Orchestra of Cateura. In November 2012, the production of "Landfill Harmonic" launched a new promotional teaser, omitting any mention of "Sounds of the Earth" and Luis Szarán.

In May 2016, an original member of the orchestra and two members of the parents' association, who helped build the current building of the Cateura music school; filed a complaint with the Office of the Prosecutor against the director's administration, for alleged lack of transparency. The complaint is backed by three senators from Paraguay.
