= SCORE! =

SCORE! or Score! may refer to:

- SCORE! Educational Centers
- Score! (novel) by Jilly Cooper
- Score! A Concert Celebrating Music Composed for Television
- Score! Classic Goals
