= Columbus Day (film) =

- Film poster
- Directed by: Charles Burmeister
- Written by: Charles Burmeister
- Produced by: Ewan Astrowsky; Dana Brunetti; Ewa Jakubas; Val Kilmer; Kevin Spacey
- Starring: Val Kilmer; Marg Helgenberger; Bobb'e J. Thompson; Richard Edson; Jack McGee; Lobo Sebastian; Ivana Milicevic; Ashley Johnson; Mark Kelly; Wilmer Valderrama
- Music by: Michael A. Levine
- Release dates: April 28, 2008; August 19, 2008 (United States)
- Running time: 90 minutes
- Country: United States
- Language: English

Columbus Day is a 2008 crime drama starring Val Kilmer, Marg Helgenberger and Wilmer Valderrama.

== Plot ==
A thief has just one morning to fix the damage done during the biggest heist of his career, all while attempting to repair his relationship with his ex-wife.

== Cast ==
- Val Kilmer as John Cologene, the thief
- Marg Helgenberger as Alice Cologene, John's ex-wife
- Bobb'e J. Thompson as Antoine
- Richard Edson as Manny
- Jack McGee as Paul the Pigeon Man
- Lobo Sebastian as Jimmy Espinosa
- Ivana Milicevic as Cheryl
- Ashley Johnson as Alana Cologene, John's daughter
- Mark Kelly as Leonard
- Wilmer Valderrama as Max, John's longtime associate
- Michael Muhney as Detective Daniels
- Shelley Malil as Babul
- Sean Blakemore as Officer Walters
