= Debra Wilson =

American actress

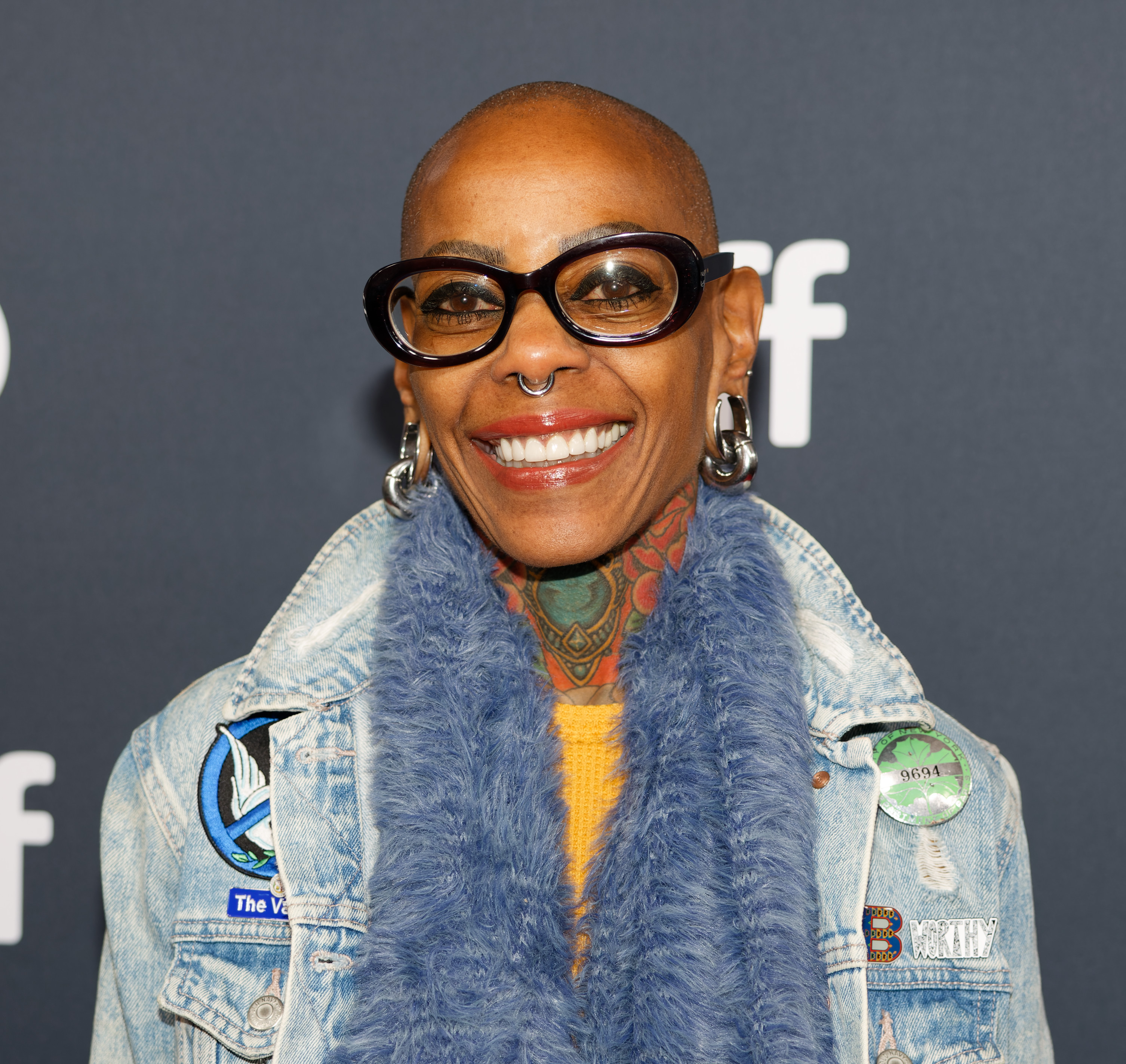
- Wilson at the 2024 Toronto International Film Festival
- Born: New York City, United States
- Other names: Debra Wilson Skelton; Debra Skelton
- Education: Syracuse University
- Occupations: Actress; comedian
- Years active: 1992–present
- Spouse: Cliff Skelton (m. 2006; sep. 2010)

Debra Wilson (Note: Formerly also known as Debra Wilson Skelton or Debra Skelton.) is an American actress and comedian. She is the longest-serving original cast member on the sketch comedy series Mad TV, having appeared on the show's first eight seasons from 1995 to 2003. As a voice actress, she has voiced various characters on television shows and video games, including Mao Mao: Heroes of Pure Heart, Baby Shark's Big Show!, Spitting Image, Mirror's Edge Catalyst, Wolfenstein, Days Gone, Star Wars Jedi: Fallen Order, Star Wars Jedi: Survivor, Halo Infinite, Diablo IV, Suicide Squad: Kill the Justice League, Star Trek: Deep Space Nine, Clone Drone in the Hyperdome, Destiny 2, Marvel's Wolverine, as well as Death Stranding 2: On the Beach.

She also starred in the films The Summerland Project and Bodied. From 2022 to 2025, Wilson voiced Daisy Duck in Mickey Mouse Funhouse.

== Early life ==
Wilson was born and raised in New York City, in the neighborhood of Ozone Park, Queens, and attended the New York City High School of the Performing Arts. After graduation, she studied television and radio broadcasting at Syracuse University. She worked as a preschool teacher during the 1980s for the All Saints Church, in Sunnyside, Queens.

Wilson made her television acting debut on The Apollo Comedy Hour and The Uptown Comedy Club, where she became a series regular. She co-hosted Can We Shop? with Joan Rivers. She continued her work in television working as a spokesperson for Burger King, and guest-starring in New York Undercover.

== Career ==
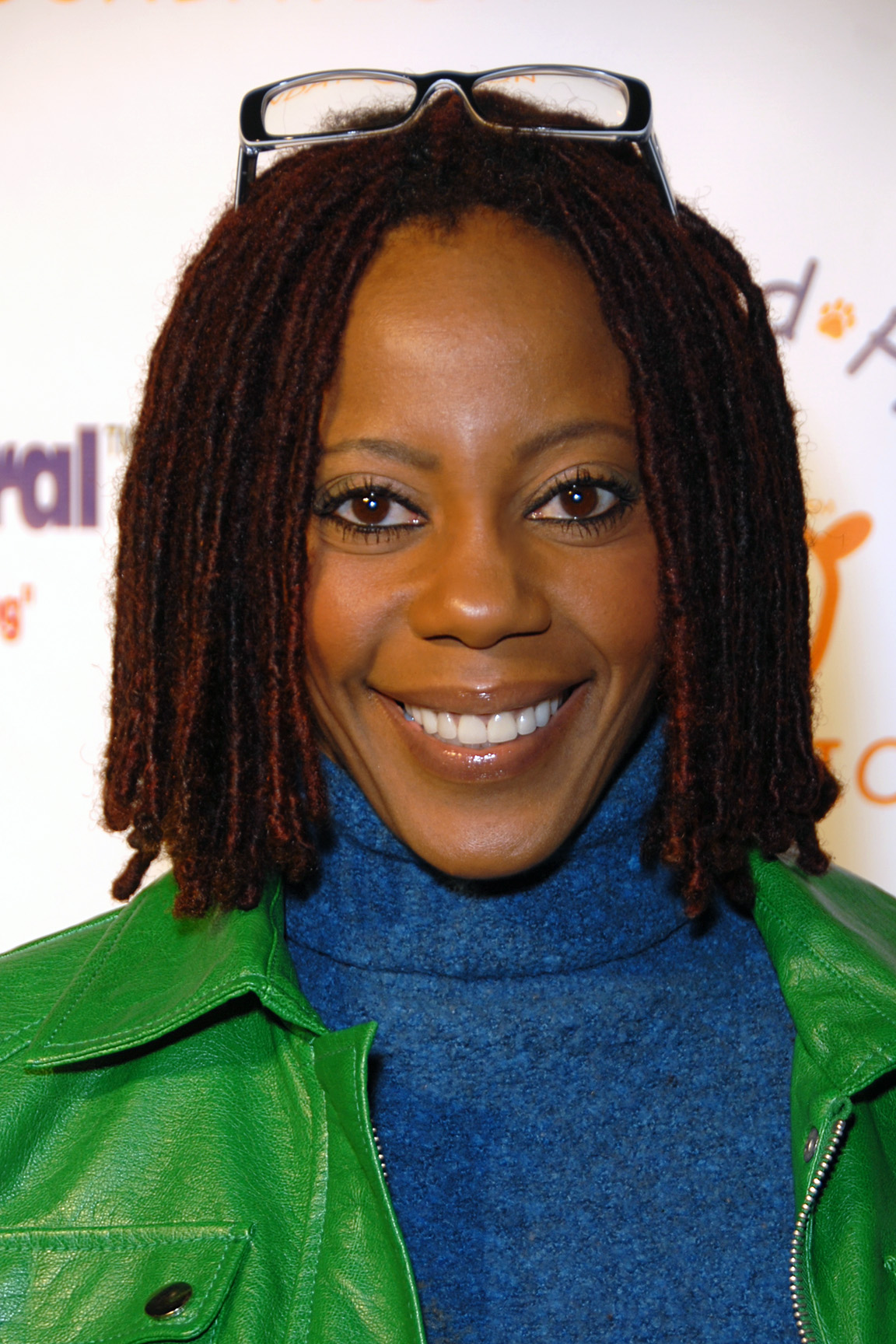
Wilson in 2010

=== Mad TV ===
Wilson was one of the original eight cast members of Mad TV when the series aired in 1995. Wilson came to the show with a background in sketch comedy, improv, and television.

Wilson was credited for creating some of the most popular recurring characters on the show. Among her characters were Latina bimbo Melina (Lida and Melina), Reality Check's Tovah McQueen, Stick Chick Autumn, Kappa Kappa Kappa sorority sister Hayden Brooks, Alexis Duvane (Prehistoric Glamazon Huntresses), blaxploitation actress Cocoa Latette (Son of Dolemite), Lowered Expectations Host and Ms. Not Nice (Jenny Jones). Perhaps her best known character was the fast-talking "Black American Princess" Bunifa Latifah Halifah Sharifa Jackson.

Wilson's most recognized impressions on the show were of Oprah Winfrey and Whitney Houston. She has also played Oprah or Oprah-like characters in other media, most notably Scary Movie 4 and The Proud Family.

=== Television ===
Since her debut on MADtv, Wilson has done voice acting on episodes on numerous television shows, landing some recurring roles on such shows as Clone High, Family Guy, and did puppeteer work on The Mr. Potato Head Show. She voiced Captain Lisa Cusak in the Star Trek: Deep Space Nine episode "The Sound of Her Voice".

Wilson has made numerous independent films, including Naked Angel, Jane White Is Sick and Twisted, Skin Deep, and Soulmates. She was also in an episode of Without a Trace as a doctor, and appeared three times as a working girl, Divine, in episodes of CSI: Crime Scene Investigation.

She and MADtv co-star Nicole Sullivan have done commercials for Pepsi's Sierra Mist. She appeared as herself on the February 15, 1999, episode of WCW Monday Nitro accompanying MADtv castmate Will Sasso in his professional wrestling match against Bret Hart. She also appeared on the British Whose Line Is It Anyway?.

She was the co-host of TV Guide Channel's TV Watercooler with John Fugelsang, until she was replaced by Teresa Strasser in October 2006. She was also a co-host on GSN Live until she left in January 2010.

Wilson is the announcer of the revival of the NBC game show Weakest Link hosted by Jane Lynch.

In July 2022, Nickelodeon announced that Wilson would voice the character Headless Headmistress Bloodgood in the 2022 animated reboot series Monster High.

=== Theater ===
Wilson performed off-Broadway with the improvisational comedy troupe Noo Yawk Tawk directed by Richmond Shepard at The Village Gate Theater (1988–1991).

=== Video games ===
Wilson has voiced many video game characters, such as her role as Grace Walker in Wolfenstein II: The New Colossus and her role as Cere Junda in Star Wars Jedi: Fallen Order and its sequel Star Wars Jedi: Survivor. She also appeared in Call of Duty: Modern Warfare as General Lyons. Her other video game voice work includes The Outer Worlds, Gears 5, Wolfenstein: Youngblood, Rage 2, Days Gone, Fallout: New Vegas, Fallout 76, and Far Cry New Dawn. She is the voice of Draka in World of Warcraft: Shadowlands. She is the voice of Savathûn in Destiny 2 and the Harbinger in Halo Infinite. She also plays The Doctor in Death Stranding 2 and Inquisitor Lödwyn in Avowed. More recently, she voiced Sifuu in Palia and The Houndmaster in Dead by Daylight.

== Personal life ==
Wilson married writer and director Cliff Skelton in April 2006. They separated in 2010, citing irreconcilable differences.

== Filmography ==
=== Film ===
Year	Title	Role	Notes	Ref.
1994	Cracking Up			
1995	Blue in the Face	Statistician		
1996	Girl 6	Salesgirl #3		
1997	Gridlock'd	Medicaid Woman #2		
1997	B*A*P*S	Flight Attendant		
1997	Soulmates	Jennifer Williams		
1997	Asylum	Belinda Davis		
1997	Sleeping Together	Wendy		
1998	Star Trek: The Experience: The Klingon Encounter	Security Officer	Short	
2000	Rubbernecking	Julia		
2002	Jane White Is Sick & Twisted	Chi-Chi		
2003	Skin Deep	Alex		
2004	Target	Nolan		
2004	Nine Lives	Lisa		
2005	Bringing Up BayBay	Pam Wilcox, BayBay Girl	Short film; also writer	
2006	Whitepaddy	Aunt Tiny		
2006	Danny Roane: First Time Director	Rehab nurse		
2006	The Adventures of Brer Rabbit	Sister Buzzard	Voice; direct-to-video	
2006	Scary Movie 4	Oprah Winfrey		
2006	Over the Hedge	Debbie	Voice	
2006	Mandingo in a Box	Host	Short film	
2006	Shut Up and Shoot!	Nikki Ryder		
2006	Rockin' Meera	Rudy		
2007	If I Had Known I Was a Genius	Teresa Reed		
2007	Lord Help Us	Shariffer Simms	Direct-to-video	
2007	Cordially Invited	Vivian Dunn		
2007	The Chosen One	Akia May	Voice	
2008	Cuttin' da Mustard	Actress		
2009	Knight to F4	Cheryl Johnson		
2009	Psyche on Melrose	Hostess	Short film	
2009	The Haunted World of El Superbeasto	Various voices	Direct-to-video	
2009	Avatar	Na'vi troupe member		
2009	Friends of Dorothy	Hillary	Short film	
2010	Perfect Combination	Mrs. Lewis		
2010	Oprah's Last Show	Oprah Winfrey	Short film	
2011	Hoodwinked Too! Hood vs. Evil	Iana	Voice	
2011	Naked Angel	Mama Tony		
2011	Division III: Football's Finest	Mandy		
2012	Back Then	Georgia Miller		
2012	Bed-Stuy Lullaby	Sha'rell	Short film	
2013	Cordially Invited – The Wedding Day of Alton & Kenya	Vivian Dunn		
2014	Jungle Shuffle	Kam	Voice	
2014	The Hobbit: The Battle of the Five Armies	Creatures	Voice	
2014	Knock 'em Dead	Darien		
2014	Untold	Merrel		
2014	Fatal Acquittal	Detective Bell		
2014	10 Year Plan	Minister		
2015	Midlife	Diane Freeland		
2015	Mothers of the Bride	Freesia the producer		
2015	Hotel Transylvania 2	Additional voices		
2016	Caged No More	Leona		
2016	The Summerland Project	Adah Allen		
2017	Open Marriage	Vulnavia		
2018	Painkillers	Gail Konrad		
2018	Bodied	Dean Hampton		
2018	The Nun	Demons	Voice	
2018	The Christmas Chronicles	Lars	Voice	
2019	Star Wars: The Rise of Skywalker	Nambi Ghima	Voice	
2020	Ride Your Wave	Hinako's Mom	Voice; English dub	
2021	Mortal Kombat Legends: Battle of the Realms	D'Vorah	Voice; direct-to-video	
2021	The Loud House Movie	Nana May, Nana Collette, Nana Helene, Mrs. Turnberry	Voice	
2022	Mortal Kombat Legends: Snow Blind	Graji	Voice; direct-to-video	
2022	Call Me Miss Cleo	Herself	Documentary	
2023	Cobweb	Monster Sarah	Voice	
2023	Baby Shark's Big Movie!	Grandma Shark	Voice	
TBA	Weird Party †	—N/a	Post-production	

=== Television ===
Year	Title	Role	Notes	Ref.
1992	The Uptown Comedy Club	Various	Main cast	
1995	New York Undercover	Shanna	Episode: "High on the Hog"	
1995–2016	Mad TV	Various	Main Cast: seasons 1–8, Guest: seasons 10, 13–15	
1998	Star Trek: Deep Space Nine	Lisa Cusak	Voice; episode: "The Sound of Her Voice"	
1998	Whose Line Is It Anyway?	Herself	Episode: "Episode #10.9"	
1998–1999	The Mr. Potato Head Show	Queenie	Voice; also puppeteer Main role; 13 episodes	
2000–2025	Family Guy	Whoopi Goldberg, Angela Bassett, Star Jones, Whitney Houston, Brittney Griner, Various voices	Recurring role	
2001	Gary & Mike	Various voices	13 episodes	
2001	The Oblongs	Various voices	2 episodes	
2002	Rapsittie Street Kids: Believe In Santa	Great Grandma Fran	Voice; television film	
2002–2003; 2024	Clone High	Various voices	4 episodes	
2002–2003	The Proud Family	Oprah Winfrey	Voice; 2 episodes	
2003	The Proud Family	Basil, Tobasco	Voice; episode: "Adventures in Bebe Sitting"	
2003	The Parkers	Zorah	Episode: "Kimmie Has Two Moms"	
2004	Without a Trace	Doctor	Episode: "Hawks and Handsaws"	
2004	I'm with Her	Brenda	Episode: "Friends in Low Places"	
2004	That's So Raven	Maisha	Episode: "Spa Day Afternoon"	
2004–2007	CSI: Crime Scene Investigation	Divine	3 episodes	
2005	Second Time Around	Deonne	Episode: "You're Fired"	
2005–2025	American Dad!	Whitney Houston, Various voices	Recurring role	
2006	In Justice	Detective Powell	Episode: "Confessions"	
2006	Celebrity Paranormal Project	Herself	Episode: "Cult Commune"	
2007	Higglytown Heroes	Marine Biologist Hero	Voice; episode: "Little Big Fish"	
2007	Super Sweet 16: The Movie	Edan Day	Television film (MTV)	
2008	Reno 911!	Dominatrix	3 episodes	
2008	The Boondocks	Deborah LeVil	Voice; 2 episodes	
2008	Terminator: The Sarah Connor Chronicles	Lilian	Episode: "Automatic for the People"	
2009	90210	Teacher	Episode: "Hello, Goodbye, Amen"	
2009	RuPaul's Drag Race	Herself	Guest Judge, Episode: "Queens Of All Media"	
2009–2010	GSN Live	Herself	Co-host	
2012–2015	Black Dynamite	Amazon Moon Bitch leader, Lil' Orphan Penny, Eartha K.I.T.T., Various	Voice; 17 episodes	
2013	2 Broke Girls	Delores	Episode: "And the Temporary Distraction"	
2013	The First Family	Helen	Episode: "The First Driver"	
2013	The Cleveland Show	Various voices	Episode: "Of Lice and Men"	
2013	Save Me	Stephanie	Episode: "Heavenly Hostess"	
2013	Mad	Various voices	Episode: "Alfred's Game/We Are X-Men"	
2013	Doom Patrol	Madame Rouge	Voice; episode: "The Spy Within the Doom Patrol"	
2013–2014	DC Super-Pets!	Various voices	3 episodes	
2014	Regular Show	Council Woman, Thunder Girl, Blonde Girl	Voice; episode: "Dodge This"	
2014–2017	All Hail King Julien	Masikura, Mary-Ann, Tammy, various	Voice; 21 episodes	
2016	Dead 7	Apocalypta	Television film	
2016	Z Nation	Linda	Episode: "Doc's Angels"	
2016–2017	Pig Goat Banana Cricket	Nasty Cat, Mrs. Manelli, Lady Fart, Baby Sweat, Convention Con Nerd	Voice, 3 episodes	
2017	Superior Donuts	Lyric	Episode: "Flour Power"	
2018	Lost in Oz	Brenda	Voice; episode: "The Eclipse"	
2018	The Last Sharknado: It's About Time	New Bryan	Television film	
2019	The Jellies	Various voices	2 episodes	
2019	Cannon Busters	Lady Day	Voice; English dub	
2019	Avengers Assemble	Councilor Achebe, Dora Milaje Member	Voice; 2 episodes	
2019–2020	Mao Mao: Heroes of Pure Heart	Ramaraffe, Ketchup, Muffins, Marion, Camille, Scoops, Various voices	Voice; recurring role	
2019–2021	Ben 10	Maxine Sez	Voice, 2 episodes	
2020	Just Roll with It	Nana Blatt	Episode: "Grandma & Grandpa Sittin' in a Tree"	
2020	Spitting Image	Beyoncé, Kamala Harris, Michelle Obama, Oprah Winfrey, Nicki Minaj	15 episodes	
2020–2025	Baby Shark's Big Show!	Grandma Shark	Voice; English dub Main role	
2021	Final Space	Quinn's Mother	Voice; episode: "All the Moments Lost"	
2021	The Casagrandes	Papaya	Voice; episode: "Do the Fruit Shake"	
2021	Dogs in Space	Kira, Duchess	Voice	
2021	Frankelda's Book of Spooks	Totolina, Grandma	Voice; 2023 English dub	
2021–2024	What If...?	Additional voices	Voice; 9 episodes	
2022	The Owl House	Terra Snapdragon	Voice; 4 episodes	
2022	The Loud House	Various voices	4 episodes	
2022	We Baby Bears	Brassy Maine Coon, Cat	Voice; episode: "High Baby Fashion"	
2022	Mickey Saves Christmas	Daisy Duck	Voice, television special	
2022	Love, Death & Robots	Possessed Harper	Voice, episode: "In Vault Halls Entombed"	
2022	Oddballs	Louise, Female Cop	Voice, 2 episodes	
2022–2024	Star Trek: Prodigy	Captain Trij, A.I Computer, various	Voice, 5 episodes	
2022–2024	Monster High	Headless Headmistress Bloodgood	Voice; main role	
2022–2025	Mickey Mouse Funhouse	Daisy Duck	Voice; main role (seasons 2–3)	
2023	Star Trek: Lower Decks	Z'oto	Voice, episode: "Something Borrowed, Something Green"	
2023	Mech Cadets	Chief Max	Voice	
2023	Mickey and Friends Trick or Treats	Daisy Duck	Voice	
2023	The Really Loud House	P.A. Announcer	Voice, episode: "The Princess and the Everlasting Emerald: A Royal Woods Fairytale"	
2023	A Black Lady Sketch Show	Miss Althea (runner)	1 episode	
2023–present	My Adventures with Superman	Amanda Waller	Voice; recurring role	
2023–2025	Star Wars: Young Jedi Adventures	Braygh	Voice, 3 episodes	
2024	Nature	Narrator	Episode: "Gorilla"	
2024	The Fairly OddParents: A New Wish	Rhonda	Voice, episode: "Rattleconda Racers"	
2024–present	The Legend of Vox Machina	Pa'tice	Voice; 2 episodes	
2025	Eyes of Wakanda	Dora General	Voice; episode: "The Last Panther"	
2025	Marvel Zombies	Denise, additional voices	Voice	
2025	Dr. Seuss's Horton!	Trudy	Voice	
2026	Among Us	Yellow	Voice	
2026	The Doomies	Mordam	Voice	
2026	X-Men '97	Candra / X-Ternal	Voice	

=== Theatre ===
Year	Title	Role	Venue(s)	Notes	Ref.
1988–1991	Noo Yawk Tawk	Improv Actor, Ensemble	The Village Gate Theater; Off-Broadway, New York City		

=== Video games ===
Year	Title	Role	Notes	Ref.
2006	Ice Age 2: The Meltdown	Ellie		
2006	X-Men: The Official Game	Storm		
2007	Halo 3	Marines		
2008	Speed Racer: The Videogame	Booster Mbube		
2008	Metal Gear Solid 4: Guns of the Patriots	Crying Wolf		
2008	Fracture	Additional voices		
2009	Halo 3: ODST	Marine #4		
2010	Dead to Rights: Retribution	Security Guard		
2010	StarCraft II: Wings of Liberty	Additional voices		
2010	Fallout: New Vegas	Additional voices		
2011	Infamous 2	Female Pedestrians, The Storyteller		
2013	Grand Theft Auto V	The Local Population		
2014	Elder Scrolls Online	Additional voices		
2014	WildStar	Dreadphage Ohmna, Selene, Granok Female		
2014	Call of Duty: Advanced Warfare	Additional voices		
2014	World of Warcraft: Warlords of Draenor	Monster Vocal Effects		
2016	Mirror's Edge Catalyst	Rebecca Thane		
2016	Gears of War 4	Aspho Point Gear		
2016	Far Cry Primal	Batari		
2016	Final Fantasy XV	Additional voices		
2017	Wolfenstein II: The New Colossus	Grace Walker	Motion capture	
2017–18	Batman: The Enemy Within	Amanda Waller, additional voices		
2018	God of War	Additional voices		
2018	Just Cause 4	Izzy		
2018	Guild Wars 2	Ambassador Sianna		
2018–19	The Walking Dead: The Final Season	Dorian		
2019	Days Gone	Addison 'Addy' Walker	Motion capture	
2019	Wolfenstein: Youngblood	Grace Walker	Motion capture	
2019	Gears 5	COG Soldier, Onyx Guard		
2019	Indivisible	Snake Queen		
2019	Call of Duty: Modern Warfare	General Lyons	Motion capture	
2019	The Outer Worlds	Sophia Akande	Motion capture	
2019	Star Wars Jedi: Fallen Order	Cere Junda		
2019	Guild Wars 2	Varinia Stormsounder, Jormag		
2019	Rage 2	Jazz Spinner, Goon Assault		
2019	Remnant: From the Ashes	Liz-2		
2020	Gears Tactics	Mikayla Dorn		
2020	World of Warcraft: Shadowlands	Baroness Draka		
2020	Desperados III	Isabelle Moreau		
2020	Bugsnax	Shellsy "Shelda" Woolbag		
2021	Persona 5 Strikers	Additional voices		
2021	Ratchet & Clank: Rift Apart	Kit		
2021	Destiny 2: Beyond Light	Savathûn		
2021	Monster Hunter Rise	Monju		
2021	Marvel's Avengers	Okoye	War for Wakanda DLC expansion	
2021	Ruined King: A League of Legends Story	Buhru Elder, additional voices		
2021	Halo Infinite	Harbinger		
2022	League of Legends	Renata Glasc		
2022	Destiny 2: The Witch Queen	Savathûn		
2022	Aperture Desk Job	Prison Warden, Announcer		
2022	God of War Ragnarök	Grýla		
2023	Forspoken	Bellette Krau	Motion capture	
2023	Star Wars Jedi: Survivor	Cere Junda	Motion capture	
2023	Star Trek: Resurgence	Duvall, Hotari Queen		
2023	Diablo IV	Prava, additional voices		
2023	Destiny 2: Lightfall	Savathûn		
2023	Marvel's Spider-Man 2	Additional voices		
2023	Call of Duty: Modern Warfare III	SSO Selma Greene		
2024	Suicide Squad: Kill the Justice League	Amanda Waller	Voice and motion capture	
2024	Disney Speedstorm	Ursula		
2024	Destiny 2: The Final Shape	Savathûn		
2024	World of Warcraft: The War Within	Speaker Brinthe		
2024	Rivals of Aether 2	Envis		
2024	Dead by Daylight	Portia Maye / The Houndmaster		
2024	Clone Drone in the Hyperdome	FLAMEWAR		
2025	Like a Dragon: Pirate Yakuza in Hawaii	Queen Michele	English dubbing	
2025	Call of Duty: Black Ops 7	The Twins		
2025	Civilization VII	Harriet Tubman		
2025	Doom: The Dark Ages	Commander Thira		
2025	Date Everything!	Winnifred		
2025	Death Stranding 2: On the Beach	Doctor		
2025	The Outer Worlds 2	Ethel Tinsley		
2025	Destiny 2: The Edge of Fate	Ikora Rey	Stand-in for Mara Junot	
2025	Octopath Traveler 0	Tatloch		
2026	Yakuza Kiwami 3 & Dark Ties	Additional voices		
2026	Mouse: P.I. for Hire	Old Shrew Lady, Judge Fatale		
2026	Marvel's Wolverine	Callisto	Voice and motion capture	
2026	Ace Combat 8: Wings of Theve	X.O. (Jessica Pike)		
2026	Call of Duty: Modern Warfare 4	Additional voices		
2026	Grand Theft Auto VI	The Local Population		
TBA	Deadlock (video game)	The Archmother's herald		

=== Web series ===
Year	Title	Role	Notes	Ref.
2012–2013	Lips	Ex-girlfriend	2 episodes	
2017	My Sister Is So Gay	Becca	6 episodes	

=== Theme parks ===
Year	Title	Role	Notes	Ref.
2007	Finding Nemo Submarine Voyage	Bridge		

=== Novels ===
Year	Title	Role	Notes	Ref.
2025	Halo: Edge of Dawn	The Harbinger	Adjunct "Harbinger's Lament"	

== Awards and nominations ==
Year	Award	Category	Nominated work	Result	Ref.
2024	British Academy Games Awards	Performer in a Supporting Role	Star Wars Jedi: Survivor	Nominated	
