= Naked Angel =

- Directed by: Christina Morales Hemenway
- Written by: Christina Morales Hemenway
- Produced by: Christina Morales Hemenway; Andy Wolf
- Starring: James Duval; Cameron Watkins; Debra Wilson; Kelly Perine; Johnny Moreno; Linda Chapman; Julian Sapala; Andy Wolf
- Cinematography: Keith Jefferies
- Edited by: Keith Jefferies
- Production company: Dancingstar Productions
- Release date: June 16, 2011
- Country: United States
- Language: English

Naked Angel is a 2011 independent film written and directed by Christina Morales Hemenway. Starring James Duval and introducing Cameron Watkins, the film revolves around Andreas, played by Duval who wants to let go of life and falls in love with an angel who longs to be human and is inspired to live again.

== Cast ==
- James Duval as Andreas
- Cameron Watkins as Estelle
- Debra Wilson as Mama Tony
- Kelly Perine as Homeless Musician
- Johnny Moreno as Joe
- Linda Chapman as Camille
- Julian Sapala as Laz
- Andy Wolf as Priest
- Ashley Goulson as Laria

== Production ==
Director Christina Morales Hemenway had the following to say about the film:

Naked Angel is a mystic drama about an angel who is trying to earn her wings but falls in love with a mortal man and then finds she can no longer hear the voice of God. One thing that is especially exciting about producing this film is that it will be a community filmmaking experience. We plan to hire as many local people as possible, get local businesses involved, and showcase Ann Arbor locations in the film.
