= Cateura =

Landfill and neighborhood in Asunción, Paraguay

Cateura landfill
- Landfill
- Interactive map of Cateura landfill
- Coordinates: 25°19′39″S 57°38′38″W
- Country: Paraguay
- City: Asunción
- Website: https://www.empoparaguay.com

Cateura is the name of the landfill of Asunción, created in 1984 by the municipality of the capital of Paraguay, whose name comes from the Cateura lagoon, which is located near the property, private access, which has become landfill.

Its name is also associated with the surrounding community, which are the San Miguel, Republicano, San Cayetano, Santa Ana, Villa Colorada, Bañado Sur and Tacumbú neighborhoods, which are flood zones, near the Paraguay River, located mainly to the south of Asuncion.

Since September 2005, the Cateura landfill is managed by Empo Ltda. And Associates, a concessionaire of the Municipality of Asunción, for the final disposal of solid waste. Associations of "hookers" work in the farm, as they are recyclers who use a hook to remove the rubbish.

The Cateura landfill has become famous by the Recycled Orchestra of Cateura, and its documentary Landfill Harmonic (2015). The original project was created in 2006 with the music school "Sonidos de Cateura", founded by the "Procicla" recycling program of the NGO Alter Vida, in partnership with the community program "Sounds of the Earth", of the association Tierranuestra. While the recycled instruments began with materials of Cateura, but in the workshop of lutería of "Sounds of the Earth", in the neighborhood New City of Asunción, to six kilometers of the landfill. "Sounds of the Earth" it was created in 2002, by Luis Szaran.

When the former academic coordinator of "Sounds of the Earth", Favio Chávez, was dismissed in October 2011; appropriated "Sounds of Cateura" and the project of recycled instruments, and in July 2012 announced its disengagement from the original program. Currently, Favio Chavez is reported for alleged lack of transparency in the administration of donations, by original members of the community project.
