= Gary Chan (inventor) =

Hong Kong cyclist and inventor

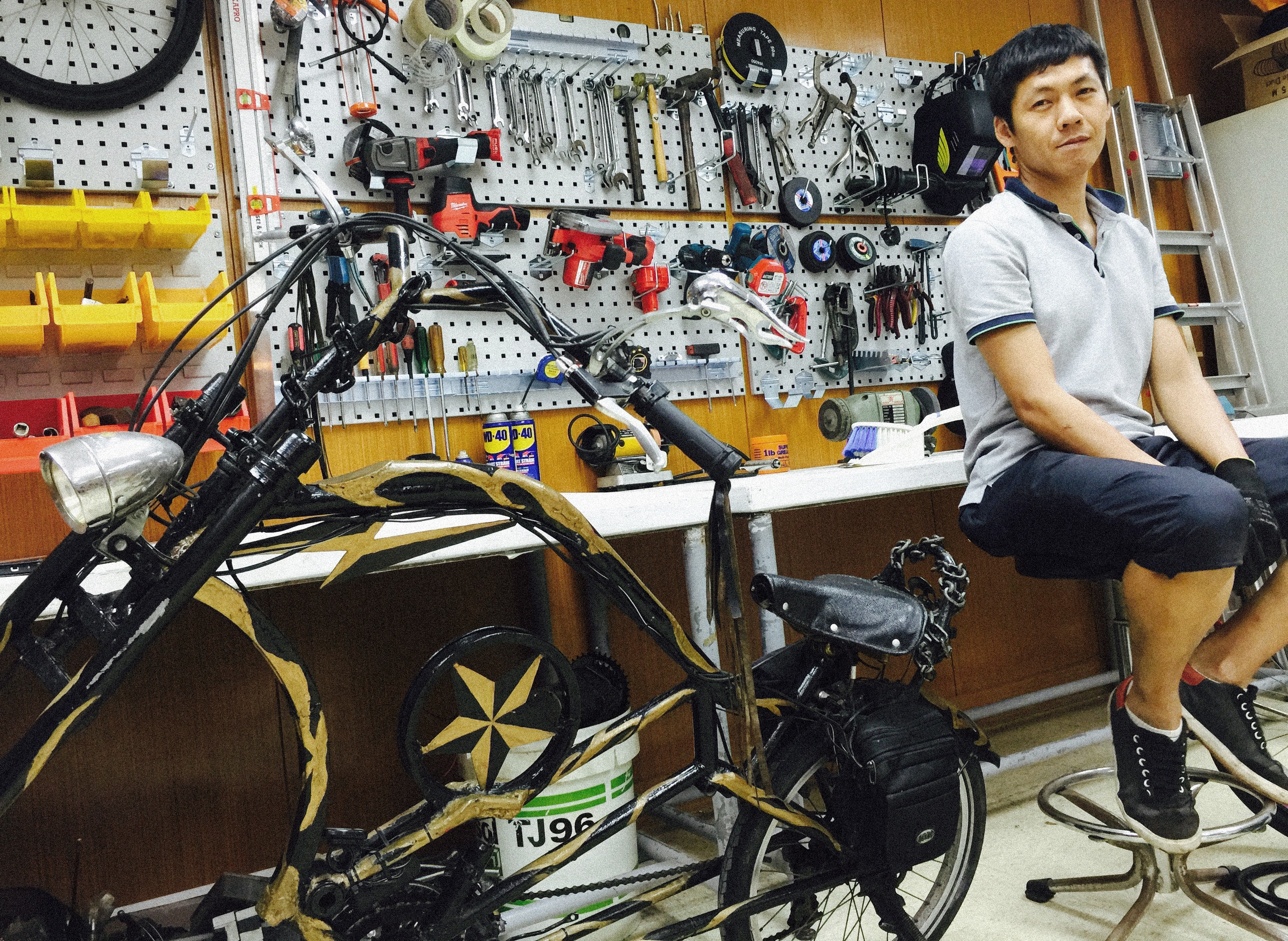
Gary Chan with one of his bicycle creation "Harley Bike" in the studio of Wheel Thing Makers

Gary Chan (Chinese: 陳培基; Cantonese Yale: Chàhn Pùih Gèi) is a cyclist and inventor from Hong Kong and one of the pioneers in making upcycling bicycles in Hong Kong. He was prosecuted by police for riding his self-made solar-powered bicycle in summer 2014 and the case raised criticism of Hong Kong's outmoded traffic laws.

== Early life ==
Gary Chan showed great creativity in his childhood years and wanted to become a sculptor, but had little aptitude in his academic studies. He performed well in sports when he was studying in Jockey Club Ti-I College. He left school after Form 3 and had a string of jobs in manufacturing and construction.

== Inventor career ==
He began to create custom bicycles in 2005 using recycled metal and bicycle parts. He learnt welding skills from a metal workshop near his day job.

In August 2014, Chan was arrested while riding a prototype solar-powered bicycle in Kwun Tong after the police had received complaints. The bicycle was confiscated. He was charged with driving an unregistered vehicle and driving without valid insurance. The solar-powered bicycle was confiscated. The court case was heard on 19 September 2014, in which Chan pleaded guilty. He was fined HK$3,000 and his driving licence was suspended for one year. The case raised public concern about outdated government policies on traffic enforcement and innovation.

Gary Chan and four other bicycle enthusiasts from various disciplines founded Wheel Things Makers in 2015 and established the group's first workshop in To Kwa Wan They participated the first official Maker Faire as one of the flagship event in October 2015, and further joined E-Maker Faire Hong Kong 2015 (香港造節) in April 2017 as an co-organiser of the 'Large Activities' 'E-Go Kart (我是車手) in the 2-days event. One of their exhibits was a wagon powered by a detachable electric drill, which was deliberately designed to mock the police's decision to prosecute Chan the year before.

== Participated exhibitions ==
Gary Chan participated various exhibitions, art shows, campaigns as well as sharing sessions in Hong Kong.

Year	Title of events	Nature of participation	Venue	Organizer
Oct 2014	I’MPERFECT BIKE	Exhibition; Sharing session; Bikes demonstration	Oi!	Oi! and I'MPERFECT
Nov 2014	單車狂人Gary Chan的環保單車展	Exhibition; Sharing session; Bikes demonstration	JCCAC	Hong Kong Art & Design Community
Jan 2015	問藝25 Quest of Art	Exhibition; Sharing session	JCCAC Gallery	JCTIC
Feb 2015	領匯環保單車火龍展覽	Exhibition	樂富廣場	領匯
Feb 2015	單車舞火龍	Campaign; Festival	天水圍天瑞商場	領匯
Apr 2017	Maker Faire HK17 (造大世界)	Karts Competition, Bikes demonstration	PolyU	PolyU/ Wheel Thing Makers 軸物行者
