= Landfill Harmonic =

- Directed by: Brad Allgood; Graham Townsley
- Story by: Alejandra Amarilla(story concept by)
- Produced by: Juliana Peñaranda-Loftus
- Starring: Ada Ríos, Jorge Ríos, Tania Vera Hertz, Idalina Hertz, María Ríos, Esteban Irrazabal, Nicolás Gómez, Favio Chávez
- Cinematography: Neil Barrett; Tim Fabrizio; Brad Allgood
- Edited by: Brad Allgood and Virginia Quesada
- Music by: Michael A. Levine
- Production companies: Meetai Films; Bella Voce Films; Eureka Productions; Hidden Village Films
- Distributed by: The Film Collaborative
- Release dates: 18 March 2015 (SXSW); 18 August 2016 (Paraguay)
- Running time: 84 min
- Countries: USA; Paraguay
- Languages: Spanish, English, Guaraní

Landfill Harmonic (stylized as landfillharmonic) is a 2015 documentary film directed by Brad Allgood and Graham Townsley. It stars and tells the story of Paraguayan music teacher Favio Chavez and his Recycled Orchestra of Cateura, a children's orchestra in Paraguay which performs with materials recycled from a trash landfill near Asunción. According to The Huffington Post, "[t]he film is both an exposé on the harsh conditions of slum life and a commentary on the global threats of consumption and waste".

== Overview ==
The film details the founding and development of the Recycled Orchestra of Cateura.

When Luis Szarán and Favio Chavez came to Cateura, a landfill located in Asunción, Paraguay, to start a music school, they realized that they had more students than instruments. Thanks to the resourcefulness of Cola, a Cateurian garbage picker, an orchestra came together, now featuring violins, cellos, and other instruments artfully put together from trash. Now known as the Recycled Orchestra of Cateura, the orchestra soon became independent. In 2012 it performed in Brazil and Colombia under Chavez's direction.

== Release ==
The film debuted on March 18, 2015. In the United States, the film is shown on HBO.

== Reception ==
Ken Jaworoski of The New York Times gave the felt the film was "an inspiring tale" and the children involved in it were "wonderful to watch", though he criticized the interview style. John DeFore of The Hollywood Reporter called it "[a]n unlikely breakthrough story whose happy endings come with asterisks".

This film was shortlisted for the Environmental Award at the 2015 Sheffield Doc/Fest documentary festival, where it won a special mention.

=== Awards ===
- 2015 Winner, Audience Award – “24 Beats Per Second”, South By Southwest Film Festival
- 2015 Winner, The Moving Mountains Prize (third place), Telluride Mountainfilm Festival
- 2015 Winner, Runner Up Audience Award for Best Feature Film, Illuminate Film Festival 2015
- 2015 Winner, Audience Award and Inspiring Lives Award, San Francisco Green Film Festival 2015
- 2015 Winner, Family Friendly feature Award, Maui Film Festival 2015
- 2015 Special Mention, Environmental category, Sheffield Doc Festival 2015
- 2015 winner, VIFF Impact: International Audience Award, Vancouver International Film Festival
