= The Summerland Project =

The Summerland Project is a stage play and subsequent movie adaptation written by Rob Merritt about a dying woman whose mind is placed into an artificial body.

== Plot ==
Amelia and Carter Summerland are a newly married couple. Amelia has an aneurysm and becomes locked in. Carter is approached by a corporation who would like to use Amelia as a test subject for a procedure where they will copy her personality and memories into an android body.

The themes of The Summerland Project have been compared to Pygmalion, Blade Runner (and its source material Do Androids Dream of Electric Sheep?), Frankenstein, and The Monkey's Paw. The story raises questions about the nature of humanity.

== Play ==
The play was initially produced as part of the Theatre Cedar Rapids Underground New Play Festival in 2011. It then again appeared as a TCR mainstage production in 2013. Subsequently, the play was performed at the Olathe Civic Theatre in Kansas City, Kansas.

== Film ==
The Summerland Project
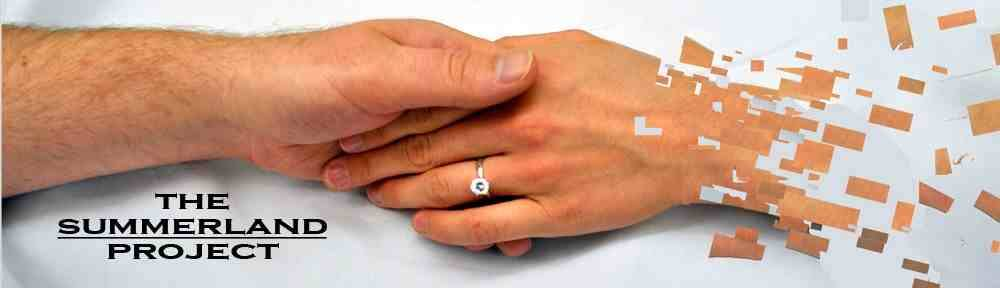
- Directed by: Adam Orton
- Written by: Rob Merritt
- Based on: The Summerland Project by Rob Merritt
- Produced by: Alex Levine, Enrico Natale
- Starring: Ben Whitehair; Ed Begley Jr. Chris Ellis; Eddie Jemison; Kate Vernon; Debra Wilson; Kamar de los Reyes; Angela Billman
- Cinematography: Camrin Petramale
- Edited by: Izaak Levison-Share
- Music by: Michael A. Levine
- Production company: More Productions
- Release date: August 4, 2017 (Cedar Rapids, Iowa)
- Country: United States
- Language: English

Filming for the movie version, entitled Amelia 2.0 began on September 16, 2014 in Cedar Rapids, Iowa. The film features Ben Whitehair, Ed Begley Jr., Chris Ellis, Eddie Jemison, Kate Vernon, Debra Wilson, Kamar de los Reyes, Malorie Mackey, John Livingston, as well as Angela Billman reprising the role of Amelia Summerland that she performed in the 2013 stage version. The film was directed by Adam Orton. The film was targeted for release for the 2016 film festival season. The film had a budget of $1.2 million.
