= Concerto for Pedal Steel Guitar and Orchestra =

Composition by Michael A. Levine

The Concerto for Pedal Steel Guitar and Orchestra is the first documented concerto written for the solo pedal steel guitar, composed by Michael A. Levine. It was premiered on April 16, 2005, by the Nashville Chamber Orchestra, with Gary Morse (of Dierks Bentley's and Dwight Yoakam's bands) as soloist and Paul Gambill conducting. Other performances include play on Radio New Zealand and performance in the North Carolina Symphony's New Year's Eve Concert in 2005.

== Sections ==
Section 1 (7:29)
Section 2 (4:21)
Section 3 (5:41)
