= Served Like a Girl =

- Theatrical release poster
- Directed by: Lysa Heslov
- Written by: Tchavdar Georgiev; Lysa Heslov
- Produced by: Seth Gordon
- Cinematography: Rita Baghdadi
- Edited by: Tchavdar Georgiev; Bridget Arnet; Monique Zavistovski
- Music by: Michael A. Levine
- Production company: Lagralane Group
- Release date: August 25, 2017
- Running time: 103 minutes
- Country: United States
- Language: English

Served Like a Girl is a 2017 documentary film about the lives of female United States military veterans as they compete for the crown of Ms. Veteran America, directed by Lysa Heslov. The film was produced by Seth Gordon.

== Soundtrack ==
The film's soundtrack was produced by Linda Perry and Kerry Brown featuring songs from Pat Benatar, Christina Aguilera, Pink, Gwen Stefani. Natasha Bedingfield, Dorothy and Little Mix.
