= Scrapstore =

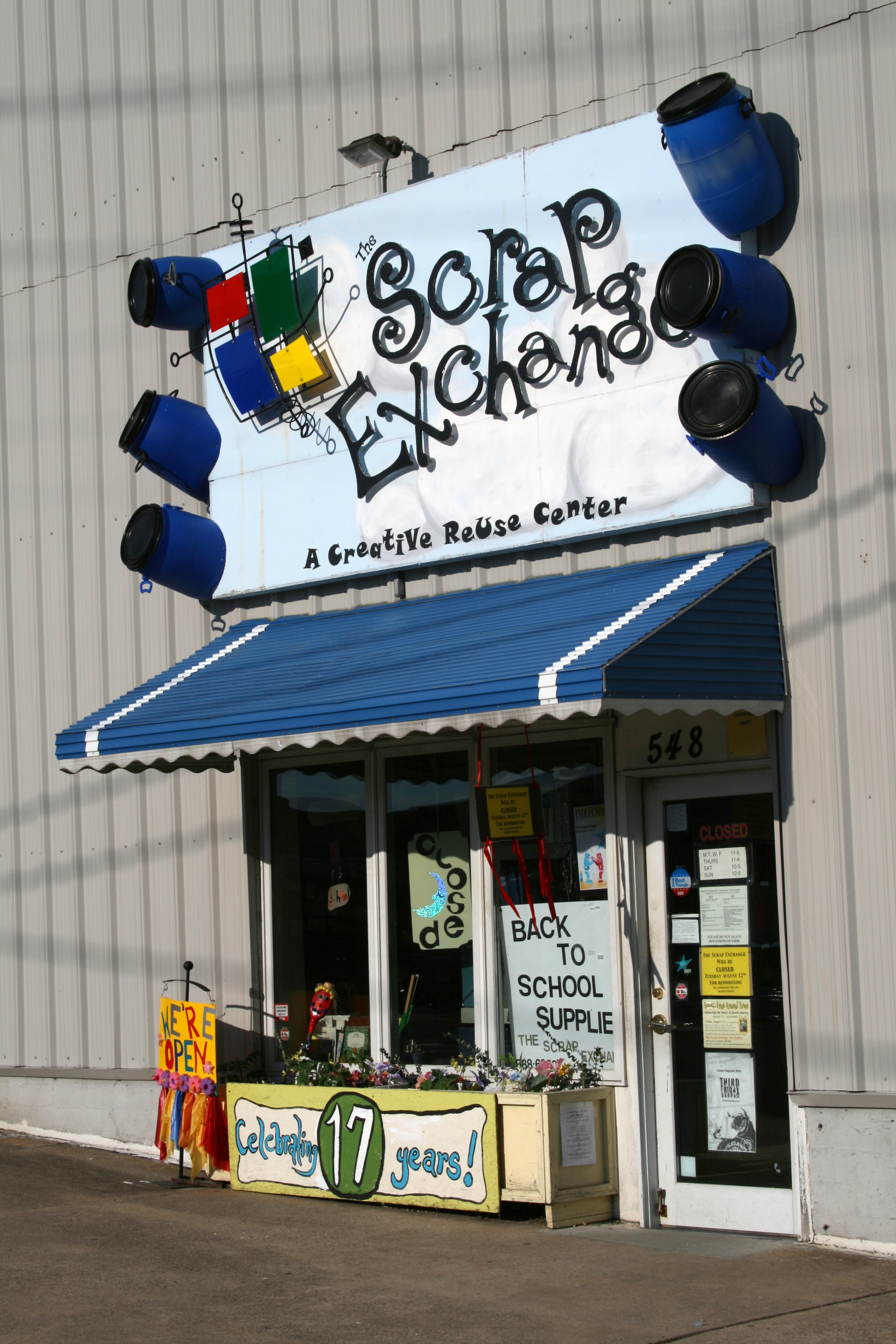
The Scrap Exchange, a scrapstore in Durham, North Carolina.

A scrapstore or scrap store is a particular type of organization centered upon the principle of re-use and may be operated as for profit or not for profit. The basic operational principle of all Scrapstores is the same, although their business models may differ significantly. The terms Scrapstore and Creative Reuse can be used interchangeably although Scrapstore is preferred in the UK and Creative Reuse is often used in the USA

== Basic principle ==
Scrapstores operate by taking re-usable, safe, clean waste products (‘scrap’) and re-distributing it. Usually these materials come from local industries and are donated, although there is a cost to the scrapstore in terms of collection and sorting etc. The benefit to the businesses is that they are getting rid of material that they would normally pay to dispose of and that they are seen to play a part in their local community. Being significantly different from scrapyards, the re-use element tends to be dominated by art and craft activities – often aimed at those working with young children - but items may also be used in do-it-yourself or other activities. It is also common for scrapstores to trade in new art and craft products to complement the sale of scrap.

== Business models ==
Some scrapstores operate as charities, with the provision of re-use items to local schools and playgroups as their core aim. Others operate as social enterprises, with reduction of landfill and provision of re-use items being part of their triple bottom line and with profit being used to support a charity, or another social aim.

The most visible difference between the two business models is one of access and price structure.

The charitable model as outlined by Children's Scrapstore tends towards closed membership and restricted access. They are frequently funded, specifically to provide materials to particular groups within their community and access is restricted to these groups. The groups usually pay an annual membership fee, which may fluctuate based on the size and location of the group. They usually then make another volume related payment each time they take away scrap material. Access may be limited to a certain number of visits per month, a certain volume of scrap or there may be limits on particularly desirable items in order to give all members an opportunity to access them.

The social enterprise model as outlined by Unique Scrapstore tends to be more recognizable as a business. Such stores will tend to have a more defined pricing structure and lower membership fees. There still tends to be a focus on customers who work with young children, (including discount schemes or free items) but such stores are more likely to be open to the public as well. (some scrapstores also offer on-line or mail order services) Social enterprise based scrapstores will tend to have clear, measurable re-use targets incorporated into their triple bottom line.

== Scrap swaps ==
Whilst the UK scrap stores (approximately 90) are all separate organizations, they do work together to use large volumes of scrap that arise from specific companies or events. Additionally scrap stores who collect surplus specific materials from their own area swap their excess with other scrap stores from other areas to ensure variety for their members and maximum reuse potential.

== Workshops ==
In addition to providing re-use items, some ScrapStore stores also provide an outreach provision in the form of workshops where participants can demonstrate examples of ways in which they can put ‘reducing, reusing and recycling’ into practice in a shared environment and have a better understanding of their commitment to improving the environment; the local economy; and society by reducing waste in landfill.

As part of the 2017, UK City of Culture Celebrations, the ScrapStore in Hull offered a series of educational craft workshops set in a pretend factory environment designed to inspire families to make a difference to their community through increased environmental awareness.

== Awards ==
Worcestershire Resource Exchange, which run a scrapstore, has been recognised with a Queen's Award for Voluntary Service by Deputy Lord-Lieutenant Andrew Duncan.
