= Solomon B. Levine =

American economist

Solomon Bernard Levine (August 10, 1920 – October 3, 2006) was one of the U.S.'s foremost experts on Japanese labor and industrial relations.

== Biography ==
Levine's book "Industrial Relations in Postwar Japan", published in 1958, was considered to be a landmark in the field, influencing a generation of Asian scholars. His deep knowledge and interest in Japan came long before the 1980s explosion in interest and writing about the rapid growth and success of the Japanese economy and employment system. Levine's book then became the classic reference that everyone working on these topics were told to read.

Levine was a naval intelligence officer in World War II and learned to speak Japanese as part of the war effort. While in the language program, he met his wife, Betty, also a naval intelligence officer. Levine was part of the Okinawa landing and, later, the occupation of Japan. While serving in the occupation, Levine developed a fascination with Japanese culture that was to last the rest of his life. Still in Naval intelligence, he served as a translator for a Japanese admiral who had helped design the battleship Yamato.

After the service, Levine received a BA and MBA from Harvard and a Phd. in Economics from MIT. He was then hired as an assistant professor at the University of Illinois and began to do research on Japanese labor relations. His department head warned, "no one would ever be interested in" his chosen field. Eventually, Levine became the Director of the Asian Studies Center at the Univ. of Illinois and, later, Chairman of the East Asian Studies program and professor of industrial relations and international business at the University of Wisconsin–Madison.

Although widely respected, Levine's work often ran counter to accepted truisms on the subject. For example, Japan's postwar boom was often attributed to an extraordinarily loyal and docile workforce. Levine showed that Japanese workers in the 1950s were actually just as likely to strike as American ones. And he contended that the supposed cradle-to-grave job security offered by Japanese corporations was a myth, long before the economic decline of the 90s demonstrated this on a widespread basis. He noted, correctly, that life-time security was afforded at best one third of the male labor force. It did not extend to those working outside of large firms in smaller manufacturing supplier firms, those over the age of 55, women, and those in the service sector.

Levine's work was widely acclaimed by other Japanese and international scholars and experts for its rich understanding of the Japanese culture, institutions, and history. He attracted to the University of Illinois, and then to the University of Wisconsin, many Japanese students who went on to take up faculty positions in leading Japanese universities and to become top advisors of Japanese government leaders. Much of this came from the time he and his wife lived and studied in Japan and from the knowledge he gained from the wide array of Japanese scholars, students, and professionals with whom he interacted. Noted industrial relations expert, Thomas Anton Kochan, wrote, “Unlike much of the more superficial writing about the Japanese ‘model’ of labor and employment relations that appeared during the peak of its success and popularity, Levine's work and depiction of industrial relations in Japan has stood the test of time well."

== Partial bibliography ==
Industrial Relations in Postwar Japan by Solomon B. Levine

Human Resources in Japanese Industrial Development by Solomon B. Levine and Hisashi Kawada

The Political Economy of Japan, vol. 3: Cultural and Social Dynamics. (book reviews): An article from: Pacific Affairs by Solomon B. Levine

Inside Japanese Business: A Narrative History, 1960-2000 (Nanzan University Academic Publication Series) by Makoto Ohtsu, Tomio Imanari, and Solomon B. Levine
