= Score! A Concert Celebrating Music Composed for Television =

- Date: May 21, 2014
- Site: Royce Hall, Los Angeles, California
- Hosted by: Jon Burlingame
- Produced by: Michael A. Levine, Mark Watters, Lucas Cantor, Spike Jones Jr.

Score! A Concert Celebrating Music Composed for Television was a live concert sponsored by the Academy of Television Arts and Sciences, which presented iconic and contemporary television music performed by a 65-piece orchestra and a 40-voice choir.

== Program ==
Hosted by noted author and journalist Jon Burlingame, the program included music from over 50 shows including Downton Abbey, House of Cards, The Simpsons, The Walking Dead, Game of Thrones, 24, Glee, The Borgias, Nurse Jackie, Family Guy, Da Vinci's Demons and many others conducted by their composers. A career achievement award was presented to composer Mark Snow (The X-Files, Blue Bloods).

Score! was the brainchild of the Academy's music branch governor Michael A. Levine. Levine, former music branch governor Mark Watters and Lucas Cantor served as executive producers. Spike Jones, Jr. produced and directed.

Sponsors of the event included ASCAP in conjunction with their 100th anniversary, The Guild of Music Supervisors, Cinesamples, The Gorfaine and Schwartz Agency, First Artists Management, The Society of Composers and Lyricists and Varèse Sarabande.

== Concert Summary ==
Television Academy members and guests were treated to performances of various television scores by accomplished composers Sean Callery, Alf Clausen, Jeff Beal, Wendy Melvoin and Lisa Coleman, John Lunn, Walter Murphy, James S. Levine and Bear McCreary, Trevor Morris, Ramin Djawadi and Mark Snow.

Unlike previous Academy television music concerts, notably two at the Hollywood Bowl, the show focused almost entirely on current or recent program music, spotlighting suites created by composers especially for the concert. An opening video of theme-music clips from nearly 90 classic TV shows led seamlessly into a live medley of main titles from 24 contemporary series, which was arranged by 6-time Emmy winner Mark Watters. Shows featured in the medley included Game of Thrones, Mad Men, Copper, The Amazing Race, Survivor, Parks and Recreation, Curb Your Enthusiasm, The Americans, Modern Family and Veep.

Sean Callery conducted his theme for The Kennedys and, in a send-off video before the performance of Callery's 24 theme, Kiefer Sutherland complained that Callery did not get enough time in the Score! show, and Mary Lynn Rajskub said, “Sean Callery has won enough awards – how about one for me?"

Actor Tim Daly presented Mark Snow — who happens to be Daly's brother-in-law — with the Music Peer Group Career Achievement Award, in recognition of the composer's prolific and diverse 30-year career. Snow then conducted suites from Millennium and The X-Files.

Other highlights included a surprise band of zombies emerged from the audience, attacked The Walking Dead composer Bear McCreary onstage as he was conducting his suite, then dragged him screaming offstage. And a rousing sword fight broke out between medieval-costumed warriors between Trevor Morris' The Borgias suite and Ramin Djawadi's Game of Thrones theme.

== Critical reception ==
Score! was met with critical acclaim. Tim Appelo of The Hollywood Reporter stated that "The sold-out, 1800-member audience repeatedly leaped to its feet in standing ovations as the simple, yet intricate, music of 11 TV composers burst forth with a grandeur and sonic fidelity you can’t get at home." Jon Burlingame of Variety noted that "The immediate sellout of this event tells us what we suspected – that music for television is not just ‘background,’ or ‘underscore,’ as it's often referred to – but rather an integral part of the storytelling experience, a critical factor in creating mood, setting the pace, reminding us of the place and the people and most of all, conveying the emotion that is ultimately the reason we keep tuning in."

"It's said we are in the second Golden Age of television. But I think this is the Platinum Age and music is its emotional beating heart. There has never been such a confluence of so many great programs - and great scores - in the history of our medium. This concert showcases a small sampling of this outstanding work," said composer and executive producer Michael A. Levine.
