= Recycled Orchestra of Cateura =

Paraguayan children's orchestra

- Orchestra
- Native name: Orquesta de Instrumentos Reciclados de Cateura
- Short name: Recycled Orchestra
- Founded: 2012
- Location: Cateura, Paraguay
- Website: www.recycledorchestracateura.com

The Recycled Orchestra of Cateura (Spanish: Orquesta de Instrumentos Reciclados de Cateura), also known as the Recycled Orchestra, is an orchestra composed of children from Asunción, Paraguay who play musical instruments made from scrap materials collected from Asunción's Cateura landfill. Formed in 2012, the orchestra has performed internationally with Stevie Wonder and the American heavy-metal bands Metallica and Megadeth.

== History ==
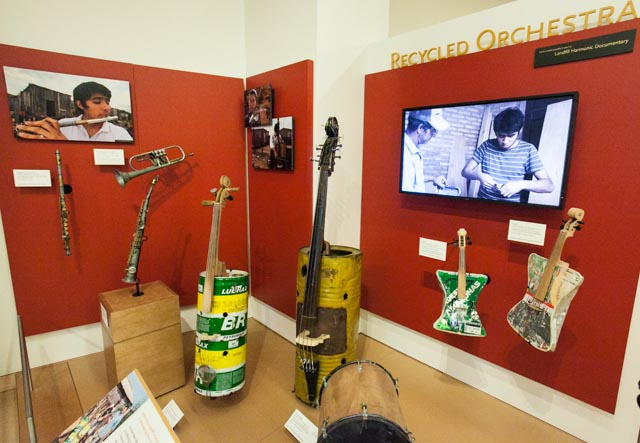
Instruments made from recycled materials for the Recycled Orchestra. (exhibited at Musical Instrument Museum, Phoenix)

=== Early years ===
The orchestra originated in the "Sonidos de la Tierra" (Sounds of the Earth) program (created and directed since 2002 by Luis Szarán) and Procicla a recycling project of the Alter Vida NGO. Szarán founded the Sonidos de Cateura (Sounds of Cateura) music school on July 7, 2006, and its first workshop, sponsored by the geAm NGO to build recycled instruments, was held on May 24, 2007 luthier Carlos Uliambre. Sounds of the Earth is sponsored by Tierra Nuestra.

The music school began with the recyclers' children after Szarán donated ten guitars bought with proceeds from a tribute he received at Salemma Mall. A group of children between 8 and 12 years old from the Sounds of Cateura school was presented at the regional seminary of Youth Orchestras of Sounds of the Earth in Acahay (103 kilometers from Asunción) on December 2, 2006. They also performed at the eighth Sounds of the Earth festival and national youth-orchestra seminar in Coronel Oviedo on January 31, 2007.

Former Cateura recyclers worked in the Sounds of the Earth luthier workshop, and delivered the first batch of 20 guitars made from recycled wood on September 20, 2007; the guitars were donated to distant locations. A "Stradivarius de Cateura", a violin made from an old pan, a fork and other objects recycled from the Cateura landfill, was presented in Germany on November 6 of that year.

=== First ensemble and tours ===
The first group of Sounds of the Earth musicians with recycled instruments made their debut at the former Sheldonian Theater in Oxford, England as part of the Skoll Foundation's World Forum of Social Entrepreneurs on March 26, 2008. They appeared with Szarán, harpist Richard Yua Zalazar, flutist Juan Gerardo Ayala, cellist Juan Chávez (coordinator of Carapeguá's Sounds of the Earth school), violinist Juan Eugenio Benítez and saxophonist Arturo Benítez from Carapeguá. After that concert, the quintet became known as the Ensemble of Recycled Instruments Oxford.

In October 2008, a Sounds of the Earth delegation first brought children from Cateura to international concerts in Argentina. The group played in the province of Santa Fe and at the eighth Youth Orchestra Encounter in Buenos Aires' Luna Park stadium with the Ensemble of Recycled Instruments Oxford. The Orchestra of Recycled Instruments joined the Weltweite Klänge world orchestra on a European tour directed by Szarán, presenting nine successful concerts in Switzerland, Austria and Germany the following month.

The project was renamed the Orchestra of The Recycled Instruments of Sounds of the Earth in 2009. Composed of young people from different communities who played instruments made from recycled material in the Cateura Luteria Workshop, they presented several concerts in Paraguay. The orchestra played a program entitled "Melodies From Garbage" in 35 concerts in Austria, Germany and Switzerland in November of that year. A violin built with materials from the Cateura landfill became part of the Dimitri Foundation's Musical Instruments Museum in Verscio, Switzerland. In December 2009, the Recycled Orchestra of Sounds of the Earth received the Tomás Moro Award from Our Lady of the Assumption University's Tomás Moro Institute.

The orchestra, directed by Szarán, performed concerts in Genoa as part of the city's March 2010 Paraguayan Days. Szarán then gave a TED talk in Costa Rica. In May 2010, the orchestra again toured Germany and Switzerland.

The Sounds of the Earth project toured Paraguay for the country's independence bicentennial in May 2011, and the group has played in Lisbon, London, Hamburg and Berlin. The Orchestra of Recycled Instruments was featured in a BBC report and by CNN, EFE and AFP. In August 2011, the orchestra toured Spain and performed a concert for Pope Benedict XVI for World Youth Day (WYD) in Madrid.

=== Breakup ===
In October 2011, Sounds of the Earth announced on its Facebook page that Orchestra of Recycled Instruments coordinator Favio Chávez had left the program. Chávez announced the formation of the Recycled, with Sounds of the Earth musicians from Carapeguá and Cateura playing recycled instruments, two months later.

An 11-minute preview of the upcoming film Landfill Harmonic was released in March 2012. Filmed in mid-2010, it featured Luis Szarán, former coordinator Favio Chávez and young violinist María Eugenia Benítez, flutist Juan Gerardo "Liquí" Ayala and cellist Juan Manuel Chávez (Chávez' nephew).

On June 15, 2012, Szarán directed the Orchestra of Recycled Instruments of Cateura of Sounds of the Earth for the last time in Rio de Janeiro at the Forum of Social Entrepreneurship in the New Economy, part of the United Nations Conference on Sustainable Development (Rio + 20). A week later, Chávez announced that he would manage the project in Cateura and the Recycled's first concert in Panama. The new orchestra appeared at Colombia's international Bogotá Basura Cero (where they were initially invited as part of Sounds of the Earth) in November of that year.

=== Ensemble H2O ===
Sounds of the Earth introduced Ensemble H2O, with instruments made with recycled materials, to increase awareness of the importance of water. The new group appeared in a September 26, 2012 concert by Paraguayan guitarist Berta Rojas and Cuban musician Paquito D'Rivera as part of the "Traces of Mangoré" tour. On November 19 of that year, Ensemble H2O performed at the American Music Awards in Los Angeles.

== Landfill Harmonic ==
On October 24, 2012, a three-minute trailer for Landfill Harmonic was released on Vimeo with no mention of Sounds of the Earth or director Luis Szarán. Paraguayan executive film producer Alejandra Amarilla worked with a team of filmmakers to record a short video about the Recycled Orchestra to raise enough money through Kickstarter for a full-length documentary; the crowdfunding campaign was successful, and eventually resulted in the film. It was shortlisted for the Environmental Award at the 2015 Sheffield Doc/Fest, where it received a special mention.

Landfill Harmonic originally recognized the contribution of Sounds of the Earth from 2006 to 2012: "When Favio Chávez and Luis Szarán came to Cateura to start a music school, they realized that they had more students than instruments. Thanks to the resourcefulness of Cola, a Cateurian garbage picker, an orchestra came together, now featuring violins, cellos, and other instruments artfully put together from trash. Los Reciclados de Cateura, now an independent orchestra, recently performed in Brazil and Colombia under Chávez’s direction". The original video attracted international attention; the Recycled Orchestra received a Prince Claus Award, given to "individuals, groups and organisations whose cultural actions have a positive impact on the development of their societies", in May 2013. According to the award,

[It is] a youth orchestra that is transforming lives. It is unique in its ingenious use of humble local resources and a beacon of pride and hope for the local community ... Orquesta de Instrumentos Reciclados Cateura is honoured for bringing music and joy to many people; for their innovative and communal collaboration in using the resources at hand to create possibilities and transcend their difficult circumstances; for engendering self-esteem, community pride and social cohesion through musical expression; and for showing that culture is a human necessity and that material poverty need not be an obstacle to a life rich in culture.

The Recycled Orchestra joined Megadeth for a performance of "Symphony of Destruction" in August 2013, and appeared with Metallica the following March in Bogotá. In 2014, the orchestra also appeared on Basement Jaxx' "Power to the People". NPR's Anastasia Tsioulcas described the Recycled Orchestra's instruments in September 2016:

"[violins made from] cans, wooden spoons and bent forks. One of the ensemble's cellos uses an oil drum for its body. String pegs are created from detritus like old cooking utensils and even the heel of a worn-out women's shoe. Drum heads are made from old X-ray film, held in place with copious amounts of packing tape. Fifteen-year-old Tobias Armoa plays a saxophone made out of a drainpipe, melted copper, coins, spoon handles, cans and bottle caps."

The orchestra is the subject of Ada's Violin: The Story of the Recycled Orchestra of Paraguay (an illustrated children's book), and was the subject of a January 2017 BBC Radio 4 documentary by Wyre Davies.

== Harmony of Cateura ==
In March 2013, Favio Chávez founded Harmony of Cateura with four parents of members of the Orchestra of Recycled Instruments of Cateura: Jorge Ríos (president), Carmen Cabrera (vice president), Patricia Aranda (treasurer) and Dionicia Espínola (secretary). Former recycler Nicolás Gómez, known as Don Colá, became a luthier with the aid of Sounds of the Earth. Harmony of Cateura, founded to administer donations to the orchestra, acquired the music school's present Cateura location in June 2014. By the end of 2015, Chávez began disbanding Harmony of Cateura after an increasing number of requests for accountability and transparency of the donations (which were being managed in his personal bank account).

== Controversy ==
After the Recycled Orchestra of Cateura's success, director Favio Chavez told The Guardian: "The idea is now available for anyone. This is something that could be replicated in any part of the world where they have similar circumstances. It can be an inspiration for music to be part of the community where there are not the resources". Similar musical organizations have been formed in Brazil, Burundi, Ecuador, Mexico, Panama, and Spain.

In May 2016, an original member of the orchestra and two members of its parents' association (who helped build the school's present building) filed a complaint with the Office of the Prosecutor against Chavez for his alleged lack of transparency. The complaint was supported by three Paraguayan senators.

With Juan Rojas and Félix Azcona (president and vice-president of the second parents' association), Chávez announced the provisional dismissal of the case for alleged breach of trust (requested by fiscal agent Stella Mary Cano on September 1, 2017) on December 7 of that year. On a Radio Ñandutí program, Chávez said that the baseless smear campaign was conducted by legislators and a La Nación reporter.

The accusers were notified of the dismissal on December 7, and an appeal was filed on December 13. On April 3, 2018, the Court of Appeals overturned the dismissal and returned the case to the Criminal Court of Guarantees No. 7. In the appeal, the accusers said that the dismissal was based on a single report by an accountant hired by the defendant.
