= Luis Szarán =

Paraguayan musician (born 1953)

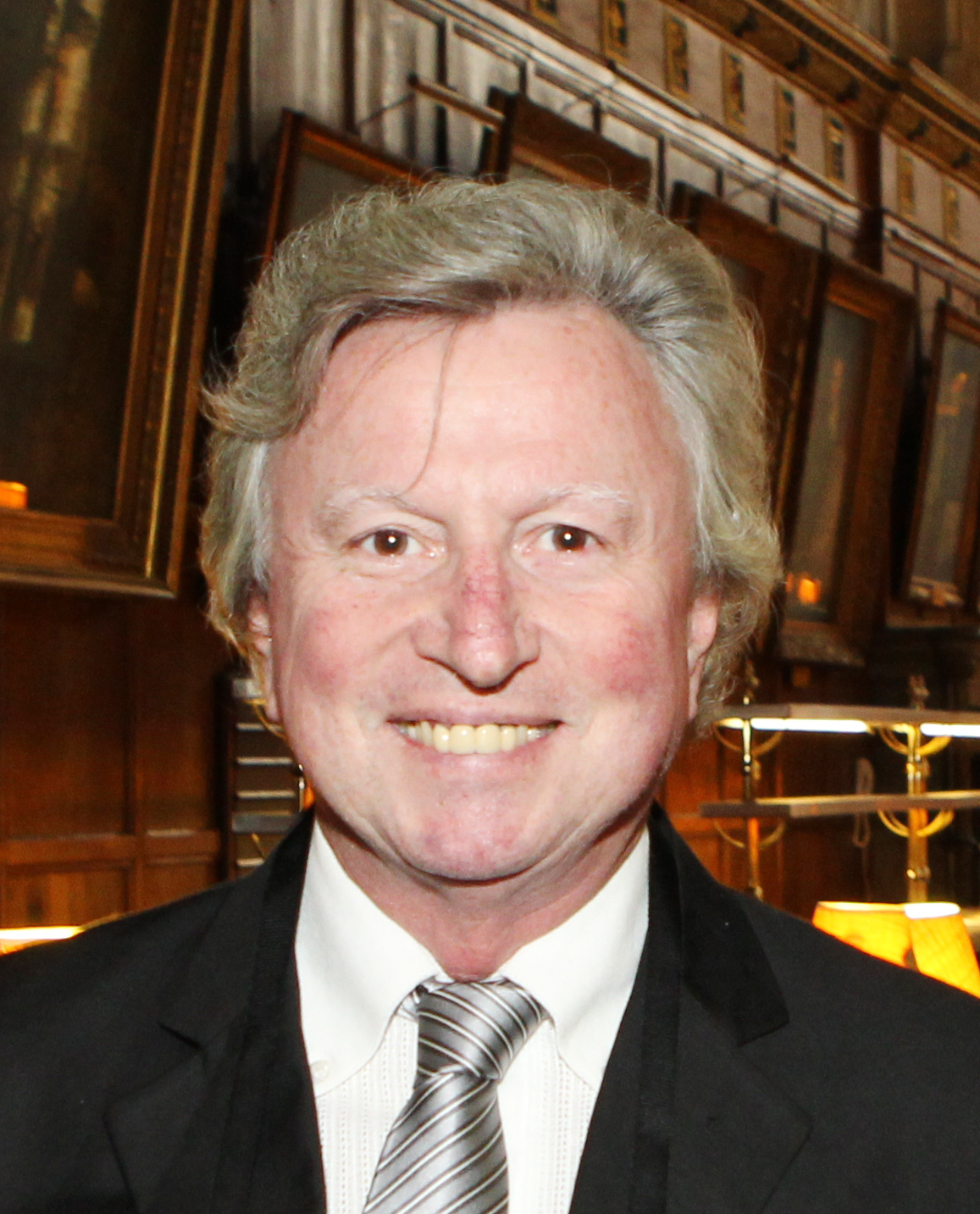
- Luis Szarán in 2011
- Born: Luis Szarán; 24 September 1953 (age 72); Encarnación, Paraguay
- Known for: Musician, composer, orchestra director
- Notable work: "Meditación por la caída del Muro de Berlin para violín o violoncello y cuerdas" "Preludio Sinfónico" "Impresiones del Chaco: Chaidi"
- Awards: Honored by the Italian government with the title of Official Knight of the Republic
- Website: http://www.luisszaran.org

Luis Szarán (born 24 September 1953) is a Paraguayan musician, orchestra director, composer and musical researcher; since 2002, founder and director of the social and community integration program "Sounds of the Earth", which created the school of music where began the Recycled Orchestra of Cateura.

Since 1978, he has been conducting the Symphony Orchestra of the City of Asunción (OSCA, in Spanish means "Orquesta Sinfónica de la Ciudad de Asunción"), which he has held since 1990; and the Phylomusica Orchestra of Asunción. He has also directed plays of his own in numerous international festivals and has obtained the National Award of Music, given by the National Parliament in 1997.

== Childhood and youth ==
Szarán was born in Encarnación, Itapúa, in Paraguay, on 24 September 1953. He studied music with the teacher José Luis Miranda in Asunción.

In 1975 Szarán obtained a scholarship to master his studies in Italy, given by the Italian government. He studied orchestra direction in the Santa Cecilia Conservatory, in Rome. His teachers were Massimo Pradella, Piero Bellugi and Mario Migliardi. Later on, he took courses of improvement in the Colón Theater, in Buenos Aires, Argentina, with teacher Hans Swarowsky. In 1977 he continued his education in Chigiana de Sierra Academy and the Instituto Francesco Canneti de Vicenza.

== Career ==
Szarán's work have been published in books. Some of his work is about Native-American music and Paraguayan popular music; also transcriptions of the music in the Jesuit Missions. Since 1989, he had been the director of the Paraguayan Area for the Spanish Hispanic-American Encyclopedic Dictionary of Music, organized by the Author General Society of Spain, SGAE.

Szarán's compositions have been presented at the Festival de Música Contemporánea de Ouro Preto in Brazil, in 1975 and 1978; Encuentro de Compositores de Latinoamérica in Santiago, Chile 1988 and 1989, in Belo Horizonte, Brazil in 1989, and in Buenos Aires in 1990. His piece "Variaciones en Puntas" for winds quintet was presented in the Youth International Festival of Beyreuth, Germany during the closing concert. It was also presented in the São Paulo's Musica Nova Festival.

On 6 December 2016, at UNESCO Headquarters in Paris (France), Szarán received the recognition "Artist for Peace of UNESCO" for the Orchestra H2O Sounds of the Earth.

On 4 May 2017, the Symphony Orchestra of the City of Asuncion (OSCA) presented at the Municipal Theater of Asunción the world premiere of the oratorio "The bronze arch", which Szarán composed 40 years ago, with a text by the journalist Jesus Ruiz Nestosa.

On 6 October 2017, the label Klanglogo publishes the album "Jungle Baroque" by Szarán, as director of the orchestra "Sounds of Paraquaria".

== Work ==
Year	Work
1973	Preludio Sinfonico (Symphonic Preamble)
1973	Las Musarañas, for winds
1975	Sonata for violin and piano
1975	Pequeña Suite (Small Suite), for violin and strings
1975	Trozos (Pieces), for strings
1976	Añesú, for narrator, choir and orchestra
1978	Sonata for piano
1979	El Río (The River), for contralto and instrumental band
1983	Tríptico Barrettiano (about texts of Rafael Barrett), for Chamber Orchestra
1985	Encarnaciones, suite for piano
1985	Concertino, for guitar, flute and strings
1986	Variaciones en Puntas, for wind quintet (National Award of Music in 1997)
1989	Mbocapú, for symphonic orchestra
1990	Miniaturas (miniatures), for oboe and piano
1992	Meditación por la caída del Muro de Berlín (Meditation for the fall of the Berlin Wall), for violin or violoncello and strings
1992	La Magdalena, for trombone and symphonic orchestra
1997	Rastros (Traces), for flute and piano
1998	Concertino, for violin and symphonic orchestra
2001	La Cruz del Sur (The South Cross), for soprano, violin, clavichord and strings
2007	Chaidi: los últimos sonidos (Chaidi: the last sounds), for flute, piano and strings

== Sounds of the Earth ==
This project is directed towards the kids and young people, and was created by Szarán, who through the music schools, bands and cultural associations, gives access to musical education to 3.000 people of scarce resources, in 72 communities in the interior of the country.

The program is inspired in the concept of "education for the art"; it was initiated in 2002 with the support of the AVINA Foundation, expanding it with alliances with other organizations like; the National Parliament, FONDEC, ITAIPU Bi-National, Asuncion's Philharmonic Society, the Embassies of Germany, United States, France and Italy, Partners of the Americans (Paraguay-Kansas), Culture Direction of Asunción Municipality and others. More than 100 organizations, municipalities, business and sponsors are involved.

In 2005, Szarán was awarded with the Skoll Awards for The Social Entrepreneurships, given by the Skoll Foundation of California (USA). This award made possible to expand the project to other sector of society in need. The same year Sounds from my land was included as a program of Fundación Tierranuestra.

On 16 May 2011, Szarán conducted the Paraguayan Bicentennial Chamber Orchestra, a musical ensemble brought together to celebrate the 200th Anniversary of the Independence of the Republic of Paraguay. The orchestra comprised leading members of the City of Asunción Symphony Orchestra, The National Symphony Orchestra, plus some young musicians from the Sounds of the Earth Project. The program offered an overview of Paraguay's compositions from the 19th century to the present, and included works in a variety of styles. The celebrations were held at Church House, near Westminster Abbey, London, and the event was hosted by Miguel Solano-Lopez, Ambassador representing Paraguay in London.

== Awards ==
Year	Work
1974	Honored by the Italian government with the title of Official Knight of the Republic, and a scholarship.
1975	Was named Outstanding Young Man by the Junior Camera of Asunción, Paraguay. Won the award Los 12 del año (The top 12 of the year) four times by Radio Station Primero de Marzo, Paraguay.
1987	Honor to the Cultural Merit by the Rotary Club of Encarnación, Paraguay. The French Alliance seat in Asunción founded the first Library of Music in Paraguay after him. Award of gratitude from the Philharmonic Society of Asunción, Paraguay.
1992	Annual Award from the Friends of Arts Association, Paraguay.
1993	Selected among the 8 most successful Paraguayan people, along with other personalities such as Augusto Roa Bastos, José Luis Chilavert and others. Workers' National Bank, Paraguay.
1993	Best Director. Radio Station Curupayty, Paraguay.
1994	Official Knight of the Italian Republic, from the Italian Government for his research and international projection of life and work of Domenico Zipoli, musician in the Jesuit Missions in Paraguay.
1995	Silver Medal in acknowledge to the professional efficiency. Granted by the Municipality of Asunción, Paraguay.
1996	Selected among the 8 most successful Paraguayan people, along with other personalities such as Augusto Roa Bastos, José Luis Chilavert and others. Workers' National Bank, Paraguay.
1997	National Award of Music, received for the first time in Paraguay from the National Parliament.
2000	Received in Rome, the distinction "International Award to the Culture" from the International Lions Club Prato Datini in Italy.
2001	He received the medal UNESCO "Orbis Guaraniticus".
2002	He was the first Latin American composer and fifth in the world to receive the "Vivaldi Medal" given in the International Festival of Venice and the "Franz Xaver" Medal from the Jesuit Legal of Germany in acknowledgement of his work in the care and diffusion of the musical culture of the Jesuit Missions in South America. He was acknowledged as "Honorary Citizen" of the cities: Yuty, Caaguazú, Encarnación and Asunción, in Paraguay, and of Limana, in Veneto, Italy. He holds the Order of Arts and Literature of the Ministry of Culture in France.
2004	Acknowledge as Academic of the Paraguayan Academy of History.
2005	Awarded with the International Prize from the Skoll Foundation of California (United States) for his character of social enterprising and was distinguished as Member in the Spanish Royal Academy of History.
2008	"Masters of Art", awarded by the Cultural Center of the Republic "El Cabildo", National Congress of Paraguay.
2008	Prize "Leaders of Paraguay" (Leader in Culture), of the American University of Asunción.
2010	Featured figure in the gallery of "Architects of Peace".
2012	Honorary title of "Tourist Ambassador", granted by the National Secretariat of Tourism (Senatur) of Paraguay.
2012	"Doctor Honoris Causa" of the National University of the East (UNE), Paraguay.
2013	National Order for Merit "Comuneros", granted by the Chamber of Deputies, of the National Congress of Paraguay.
2014	"Doctor Honoris Causa" of the Intercontinental Technological University (UTIC), Paraguay.
2014	World Social Entrepreneur Award from the World Economic Forum, through the Schwab Foundation, from Switzerland.
2016	Award National Order of Merit "Don José Falcón" granted by the Ministry of Foreign Affairs of Paraguay.
2017	"Doctor Honoris Causa" of the National University of Concepción, Paraguay.
