= The Amazing Race 32 =

Season of television series

- Season 32
- Region 1 DVD cover
- Presented by: Phil Keoghan
- No. of teams: 11
- Winners: Will Jardell & James Wallington
- No. of legs: 11
- Distance traveled: 33,000 mi (53,000 km)
- No. of episodes: 12

Release
- Original network: CBS
- Original release: October 14 – December 16, 2020

Additional information
- Filming dates: November 10 – December 3, 2018

Series chronology
- ← Previous; Season 31 Next → Season 33

The Amazing Race 32 is the thirty-second season of the American reality competition show The Amazing Race. Hosted by Phil Keoghan, it featured eleven teams of two, each with a pre-existing relationship, competing in a race around the world to win US$1,000,000. This season visited four continents and eleven countries and traveled over 33,000 miles (53,000 km) during eleven legs. Starting in Los Angeles, racers traveled through Trinidad and Tobago, Colombia, Brazil, Paraguay, France, Germany, Kazakhstan, India, Cambodia, and the Philippines before returning to the United States and finishing in New Orleans. New elements introduced in this season include an elimination during a no-rest leg, a Double Switchback, and the City Sprint. Elements of the show that returned for this season were the Yield and double-length legs, which were renamed Mega Legs. The season premiered on CBS on October 14, 2020, and concluded on December 16, 2020.

Boyfriends Will Jardell and James Wallington were the winners of this season, while married parents Hung Nguyen and Chee Lee finished in second place, and professional volleyball players Riley and Maddison McKibbin finished in third place.

== Format ==
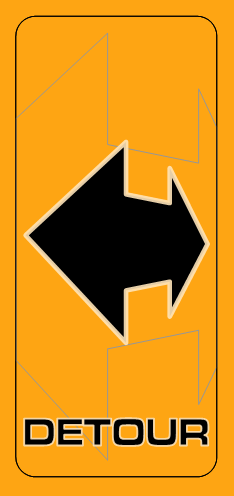
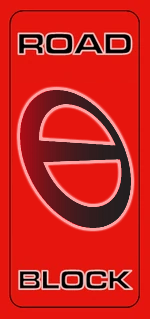
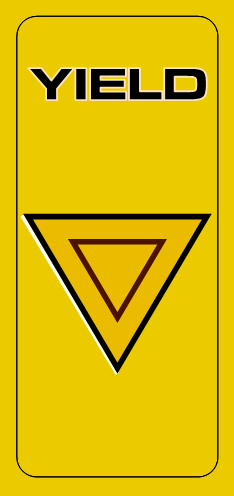
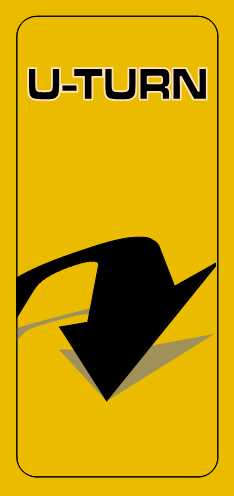
The clues which contestants receive during the course of the race generally fall into five categories: Route Info, Detour, Roadblock, Yield, and U-Turn.

The Amazing Race is a reality television show created by Bertram van Munster and Elise Doganieri, and hosted by Phil Keoghan. The series follows teams of two competing in a race around the world. Each leg of the race requires teams to deduce clues, navigate foreign environments, interact with locals, perform physical and mental challenges, and travel on a limited budget provided by the show. At each stop during the leg, teams receive clues inside sealed envelopes, which fall into one of these categories:

- Route Info: These are simple instructions that teams must follow before they can receive their next clue.
- Detour: A Detour is a choice between two tasks. Teams may choose either task and switch tasks if they find one option too difficult. There is usually one Detour present on each leg.
- Roadblock: A Roadblock is a task that only one team member can complete. Teams must choose which member will complete the task based on a brief clue they receive before fully learning the details of the task. There is usually one Roadblock present on each leg.
- Yield: The Yield allows one team to force another team to stop racing until an hourglass drains.
- U-Turn: The U-Turn allows teams to force another team to complete both options of the Detour before they can continue the race.
- Speed Bump: A penalty for teams who finished in last place on a non-elimination leg. It required the team to complete an additional task in the following leg that only they had to complete.

Most teams who arrive last at the Pit Stop of each leg are progressively eliminated, while the first team to arrive at the finish line in the final episode wins the grand prize of US$1,000,000.

== Contestants ==
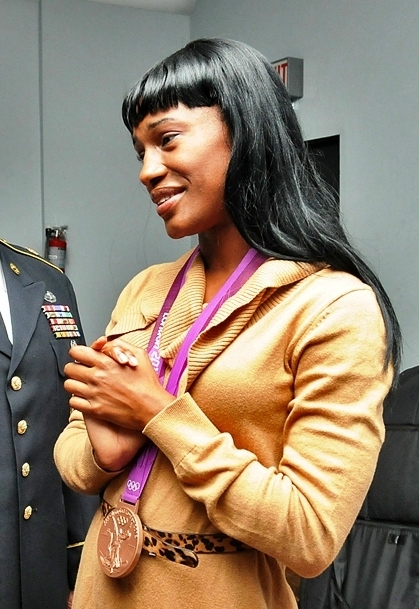
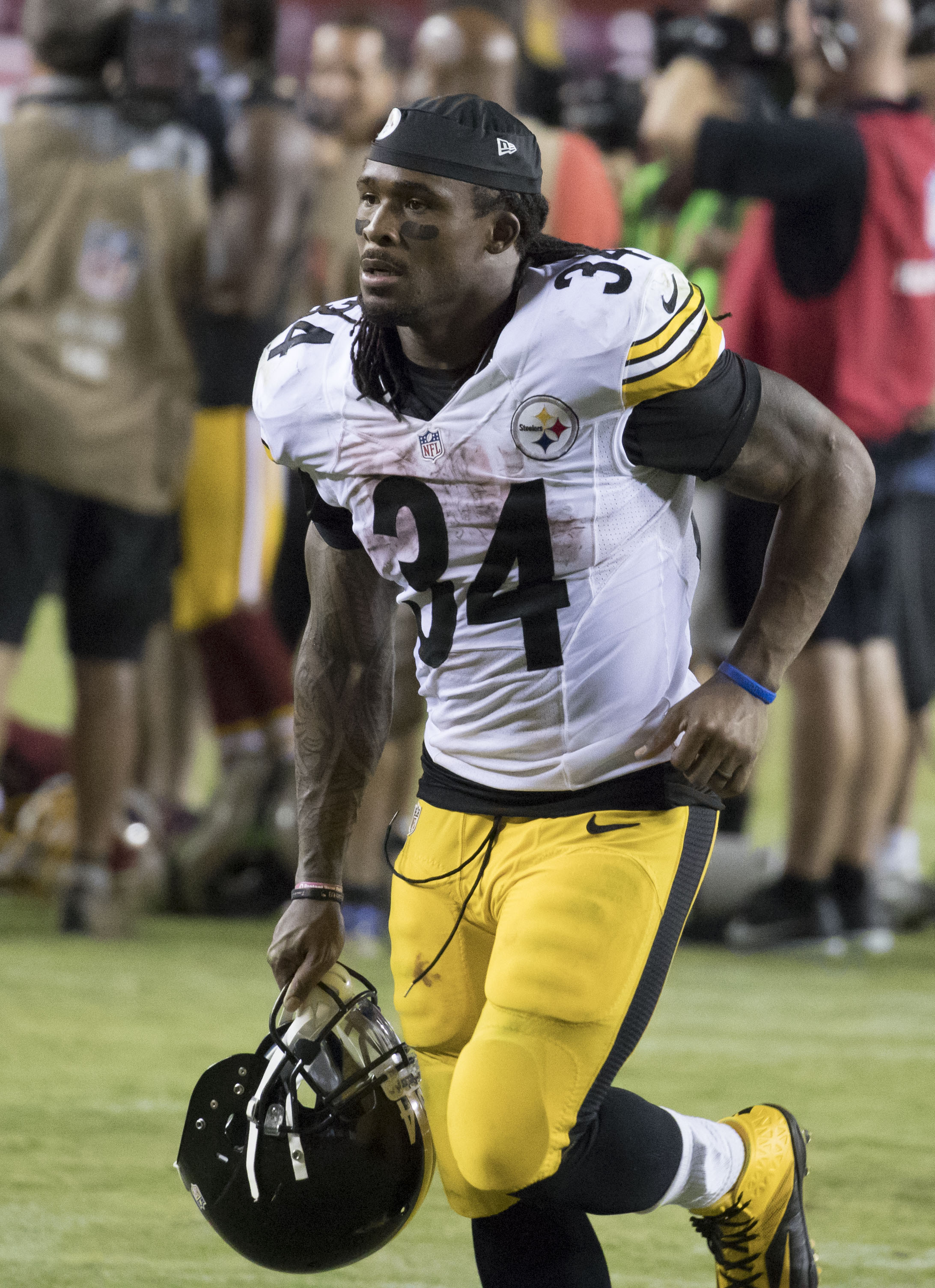
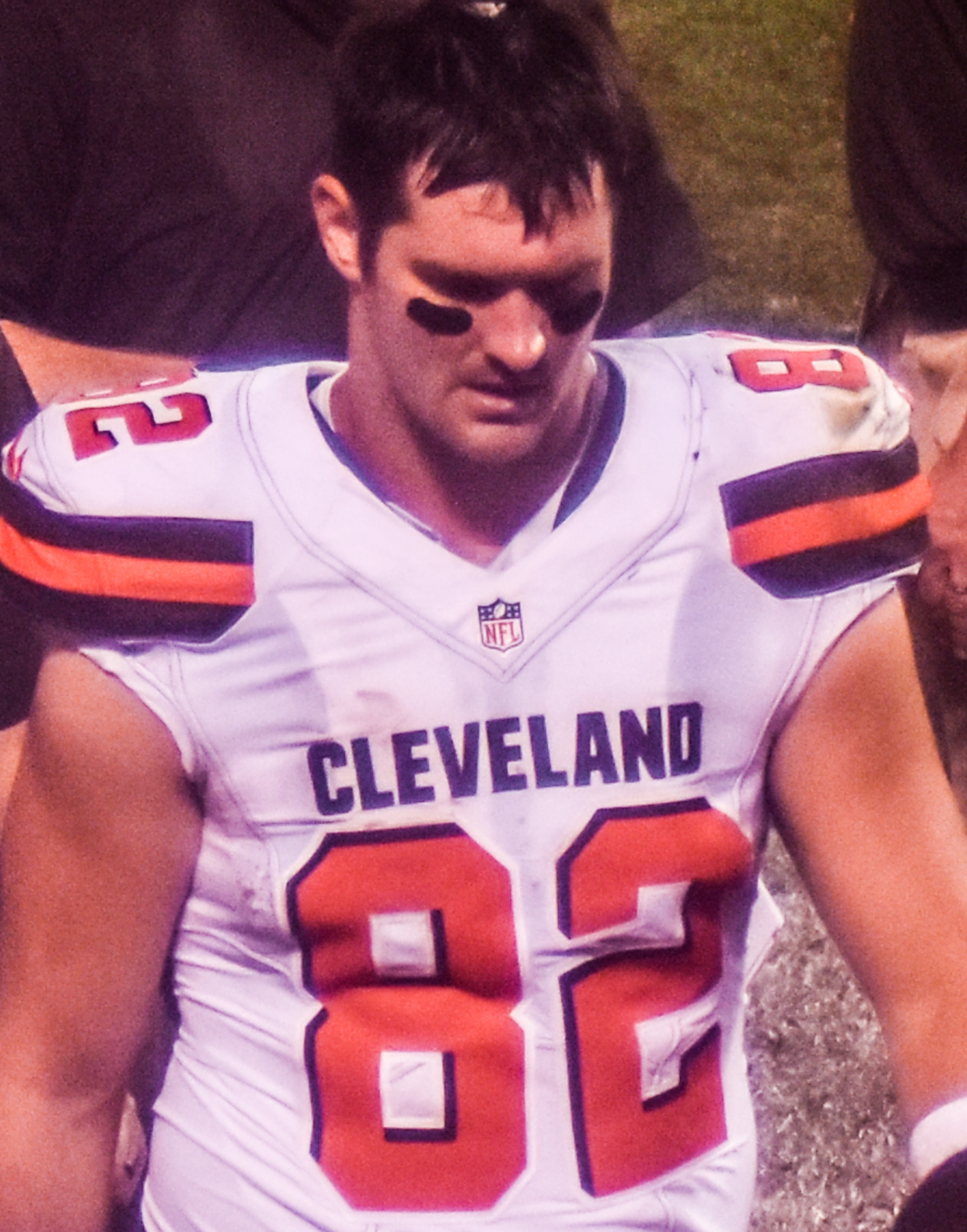
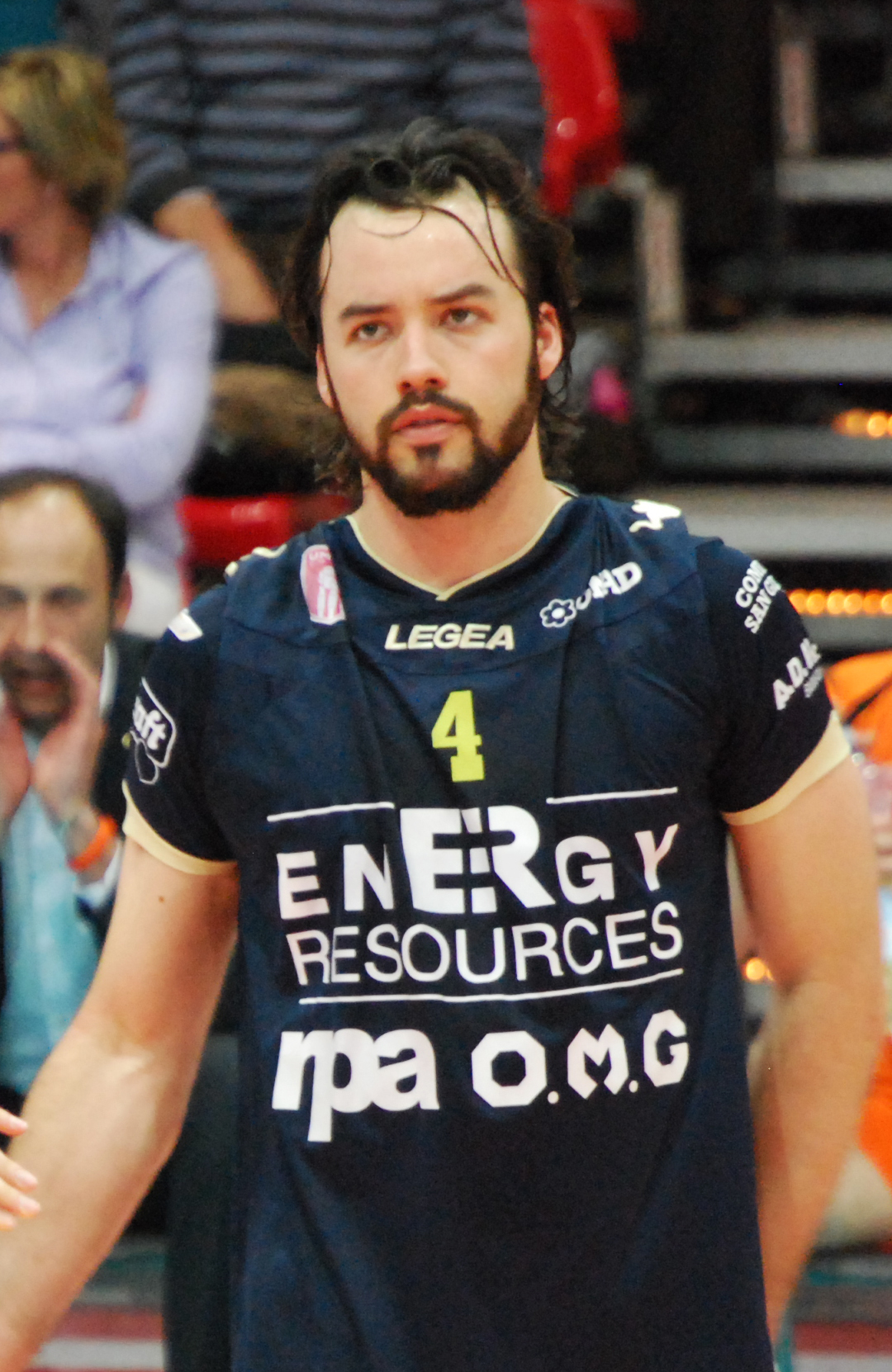
From left to right: Kellie Wells-Brinkley, DeAngelo Williams, Gary Barnidge, and Riley McKibbin

This cast included former Carolina Panthers players DeAngelo Williams and Gary Barnidge, Olympic hurdlers Kellie Wells-Brinkley and LaVonne Idlette, professional volleyball player Riley McKibbin, college basketball coach Jerry Eaves, and America's Next Top Model cycle 21 runner-up Will Jardell.

After Phil Keoghan announced to Will & James that they had won The Amazing Race, Will proposed to James, who accepted. Will & James got married on December 3, 2021: the three year anniversary of their Amazing Race win and engagement.

Contestants	Age	Relationship	Hometown	Status
Nathan Worthington	39	Best Friends	Dayton, Tennessee	Eliminated 1st (in Buccoo, Trinidad and Tobago)
Cody Buell	33	Best Friends	Paint Lick, Kentucky	Eliminated 1st (in Buccoo, Trinidad and Tobago)
Kellie Wells-Brinkley	37	Former Olympic Hurdlers	Richmond, Virginia	Eliminated 2nd (in Bogotá, Colombia)
LaVonne Idlette	34	Former Olympic Hurdlers	Hampton, Virginia	Eliminated 2nd (in Bogotá, Colombia)
Jerry Eaves	61	Father & Son	Louisville, Kentucky	Eliminated 3rd (in Rio Negro, Brazil)
Frank Eaves	25	Father & Son	Louisville, Kentucky	Eliminated 3rd (in Rio Negro, Brazil)
Michelle Newland	34	Sisters	Lafayette, Louisiana	Eliminated 4th (in Paris, France)
Victoria Newland	33	Sisters	Lafayette, Louisiana	Eliminated 4th (in Paris, France)
Leo Brown	31	Dating	Somerville, Massachusetts	Eliminated 5th (in Almaty, Kazakhstan)
Alana Folsom	29	Dating	Somerville, Massachusetts	Eliminated 5th (in Almaty, Kazakhstan)
Kaylynn Williams	30	Sisters	Bluffton, South Carolina	Eliminated 6th (in Hyderabad, India)
Haley Williams	31	Sisters	Bluffton, South Carolina	Eliminated 6th (in Hyderabad, India)
Eswar Dhinakaran	24	Siblings	Fremont, California	Eliminated 7th (in Siem Reap, Cambodia)
Aparna Dhinakaran	26	Siblings	Berkeley, California	Eliminated 7th (in Siem Reap, Cambodia)
DeAngelo Williams	36	Former NFL Stars	Charlotte, North Carolina	Eliminated 8th (in Manila, Philippines)
Gary Barnidge	34	Former NFL Stars	Middleburg, Florida	Eliminated 8th (in Manila, Philippines)
Riley McKibbin	31	Pro Volleyball Brothers	Honolulu, Hawaii	Third place
Maddison McKibbin	29	Pro Volleyball Brothers	Honolulu, Hawaii	Third place
Hung Nguyen	39	Married Parents	Houston, Texas	Runners-up
Chee Lee	38	Married Parents	Houston, Texas	Runners-up
Will Jardell	30	Boyfriends	Nederland, Texas	Winners
James Wallington	31	Boyfriends	Grand Rapids, Michigan	Winners

Future appearances

Will and James appeared on The Amazing Race: 25 Years Around the World.

In 2022, James Wallington competed on the first season of The Challenge: USA. In 2026, Wallington competed on the fifth season of The Floor.

== Contestant progress ==
The following teams are listed with their placements in each leg. Placements are listed in finishing order.

- A red placement with a dagger (†) indicates that the team was eliminated.
- An underlined blue placement with a double-dagger (‡) indicates that the team was the last to arrive at a Pit Stop in a non-elimination leg, and had to perform a Speed Bump in the following leg.
- An italicized placement indicates a team's placement at the midpoint of a Mega Leg.
- A brown > indicates that the team used the Yield and a brown < indicates the team on the receiving end of the Yield.
- A brown ⊃ indicates that the team used the U-Turn and a brown ⊂ indicates the team on the receiving end of the U-Turn.

Team placement (by leg)
Team	1	2	3	4	5	6	7	8a (Note: Leg 8 was a Mega Leg with two Detours, two Roadblocks, and two Yields shown over two episodes. The placements listed for the first half are the order of the teams' completion of the first Roadblock.)	8b	9	10	11
Will & James	4th	6th	1st⊃ (Note: Will & James chose to use the U-Turn on Leo & Alana.)	1st	4th	4th	1st	3rd> (Note: Will & James chose to Yield Kaylynn & Haley during the first half of the Mega Leg.)	2nd	2nd	2nd	1st
Hung & Chee	1st	1st	2nd	6th	2nd	3rd	3rd	4th	4th	3rd	3rd	2nd
Riley & Maddison	3rd	3rd	4th	4th	1st	2nd	2nd	1st	1st> (Note: Riley & Maddison chose to Yield Kaylynn & Haley during the second half of the Mega Leg.)	1st	1st	3rd
DeAngelo & Gary	10th	2nd	5th	7th	5th	1st	4th	2nd	3rd	4th⊃ (Note: DeAngelo & Gary chose to use the U-Turn on Eswar & Aparna.)	4th†	
Eswar & Aparna	7th	4th	6th	5th	6th	5th	6th	5th	5th	5th†⊂		
Kaylynn & Haley	8th	8th	3rd⊃ (Note: Kaylynn & Haley chose to use the U-Turn on Jerry & Frank.)	8th‡	7th	7th‡	5th> (Note: Kaylynn & Haley chose to Yield Leo & Alana.)	6th<	6th†<			
Leo & Alana	6th	7th	8th⊂	3rd	3rd	6th	7th†<					
Michelle & Victoria	2nd	5th	7th	2nd	8th†							
Jerry & Frank	5th	9th	9th†⊂									
Kellie & LaVonne	9th	10th†										
Nathan & Cody	11th†											

== Race summary ==
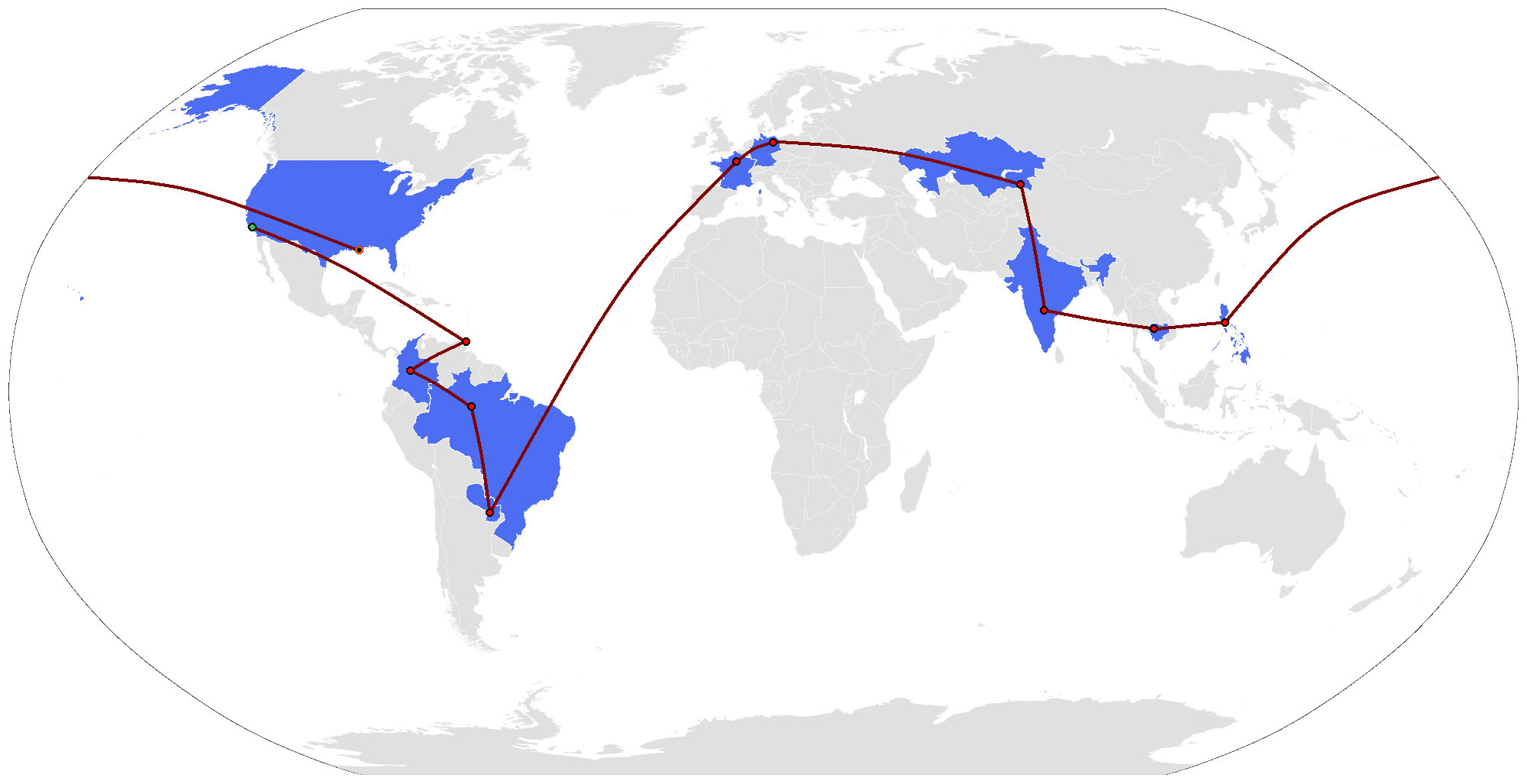
The route of The Amazing Race 32.

Destinations	Air travel Rail travel Water travel Bus travel Helicopter travel Bicycle travel Gondola travel
Route Markers	Detour Roadblock Yield U-Turn Speed Bump Pit Stop

=== Leg 1 (United States → Trinidad and Tobago) ===
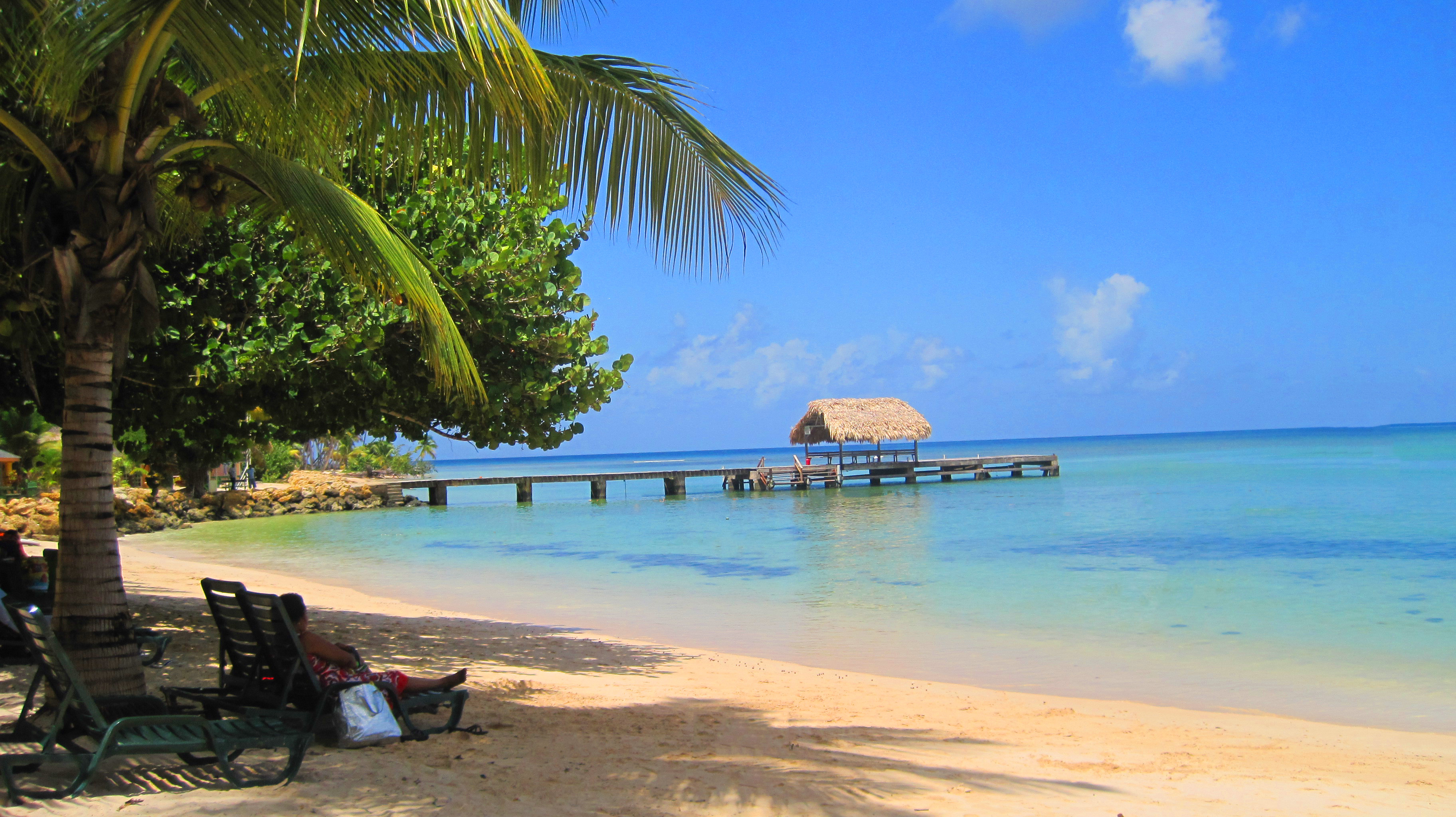
At Pigeon Point on the island of Tobago, one team member had to learn how to play the steelpan.

- Episode 1: "One Million Miles" (October 14, 2020)
- Eliminated: Nathan & Cody

Locations

- Los Angeles, California (Hollywood Bowl) (Starting Line)
- Los Angeles → Port of Spain, Trinidad and Tobago
- Saint Augustine (24 Hour Fruit Stand)
- Saint Augustine (Exodus Panyard)
- Port of Spain → Crown Point
- Pigeon Point (Swallow's Beach → Nylon Pool)
- Pigeon Point (Nylon Pool → Pigeon Point Jetty)
- Pigeon Point (Pigeon Point Beach)
- Buccoo (Buccoo Integrated Facility)

Episode summary

- Teams set off from the Hollywood Bowl and flew to the island of Trinidad. Once there, teams had to find their next clue at the 24 Hour Fruit Stand in Saint Augustine. Both team members then had to roll an oil drum used to make steelpans one-quarter mile (400 m) to a Carnival at the Exodus Panyard. There, teams had to find the Midnight Robber, who had their next clue and tickets for one of two flights to the island of Tobago on the next day.
- Once on Tobago, teams found their next clue at Swallow's Beach, which instructed them to board a boat to the Nylon Pool and memorize a uniquely-painted fish with a four-digit combination on their boat. Once at the pool, teams had to search amongst 125 fish for an exact match and unlock the fish in order to receive their next clue, which directed them to the Pigeon Point Jetty.
- In this season's first Roadblock, one team member had to learn to play a section of "Day-O" on a steelpan and then perform alongside the Redemption Sound Setters in order to receive their next clue.
- After the Roadblock, teams had to travel to Buccoo Integrated Facility and take part in goat racing, with both team members having to run across a finish line with a goat in order to check in at the Pit Stop.

Additional note

- Although the last team to arrive at the Pit Stop was eliminated, there was no rest period at the end of the leg and all remaining teams were instead instructed to continue racing.

=== Leg 2 (Trinidad and Tobago → Colombia) ===
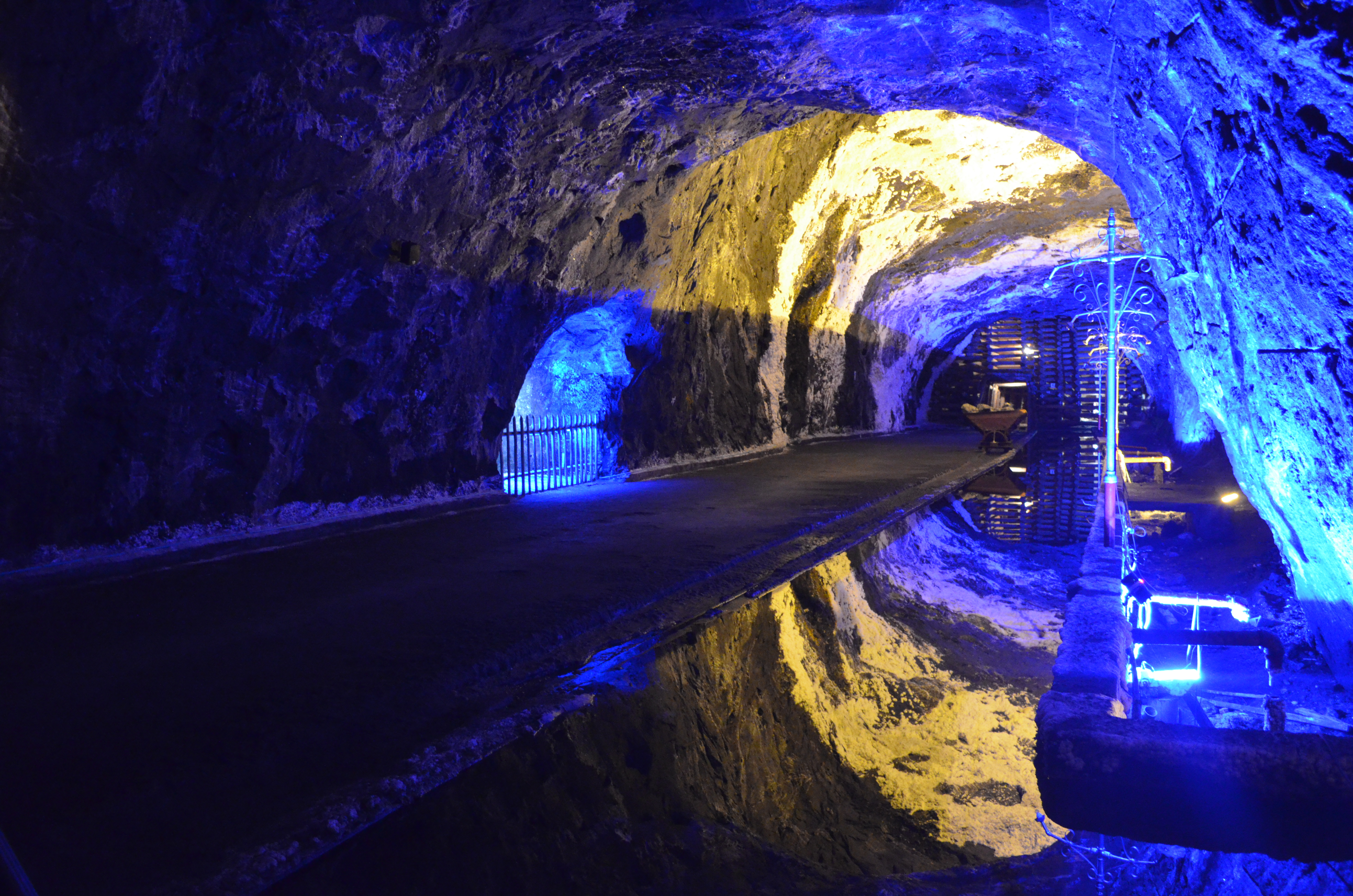
After landing in Bogotá, teams searched the Nemocón salt mine for an hourglass.

- Episode 2: "Red Lipstick is Not My Color" (October 21, 2020)
- Prize: A trip for two to Switzerland (awarded to Hung & Chee)
- Eliminated: Kellie & LaVonne

Locations

- Crown Point → Bogotá, Colombia (El Dorado International Airport)
- Nemocón (Nemocón Salt Mine)
- Nemocón (Templo Parroquial San Francisco de Asís)
- Bogotá (Plazoleta del Rosario or Universidad del Rosario)
- Bogotá (Escuela Nacional Circo Para Todos)
- Bogotá (Carrera 26 #10-03)
- Bogotá (Parque Nacional Enrique Olaya Herrera)

Episode summary

- At the start of this leg, teams were instructed to fly to Bogotá, Colombia. Once there, teams found their next clue outside the airport, which instructed them to travel by taxi to the Nemocón Salt Mine and search for either a 10- or 20-minute hourglass that they could use to Yield another team later in the season. They then signed up for one of two departure times the next morning, when they also received their next clue.
- The next day, teams had to climb to the top of the bell tower at Templo Parroquial San Francisco de Asís, retrieve either an emerald or a golden raft replica, and then travel back to Bogotá to deliver either the emerald to a broker at Plazoleta del Rosario or the raft to an archeology professor at the Universidad del Rosario in order to receive their next clue, which directed them to Escuela Nacional Circo Para Todos.
- In this leg's Roadblock, one team member had to dress as a clown, take a ride in a wheel of death, and then walk across a tightrope and back without falling or dropping any of the items they were carrying on a tray in order to receive their next clue.
- After the Roadblock, teams had to travel to Carrera 26 #10-03 and decorate a volqueta (a dump truck) so that it matched an example, as well as hook up the truck's horn, in order to receive their next clue, which directed them to the Pit Stop: Parque Nacional Enrique Olaya Herrera.

=== Leg 3 (Colombia → Brazil) ===
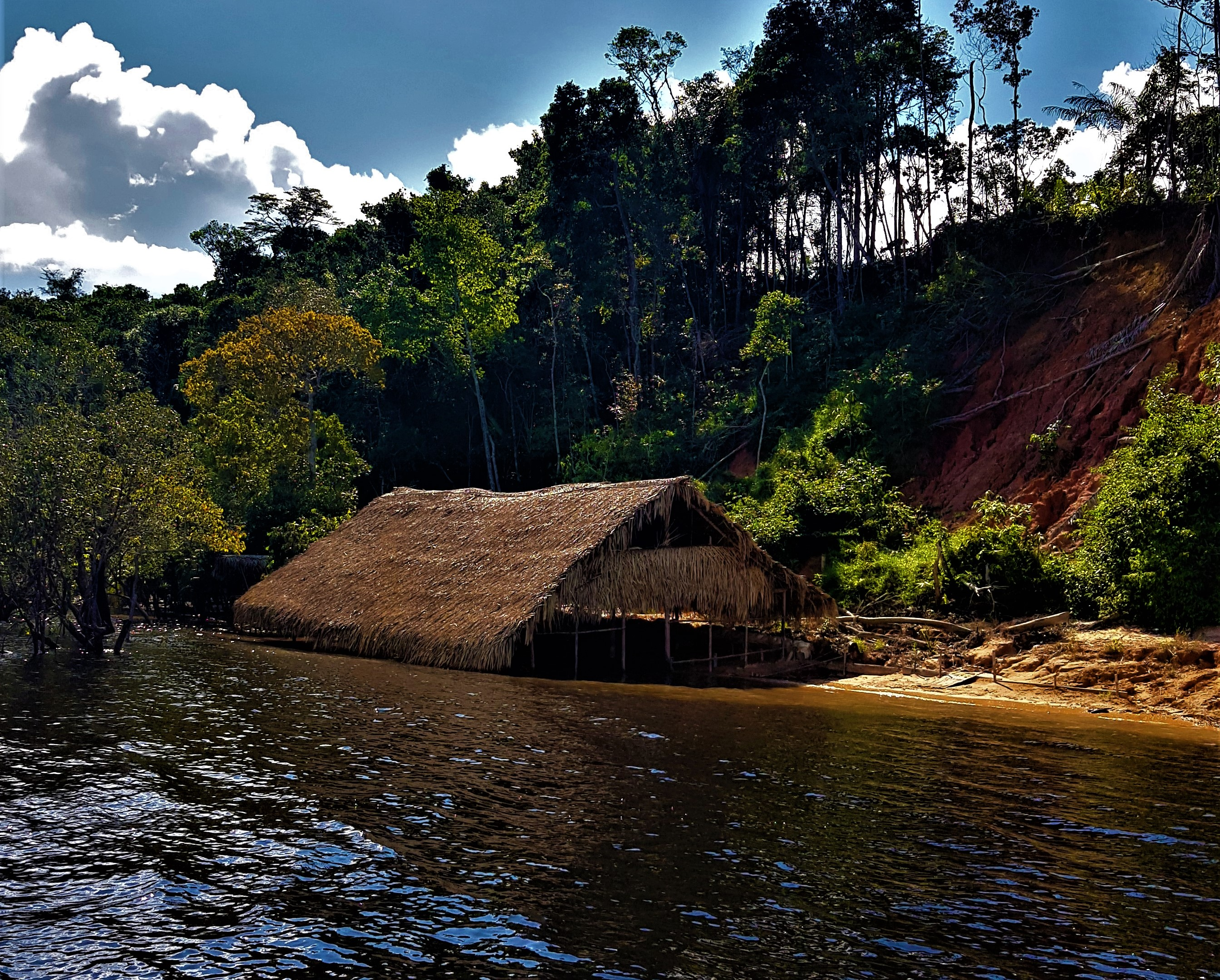
One of the Detour choices in the Amazon rainforest required teams to assemble a roof section of an indigenous Dessana house.

- Episode 3: "We're Makin' Big Moves" (October 28, 2020)
- Prize: A trip for two to Bali, Indonesia (awarded to Will & James)
- Eliminated: Jerry & Frank

Locations

- Bogotá (Parque Nacional Enrique Olaya Herrera)
- Bogotá → Manaus, Brazil
- Manaus (Mercado Municipal Adolpho Lisboa)
- Manaus (Port of Manaus – Balsa Laranja) → Tupé Reserve (Dessana Village)
- Tupé Reserve (Beach – Maloca)
- Rio Negro (Barco Corrêa Filho)

Episode summary

- At the start of this leg, teams were instructed to use a mobile app to book a flight to Manaus, Brazil. Once there, teams had to travel to the Mercado Municipal Adolpho Lisboa and purchase eleven items on a list written in Portuguese, and then bring them to the dock manager at the Balsa Laranja in order to receive their next clue. Teams then had to board a boat, which took them to Dessana Village in the Amazon rainforest, with the items that they had purchased. Once there, a chief used a blowgun to knock teams' next clue down from a tree.
- This season's first Detour was a choice between Shelter From Trees or Well Done, Please. In Shelter From Trees, teams had to carry a bundle of babassu palm leaves to the tribal chief's new house and use them to cover a section of the roof in order to receive their next clue. In Well Done, Please, teams had to use the items that they had purchased at the market to prepare a three-course meal in order to receive their next clue.
- After the Detour, teams had to travel on foot to the maloca on a nearby beach, where they found their next clue, which directed them to the Pit Stop: the Barco Corrêa Filho floating on the Rio Negro.

Additional note

- This leg featured a Double U-Turn. Will & James chose to use the U-Turn on Leo & Alana, while Kaylynn & Haley chose to use the U-Turn on Jerry & Frank.

=== Leg 4 (Brazil → Paraguay) ===
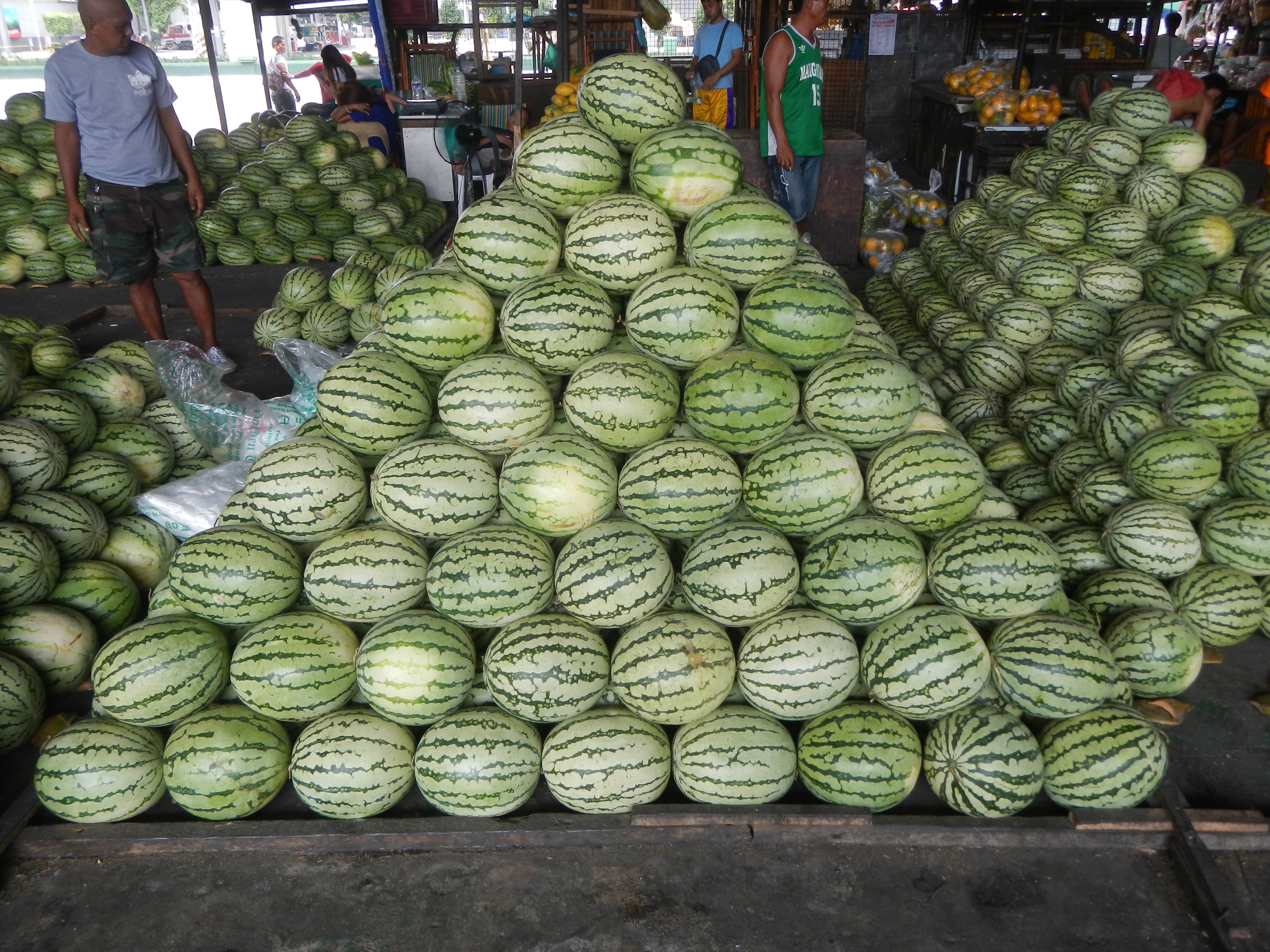
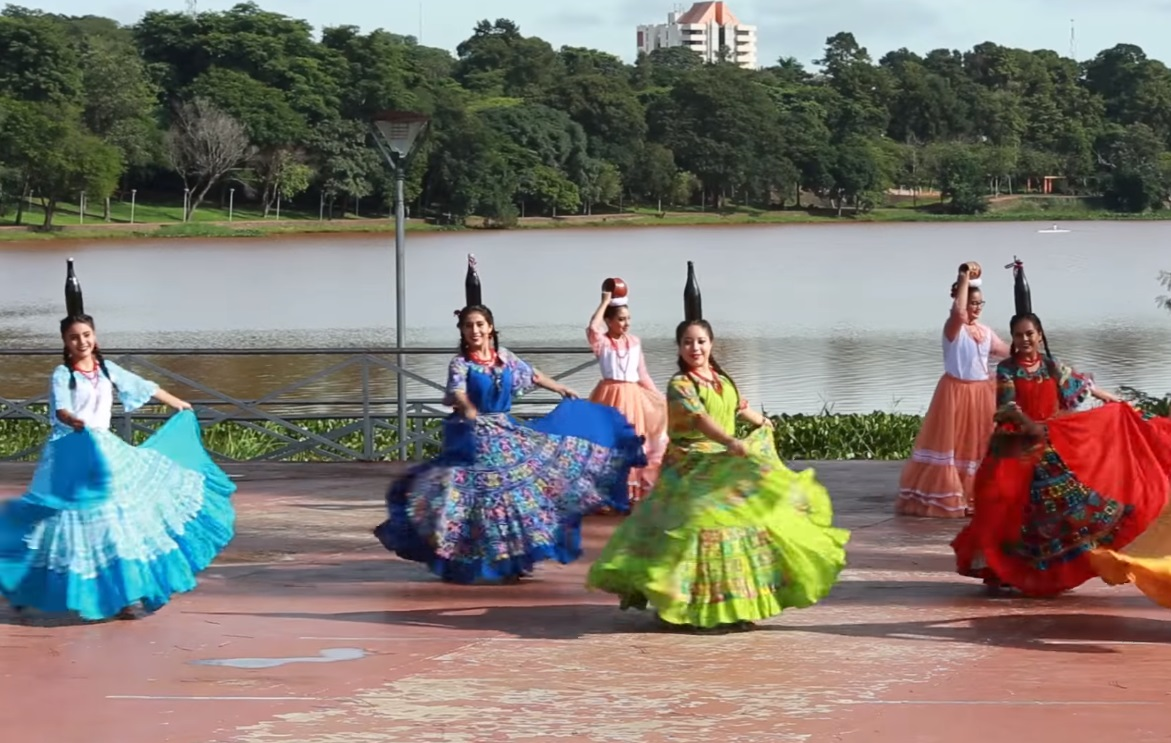
The Detour in Asunción was a Double Switchback to the watermelon stacking and bottle dance tasks from season 20.
- Episode 4: "Olé, Olé!" (November 4, 2020)
- Prize: US$5,000 each (awarded to Will & James)

Locations

- Tupé Reserve (Dessana Village) → Manaus (Hotel Tropical Manaus)
- Manaus → Asunción, Paraguay
- Asunción (Palacio de los López – Asunción Sign) (Unaired)
- Asunción (Cateura)
- Asunción (Mercado 4 – Tereré Vendor)
- Asunción (Plaza O'Leary or Estación Central del Ferrocarril)
- Asunción (Plaza Italia)

Episode summary

- During the Pit Stop, the Barco Corrêa Filho traveled back to Manaus, where teams began this leg. Teams were instructed to fly to Asunción, Paraguay, and then travel to Cateura.
- In this leg's Roadblock, one team member had to assemble a cello out of recycled items for the Recycled Orchestra of Cateura in order to receive their next clue.
- After the Roadblock, teams had to travel to Mercado 4 and use a mortar and pestle to prepare enough tereré to fill a thermos in order to receive their next clue.
- This leg's Detour was a Double Switchback, with both tasks originally from season 20, and was a choice between Stack Your Melons or Use Your Melon. In Stack Your Melons, teams had to travel to Plaza O'Leary and stack watermelons into a pyramid in order to receive their next clue. In Use Your Melon, teams had to travel to the Estación Central del Ferrocarril and perform a traditional Paraguayan bottle dance. Both team members had to successfully perform a choreographic routine with a glass bottle on their heads without breaking their bottles in order to receive their next clue.
- After the Detour, teams had to check in at the Pit Stop: Plaza Italia.

Additional notes

- After arriving in Asunción, teams had to first find the Asunción sign near Palacio de los López, where they found the clue that directed them to the Roadblock in Cateura. This task was unaired.
- This was a non-elimination leg.

=== Leg 5 (Paraguay → France) ===
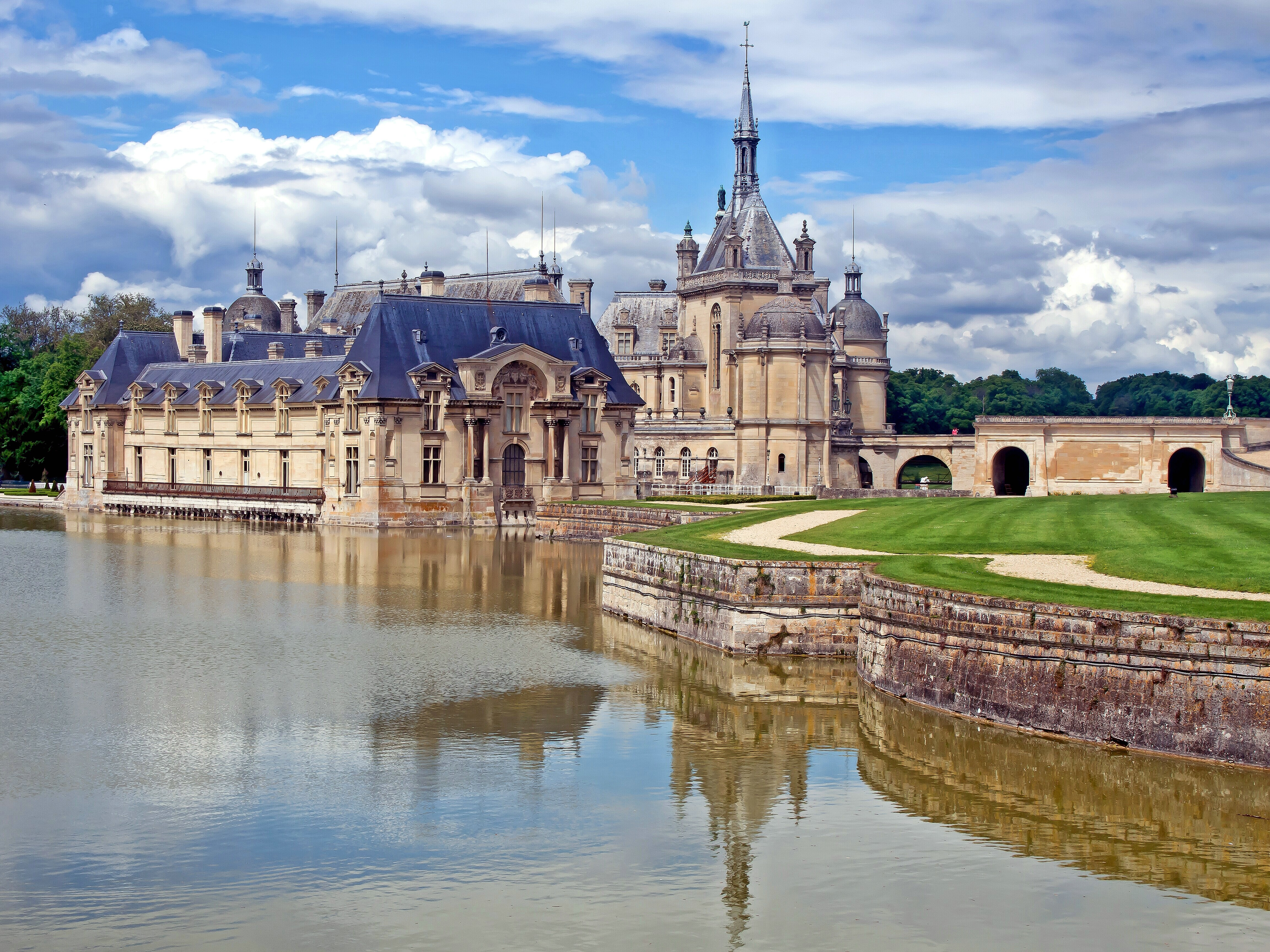
The first Roadblock in France had racers match a guest with one of the pieces of art inside the Château de Chantilly.

- Episode 5: "You Don't Strike Me as a Renaissance Man" (November 11, 2020)
- Prize: A trip for two to Phú Quốc, Vietnam (awarded to Riley & Maddison)
- Eliminated: Michelle & Victoria

Locations

- Asunción (Plaza de las Residentas)
- Asunción → Paris, France
- Chantilly (Château de Chantilly)
- Chantilly (Musée Condé)
- Chantilly (Le Vertugadin)
- Paris (Musée des Arts Forains)
- Paris (Pont des Arts)

Episode summary

- At the start of this leg, teams were instructed to fly to Paris, France. Once there, teams had to drive to the Château de Chantilly, where they found their next clue.
- For their Speed Bump, Kaylynn & Haley had to clean the riding gear for two of the château's horses before they could continue racing.
- In this leg's first Roadblock, one team member had to compare the dozens of paintings in the Musée Condé with the dozens of Renaissance-styled party guests in another room of the château in order to identify one of the nine guests dressed as a character from one of the paintings. Once a match was identified, they had to bring the guest to the museum curator and tell her the name of the artist whose painting the guest matched in order to receive their next clue.
- After the first Roadblock, teams had to travel on foot to Le Vertugadin. There, both team members had to prepare enough crème Chantilly to fill two pies and then deliver the pies through a tent where, unbeknownst to the teams, chefs pelted them with pies before receiving their next clue, which directed them to the Musée des Arts Forains in Paris.
- In this leg's second Roadblock, the team member who did not perform the previous Roadblock had to win three 19th-century carnival games at the Musée des Arts Forains before retrieving their next clue from the shooting gallery, which directed teams to the Pit Stop: the Pont des Arts.

=== Leg 6 (France → Germany) ===
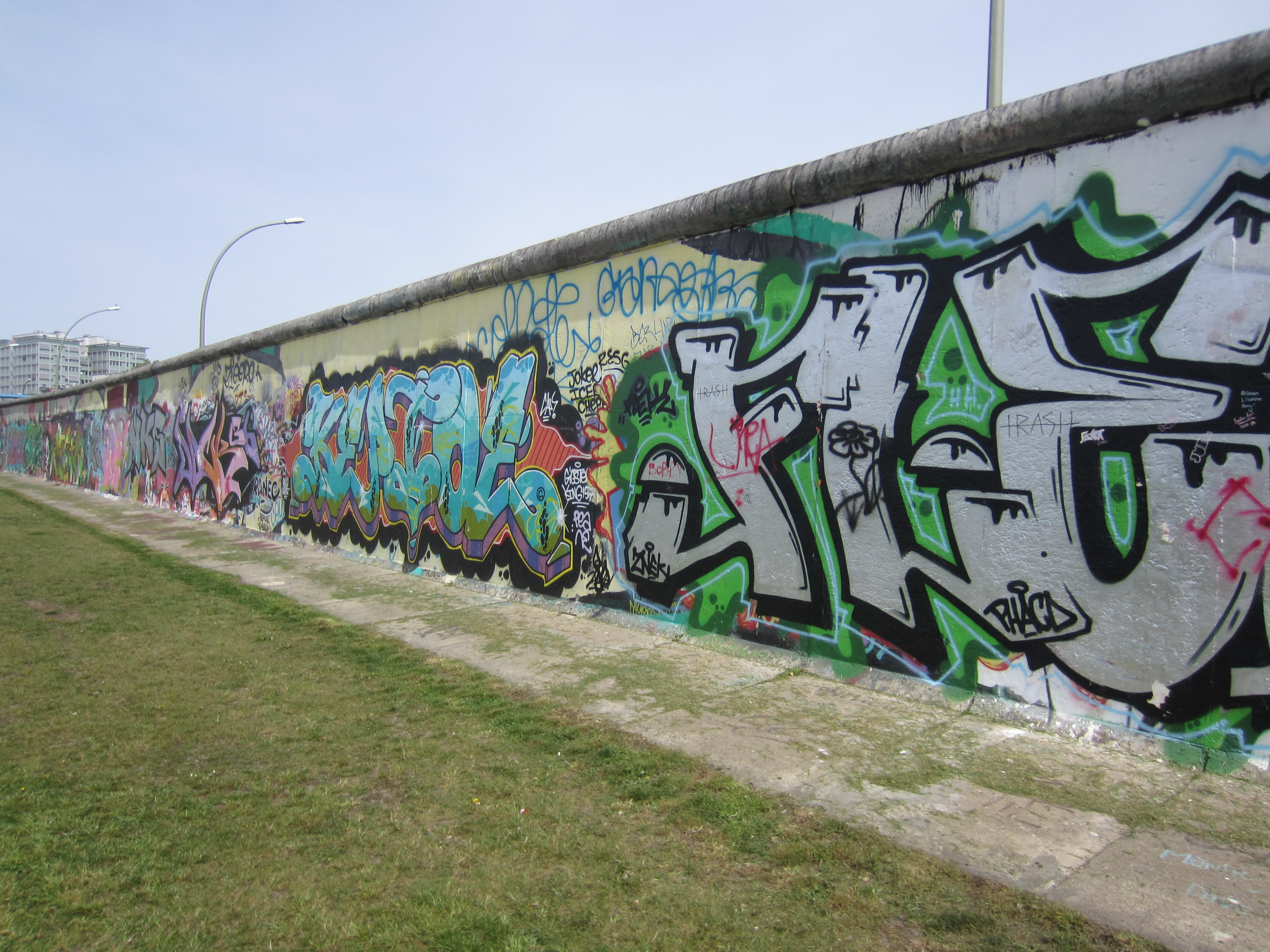
Once in Germany, teams searched for a clue along a section of the Berlin Wall.

- Episode 6: "I'm Not Even Walking, I'm Falling" (November 18, 2020)
- Prize: US$7,500 each (awarded to DeAngelo & Gary)

Locations

- Paris (Place Vendôme)
- Paris → Berlin, Germany
- Berlin (East Side Gallery)
- Berlin (Teledisko)
- Berlin (Andel's Hotel)
- Berlin (Ballhaus Berlin or Bieryoga)
- Berlin (Neukölln)

Episode summary

- At the start of this leg, teams were instructed to travel by train to Berlin, Germany. Once there, teams had to find their next clue in a suitcase marked with an Amazing Race ribbon at the East Side Gallery. Teams then had to drive an East German Trabant from the gallery to the Teledisko and dance for three minutes until the music stopped in order to receive a photograph with their next clue directing them to Andel's Hotel.
- In this leg's Roadblock, one team member had to rappel face-first nearly 180 feet (55 m) down the Andel's Hotel and memorize flashing letters which they had to unscramble once on the ground to spell a word – Sauerkraut – in order to receive their next clue.
- This leg's Detour was a choice between Belt It Out or Belch It Out. In Belt It Out, teams had to dress as chickens and correctly sing the German lyrics to "Ich wollt' ich wär' ein Huhn" ("I Wish I Were a Chicken") with the Berlin Comedian Harmonists in order to receive their next clue. In Belch It Out, teams had to lead a beer yoga class, which involved naming and completing four couples' yoga poses while drinking beer, in order to receive their next clue.
- After the Detour, teams had to check in at the Pit Stop: Neukölln.

Additional note

- This was a non-elimination leg.

=== Leg 7 (Germany → Kazakhstan) ===
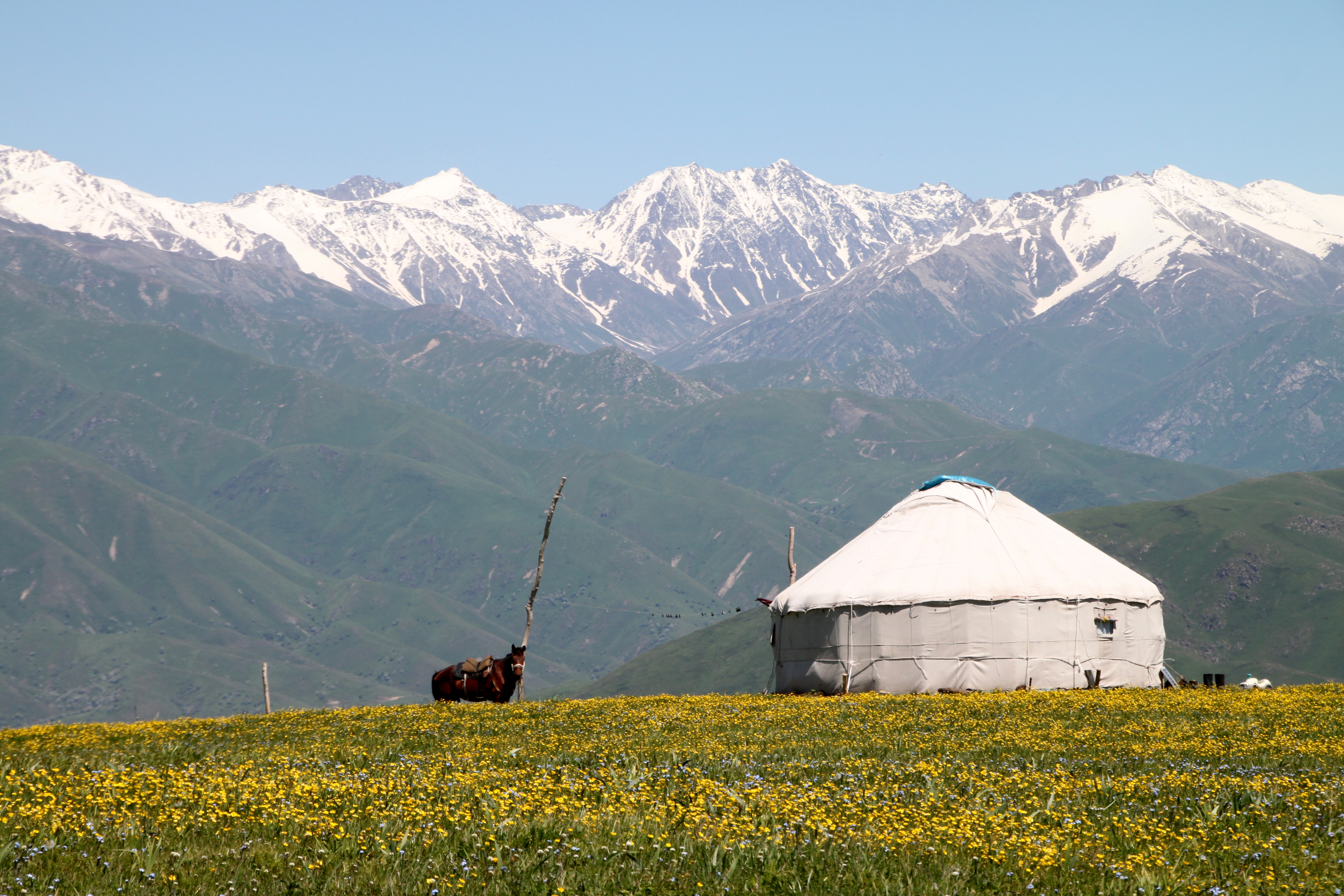
While in Kazakhstan, teams had to furnish the interior of a yurt.

- Episode 7: "Give Me a Beard Bump" (November 18, 2020)
- Prize: A trip for two to Las Vegas, Nevada (awarded to Will & James)
- Eliminated: Leo & Alana

Locations

- Berlin (InterContinental Berlin)
- Berlin → Almaty, Kazakhstan
- Almaty (Kazakhfilm Studio)
- Karasay District (Nomad Village)
- Almaty (Zelenyi Bazaar)
- Almaty (First President's Park)

Episode summary

- At the start of this leg, teams were instructed to fly to Almaty, Kazakhstan. Once there, teams had to travel to the Kazakhfilm Studio in order to find their next clue.
- For their Speed Bump, Kaylynn & Haley had to apply prosthetic beards to each other before they could continue racing.
- This leg's Detour was a choice between Great Khan's Spy or Knock Out Guy. In Great Khan's Spy, teams had to watch an elaborate action sequence and correctly answer a series of questions from the actor portraying Genghis Khan in order to receive their next clue. If they answered any of the questions incorrectly, they had to watch the action sequence again before making another attempt. In Knock Out Guy, teams had to perform a choreographed fight scene before breaking a vase in order to retrieve their next clue.
- After the Detour, teams traveled to a nomad village in Karasay District and found their next clue, which instructed them to lead a camel laden with possessions to an empty yurt. There, teams had to set up the interior so that it matched an example, which included procuring a boiled sheep's head from the nomads, in order to receive their next clue. Teams were then directed to the Zelenyi Bazaar in Almaty and had to search the meat market for their next clue, which directed them to the Pit Stop: First President's Park.

Additional note

- Kaylynn & Haley chose to use the Yield on Leo & Alana.

=== Leg 8 (Kazakhstan → India) ===
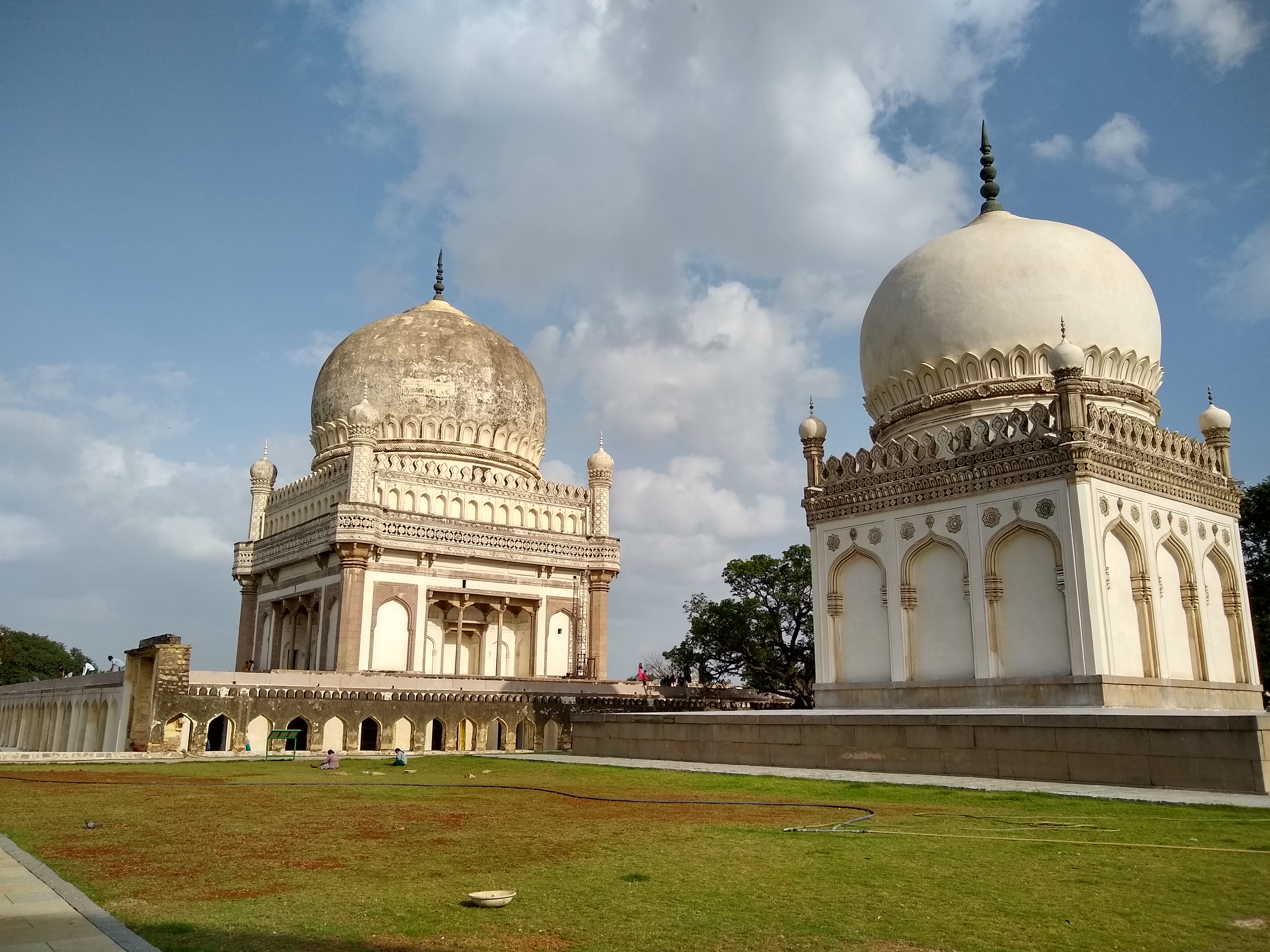
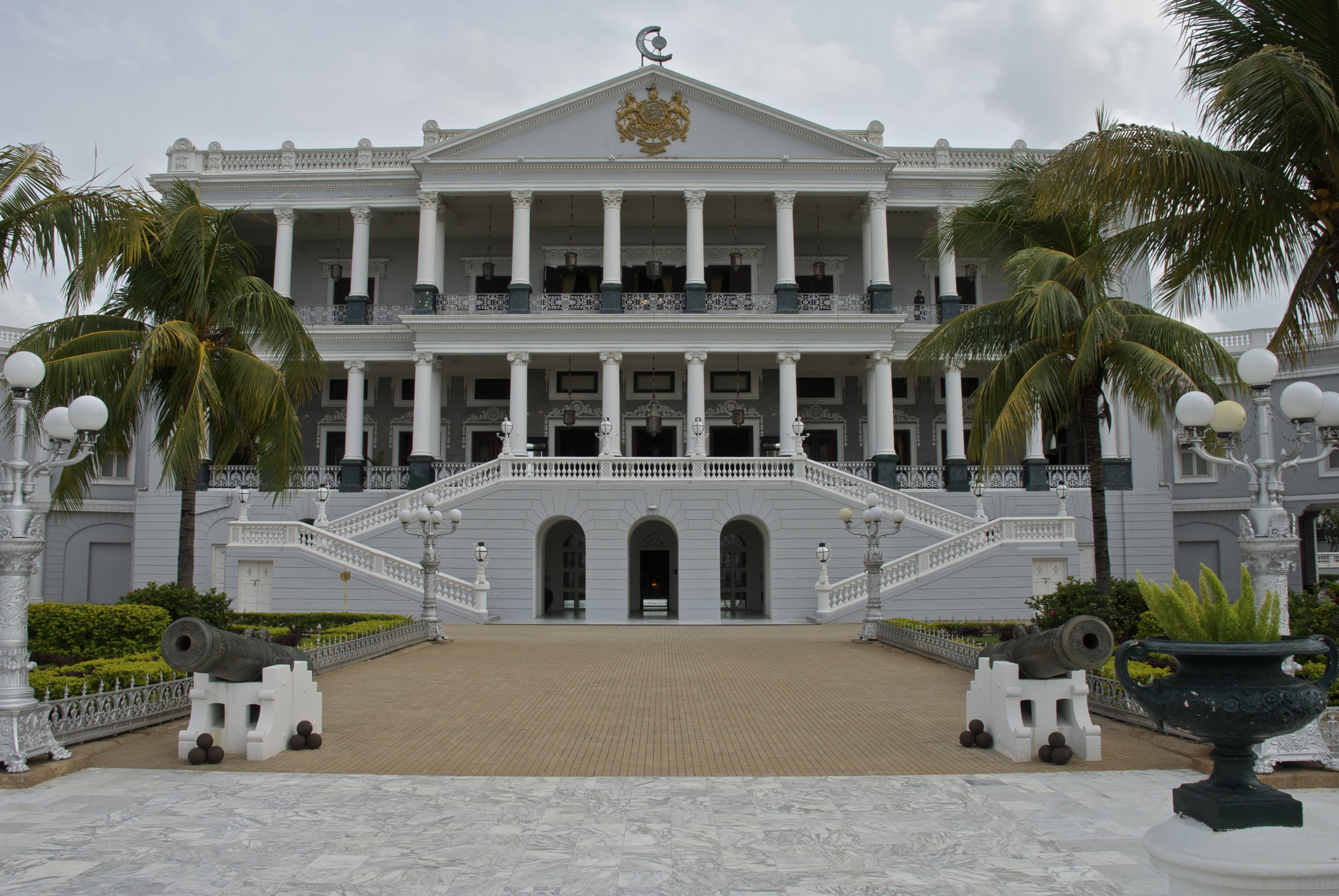
During the Mega Leg in Hyderabad, teams found their first Roadblock at Qutb Shahi tombs and completed the final task at Taj Falaknuma Palace.
- Episode 8: "Are You a Rickshaw?" & Episode 9: "This is Not Payback, This is Karma" (November 25, 2020)
- Prize: A seven-day Eastern Caribbean cruise for two (awarded to Riley & Maddison)
- Eliminated: Kaylynn & Haley

Locations

- Almaty (Hotel Royal Tulip)
- Almaty → Hyderabad, India
- Hyderabad (Multi Cuisine Restaurant)
- Hyderabad (The Platina or T-Hub)
- Hyderabad (Qutb Shahi Tombs – Muhammad Quli Qutb Shah Mausoleum)
- Hyderabad (Charminar)
- Hyderabad (Laad Bazaar or Iqbal Dentist)
- Hyderabad (Taj Falaknuma Palace)

Episode summary (Episode 8)

- At the start of this leg, teams were instructed to fly to Hyderabad, India. Once there, teams had to smog test three auto rickshaws in order to receive their next clue.
- This leg's first Detour was a choice between Food App or Number Trap. In Food App, teams had to pick up three Swiggy food orders from a restaurant and deliver them to the correct addresses as instructed to them by a phone operator in order to receive their next clue. In Number Trap, teams had to capture all of the highlighted ones and zeros on a motion detecting screen and then use the numbers to crack a binary code that led them to their next clue.
- After the first Detour, teams found their next clue at the Qutb Shahi Tombs.
- In this leg's first Roadblock, one team member had to use an augmented reality feature on a tablet computer to find three virtual men wearing turbans and standing in front of the tomb's columns. They then had to find the matching men atop the tomb and place them above the correct columns in order to receive three scrolls that they could exchange for their next clue.

Episode summary (Episode 9)

- After the first Roadblock, teams found their next clue at the Charminar.
- This leg's second Detour was a Blind Detour, where teams only learned about the task that they chose once they arrived at its location, and was a choice between This or That. In This, teams had to push a cart of bangles to a store and then find a set of seven bangles that matched the ones worn by a bride in order to receive their next clue. In That, teams had to make a dental impression of a patient's teeth and then polish a set of dentures before fitting them into another patient's mouth in order to receive their next clue.
- After the second Detour, teams had to travel to the Taj Falaknuma Palace, where they had to don sherwani outfits and then travel by horse and carriage with a pair of socialites to their next clue.
- In this leg's second Roadblock, one team member had to prepare ten place settings on a section of India's longest table to the exact standards for a royal dinner in order to receive their next clue, which directed them to the nearby Pit Stop.

Additional notes

- Leg 8 was a Mega Leg spread out over two episodes, both of which aired back-to-back on the same night.
- Will & James chose to use the Yield on Kaylynn & Haley during the first half of this leg.
- Riley & Maddison chose to also use the Yield on Kaylynn & Haley during the second half of this leg.

=== Leg 9 (India → Cambodia) ===
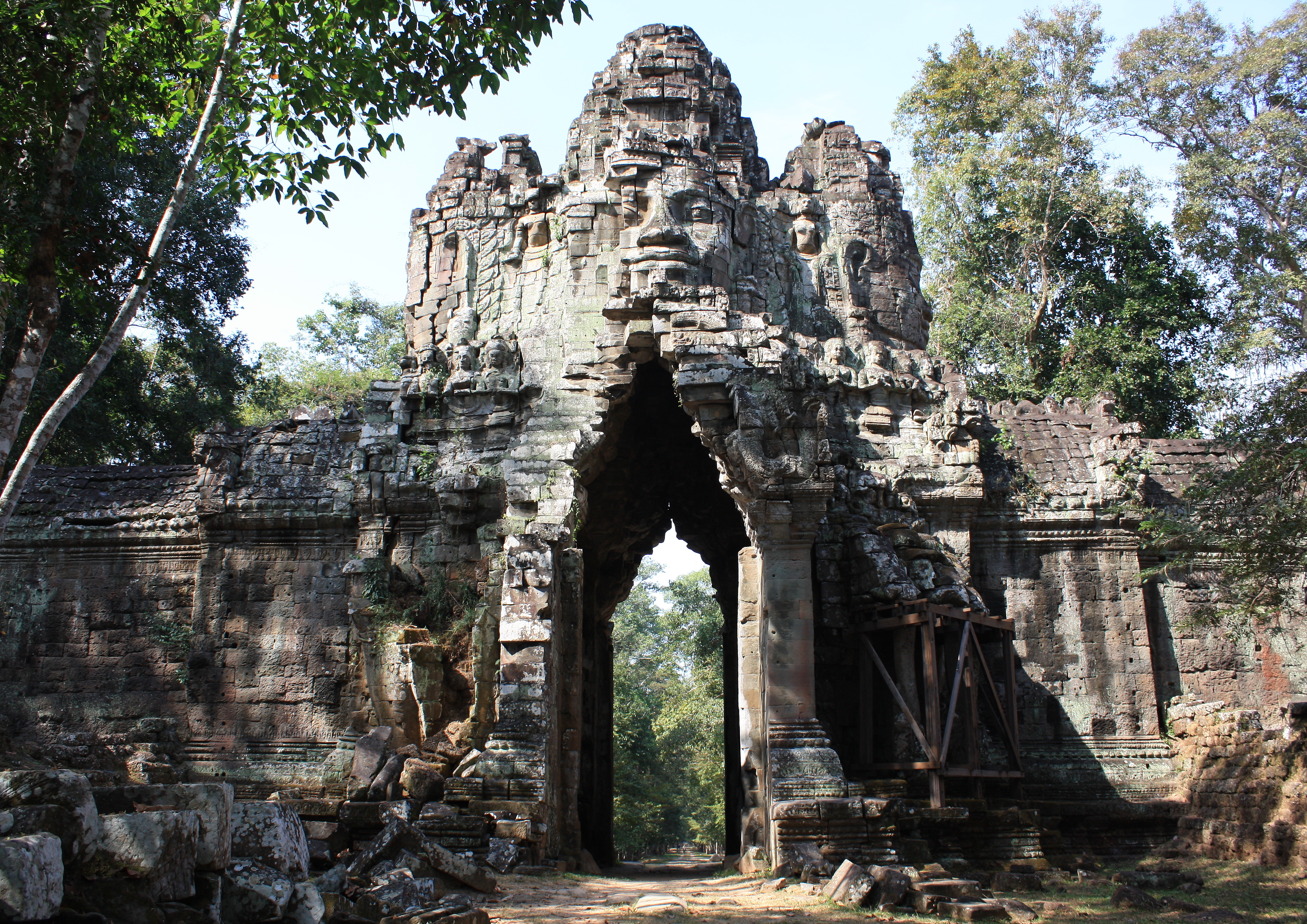
Teams found the Pit Stop in Cambodia near the eastern gate of Angkor Thom.

- Episode 10: "Getting Down to the Nitty Gritty" (December 2, 2020)
- Prize: A trip for two to Bergen, Norway (awarded to Riley & Maddison)
- Eliminated: Eswar & Aparna

Locations

- Hyderabad (Taj Falaknuma Palace)
- Hyderabad → Siem Reap, Cambodia
- Siem Reap (Old Market)
- Siem Reap (Chong Kneas Pier) → Tonlé Sap (Silat Tik Meas Buddhist Temple)
- Tonlé Sap (Chong Kneas Village)
- Tonlé Sap (Floating Restaurant)
- Siem Reap (Khmer Floor Handicraft)
- Siem Reap (Angkor Thom – East Gate)

Episode summary

- At the start of this leg, teams were instructed to fly to Siem Reap, Cambodia. Once there, teams had to find a marked tuk-tuk at the Old Market with a Travelocity Roaming Gnome, a basket of donations, and their next clue, which instructed them to attach their tuk-tuk to a motorbike and travel to Chong Kneas Pier. There, they had to search for their next clue, which instructed teams to travel by long-tail boat to Silat Tik Meas Buddhist Temple and respectfully give their basket of donations to a monk in order to receive their next clue.
- This season's final Detour was a choice between Fish or Farm. In Fish, teams had to pull a 3,280-foot (1,000 m) fishing net and collect at least 15 kilograms (33 lb) of fish in order to receive their next clue. In Farm, teams had to mix a combination of compost and soil, plant a garden of local produce on a floating platform so as to match an example floating garden, and then plant seeds from their gnome's satchel in order to receive their next clue.
- After the Detour, teams had to travel by long-tail boat to a floating restaurant in order to find their next clue, which instructed teams to return to Siem Reap and travel to Khmer Floor Handicraft in order to find their next clue.
- In this leg's Roadblock, one team member had to make an encaustic cement tile. They then had to use a key from the gnome's satchel to unlock a chest of sliding puzzle pieces that they had to solve in order to receive their next clue, which directed them to the Pit Stop: the east gate of Angkor Thom.

Additional note

- This leg featured a Double U-Turn. DeAngelo and Gary chose to use the U-Turn on Eswar & Aparna, while Riley & Maddison attempted to use the U-Turn on DeAngelo & Gary. However, DeAngelo & Gary had already passed the U-Turn by this point and were therefore unaffected.

=== Leg 10 (Cambodia → Philippines) ===
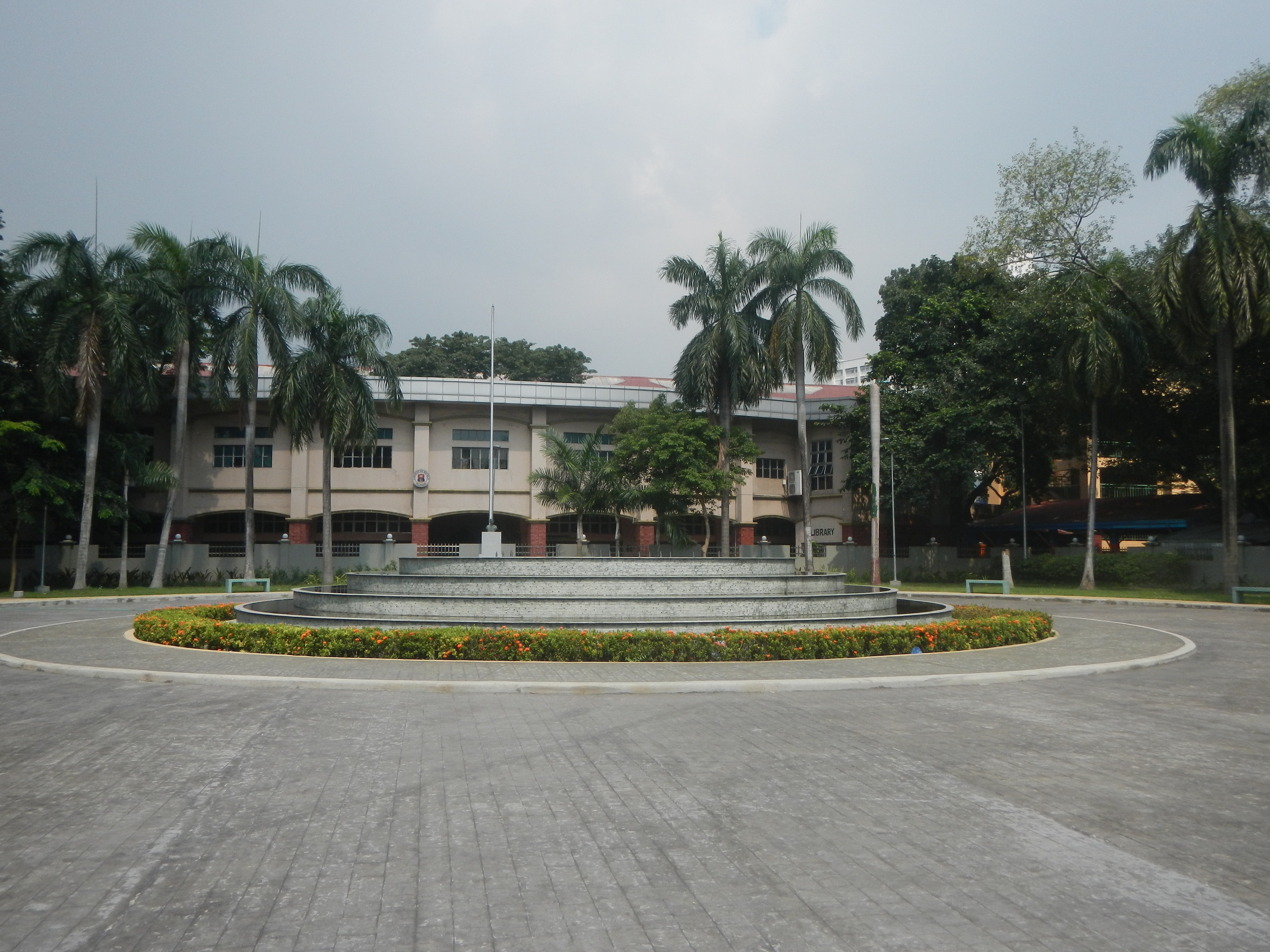
The final task in the City Sprint across Manila was set at Mehan Garden.

- Episode 11: "Run on Your Tippy Toes" (December 9, 2020)
- Eliminated: DeAngelo & Gary

Locations

- Siem Reap (Angkor Century Resort and Spa)
- Siem Reap → Manila, Philippines
- Manila (Rizal Park – Lapu-Lapu Circle)
- Pasay (Intersection of Macapagal Boulevard & Epifanio de los Santos Avenue)
- Pasay (Mall of Asia)
- Manila (Binondo – Arch of Goodwill)
- Manila (Manila Central Post Office)
- Manila (Liwasang Bonifacio)
- Manila (Mehan Garden)
- Manila (Rizal Park – Lapu-Lapu Circle)

Episode summary

- At the start of this leg, teams were instructed to fly to Manila, Philippines. Once there, teams boarded a jeepney that transported them to Lapu-Lapu Circle, where they were greeted by Phil Keoghan. He informed them that this leg would be a City Sprint, meaning teams would have to complete a series of challenges before returning to Lapu-Lapu Circle, which would serve as the leg's Pit Stop, and there would be no Detours or Roadblocks. Phil then informed teams to find their next clue in a marked jeepney near Rizal Park.
- Teams had to solve a riddle that led them to dancing traffic enforcer Ramiro Hinojas at the intersection of Macapagal Boulevard and Epifanio de los Santos Avenue, and had to grab their next clue from Hinojas as they drove past him. Teams were then sent to the Mall of Asia, where they were instructed to run one lap around the esplanade while wearing high-heeled shoes in order to receive their next clue.
- After passing through the Arch of Goodwill, teams had to search Binondo for the one lion dancer out of four who had their next clue in its mouth. Teams continued on foot to the Manila Central Post Office, where they were instructed to prepare feed for a horse attached to a kalesa in Liwasang Bonifacio by obtaining ingredients from three nearby vendors in order to receive their next clue.
- After traveling on foot to Mehan Garden, teams had to listen to a band playing four songs that they had heard in previous legs. They then had to find the four instrument cases marked with the flags of the respective countries where they'd heard the songs, and then present them to the band in the order that they visited the countries, and not the order that the band was playing the music, in order to receive their next clue.

Leg	Flag	Music
1	Trinidad and Tobago	"Day-O"
2	Colombia	"Entrance of the Gladiators"
4	Paraguay	"Pájaro Campana"
5	France	French Renaissance music

Additional note

- Filipino basketball player E.J. Feihl appeared as the Pit Stop greeter during this leg.

=== Leg 11 (Philippines → United States) ===
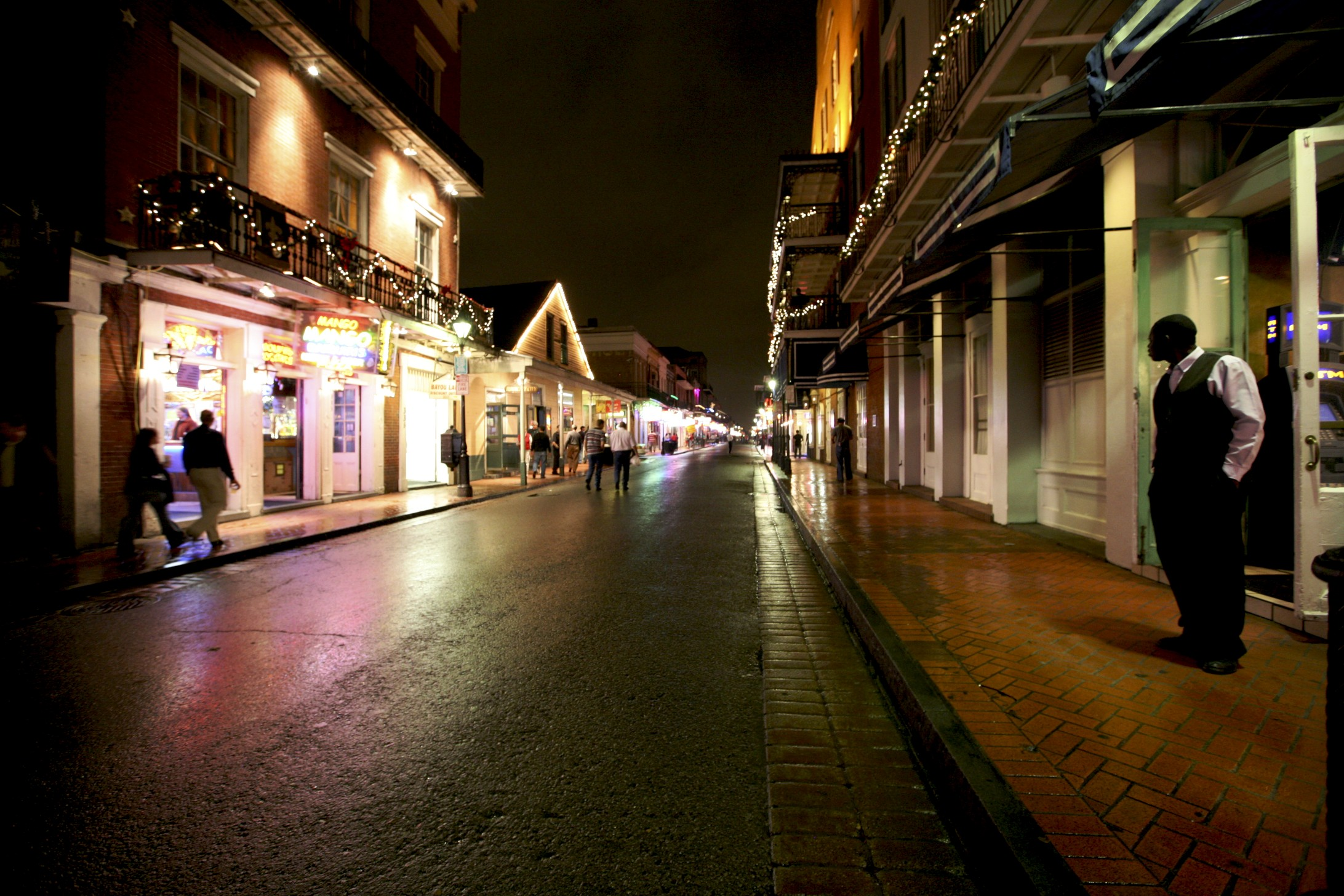
In their final destination city, teams visited the historic Bourbon Street of New Orleans.

- Episode 12: "Now It's About Winning" (December 16, 2020)
- Prize: US$1,000,000
- Winners: Will & James
- Runners-up: Hung & Chee
- Third place: Riley & Maddison

Locations

- Manila (Rizal Park – Lapu-Lapu Circle)
- Manila → New Orleans, Louisiana
- New Orleans (Louis Armstrong Park)
- New Orleans (French Quarter – Bourbon Street)
- New Orleans (French Quarter – Cafe Beignet)
- New Orleans (New Orleans Morial Convention Center)
- New Orleans (Crescent City Connection)
- New Orleans (Mardi Gras World)
- New Orleans (Mercedes-Benz Superdome)

Episode summary

- At the start of this leg, teams were instructed to fly to New Orleans, Louisiana. Once there, teams had to travel to Louis Armstrong Park and find their next clue, which directed them to Bourbon Street. There, teams had to climb atop a Mardi Gras parade float and collect beads thrown at them from nearby balconies until one team member had 50 red beads and the other had 50 gold beads, when they received their next clue.
- In this leg's first Roadblock, teams had to join a Dixieland band and play vest frottoirs until they reached Cafe Beignet, where one team member had to search through king cakes until they found a small king cake baby inside one of the cakes. Both team members then had to eat six beignets between the two of them before receiving their next clue.
- After the first Roadblock, teams had to travel to the New Orleans Morial Convention Center, which had their next clue.
- In this season's final Roadblock, the team member who did not perform the previous Roadblock had to climb beneath the Crescent City Connection, jump from a seated position from a beam 180 feet (55 m) above the Mississippi River, and grab their next clue.
- After the second Roadblock, teams had to rappel back to the ground, roll a 10-foot (3.0 m) tall ball to Mardi Gras World, and find their next clue. Then, teams had to search the warehouse for a crate with 32 panels that they had to attach to their ball so as to create a giant globe and place it upright on a float before receiving their final clue, which instructed teams to find the finish line where "the Saints go marching in", referring to the NFL team's home stadium: the Mercedes-Benz Superdome.

== Reception ==
=== Critical response ===
The Amazing Race 32 received mixed reviews. Andy Dehnart of reality blurred wrote that the season was "imperfect but thoroughly enjoyable" and that the biggest letdown of the season was the Mine Five alliance. Justin Fedich of Screen Rant called the season a "standout" and praised the diversity in casting and the gameplay and engagement of winners Will & James. Mack Rawden of CinemaBlend criticized seeing "an entire season controlled and ultimately ruined by an alliance". Matt Roush of TV Insider criticized the answer-sharing among the "Mine Five" alliance saying that it felt like "cheating on a test" and that it "soured" the season. In response to criticism from critics and fans about answer-sharing among alliance members, Amazing Race co-creator and executive producer Elise Doganieri stated in an interview after the season that the show was considering challenge-specific rules to limit answer-sharing. In 2024, Rhenn Taguiam of Game Rant placed this season within the bottom 13 out of 36.

=== Ratings ===
U.S. Nielsen ratings

Viewership and ratings per episode of The Amazing Race 32
No.	Title	Air date	Rating (18–49)	Viewers (millions)	DVR (18–49)	DVR viewers (millions)	Total (18–49)	Total viewers (millions)	Ref.
1	"One Million Miles"	October 14, 2020	0.7	3.58	—N/a	—N/a	—N/a	—N/a	
2	"Red Lipstick is Not My Color"	October 21, 2020	0.7	3.30	0.4	1.63	1.1	4.93	
3	"We're Makin' Big Moves"	October 28, 2020	0.7	4.17	0.4	1.36	1.1	5.53	
4	"Olé, Olé!"	November 4, 2020	0.7	4.03	0.4	1.40	1.1	5.43	
5	"You Don't Strike Me as a Renaissance Man"	November 11, 2020	0.7	3.72	0.3	1.10	1.0	4.83	
6	"I'm Not Even Walking, I'm Falling"	November 18, 2020	0.7	3.90	0.3	1.54	1.0	5.44	
7	"Give Me a Beard Bump"	November 18, 2020	0.6	3.18	0.4	1.67	1.0	4.86	
8	"Are You a Rickshaw?"	November 25, 2020	0.6	4.20	—N/a	—N/a	—N/a	—N/a	
9	"This is Not Payback, This is Karma"	November 25, 2020	0.6	3.80	—N/a	—N/a	—N/a	—N/a	
10	"Getting Down to the Nitty Gritty"	December 2, 2020	0.7	4.30	0.4	1.30	1.1	5.60	
11	"Run on Your Tippy Toes"	December 9, 2020	0.7	4.15	0.4	1.39	1.1	5.54	
12	"Now It's About Winning"	December 16, 2020	0.8	4.46	—N/a	—N/a	—N/a	—N/a	

Canadian ratings

Canadian broadcaster CTV also aired The Amazing Race on Wednesdays.

Canadian DVR ratings are included in Numeris's count.

No.	Air date	Episode	Viewers (millions)	Rank (Week)	Ref
1	October 14, 2020	"One Million Miles"	1.72	2	
2	October 21, 2020	"Red Lipstick is Not My Color"	1.50	1	
3	October 28, 2020	"We're Makin' Big Moves"	1.46	5	
4	November 4, 2020	"Olé, Olé!"	1.30	8	
5	November 11, 2020	"You Don't Strike Me as a Renaissance Man"	1.25	10	
6	November 18, 2020	"I'm Not Even Walking, I'm Falling"	1.37	12	
7	November 18, 2020	"Give Me a Beard Bump"	0.83	29	
8	November 25, 2020	"Are You a Rickshaw?"	1.57	6	
9	November 25, 2020	"This is Not Payback, This is Karma"	1.57	6	
10	December 2, 2020	"Getting Down to the Nitty Gritty"	1.22	12	
11	December 9, 2020	"Run on Your Tippy Toes"	1.33	12	
12	December 16, 2020	"Now It's About Winning"	1.44	9	

== Works cited ==
- Castro, Adam-Troy (2006). My Ox Is Broken!. BenBella Books. ISBN 978-1-932100-91-4.
