= First President Park =

Urban park in Almaty, Kazakhstan

First President of the Republic of Kazakhstan Park
- Қазақстан Республикасының Тұңғыш Президенті саябағы (Kazakh); Парк Первого Президента Республики Казахстан (Russian)
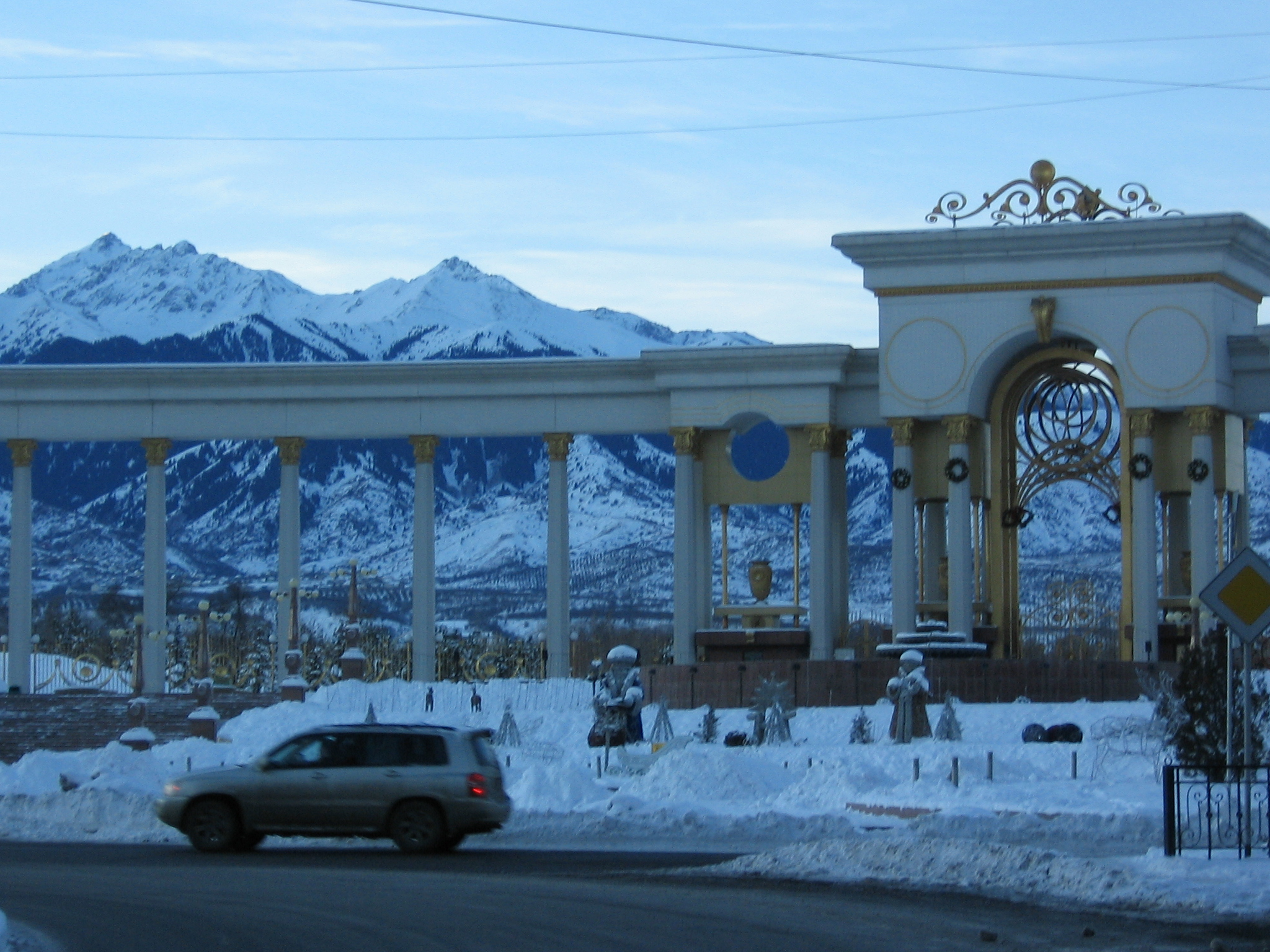
- Entrance of the park in winter
- Interactive map of First President of the Republic of Kazakhstan Park
- Type: Urban park
- Location: Almaty, Kazakhstan
- Coordinates: 43.188°N 76.887°E
- Area: 180 acres (73 ha)
- Created: 2010
- Status: Open

The First President of the Republic of Kazakhstan Park (Kazakh: Қазақстан Республикасының Тұңғыш Президенті саябағы, romanized: Qazaqstan Respublikasynyñ Tūñğyş Prezidentı saiabağy; Russian: Парк Первого Президента Республики Казахстан, romanized: Park Pervogo Prezidenta Respubliki Kazakhstan) or simply First President Park (Kazakh: Тұнғыш Президент саябағы, romanized: Tūnğyş Prezident saiabağy; Russian: Парк Первого Президента, romanized: Park Pervogo Prezidenta) is an urban park situated in the southern part of Almaty, within the Bostandyq District. It is located at the intersection of Navoi Street and Al-Farabi Avenue, two of the city's main thoroughfares. The park officially opened to the public in July 2010 and was named in honour of Nursultan Nazarbayev, the first President of Kazakhstan.

Covering a vast area, the park features expansive green spaces, tree-lined pathways, fountains, and monuments, making it a popular destination for both residents and visitors. It serves as a symbol of Kazakhstan's modern development and provides a recreational space for leisure activities, cultural events, and public gatherings. The park's design incorporates elements that reflect the country's natural beauty and cultural heritage, emphasizing its role as a major urban landmark in Almaty.

== History ==
The park's location was originally home to thriving state-owned apple orchards, which fell into disrepair following the dissolution of the Soviet Union. In the mid-1990s, large tracts of this agricultural land were privatized and sold at minimal cost for construction purposes. The area now encompassing the park was initially intended to host an elite cottage community named Crystal Air Village. However, in 2000, the contract for the sale of this land was annulled, and plans for the residential development were abandoned. Subsequently, a decision was made to establish a park on the site, provisionally named 21st Century Park.

Development of the park began in 2001. Early landscaping included the planting of greenery according to a specialized ecological plan. A significant milestone was marked in 2001 when President Nursultan Nazarbayev personally planted an oak tree in the park. Later, in 2008, in honor of Almaty's participation in the Olympic torch relay for the Beijing Summer Olympics, about 100 spruces and birches were planted.

The park remained closed to the public during its initial development and refinement stages but was officially opened to visitors in July 2010.

In 2011, another 100 Tien Shan spruces were planted in the park's premises.

== Design and features ==
The park spans over 9.5 hectares of water projects and an additional 4.8 hectares of landscaped areas. Plans for the southern section include an artificial mountain landscape, complete with a lake and cascading streams. The envisioned Klimatron, a unique climate-controlled structure, was to be located at the heart of the park.

A monumental and sculptural composition, Kazakhstan, was unveiled on 11 November 2011 to commemorate the 20th anniversary of the country's independence. The monument features a golden eagle crafted from bronze, granite, and marble. Its centerpiece is a figure of Nazarbayev surrounded by architectural and historical symbols representing Almaty, Astana, and the nation as a whole.

The park's fountain complex consists of five interconnected bowls at varying levels. The central fountain reaches a height of 30 meters and features a sculpture of a crown adorned with medallions depicting zodiac signs.

== Amenities ==
Three parking zones are available for visitors, accessible from Sadyqov Street, Al-Farabi Avenue, and Dulati Street. Subsequent renovations were carried out in 2013 and 2014 to maintain and enhance the park's infrastructure.
