= Pigeon Point, Tobago =

Beach in Trinidad and Tobago

Coordinates: 11.1167°N 60.839°W

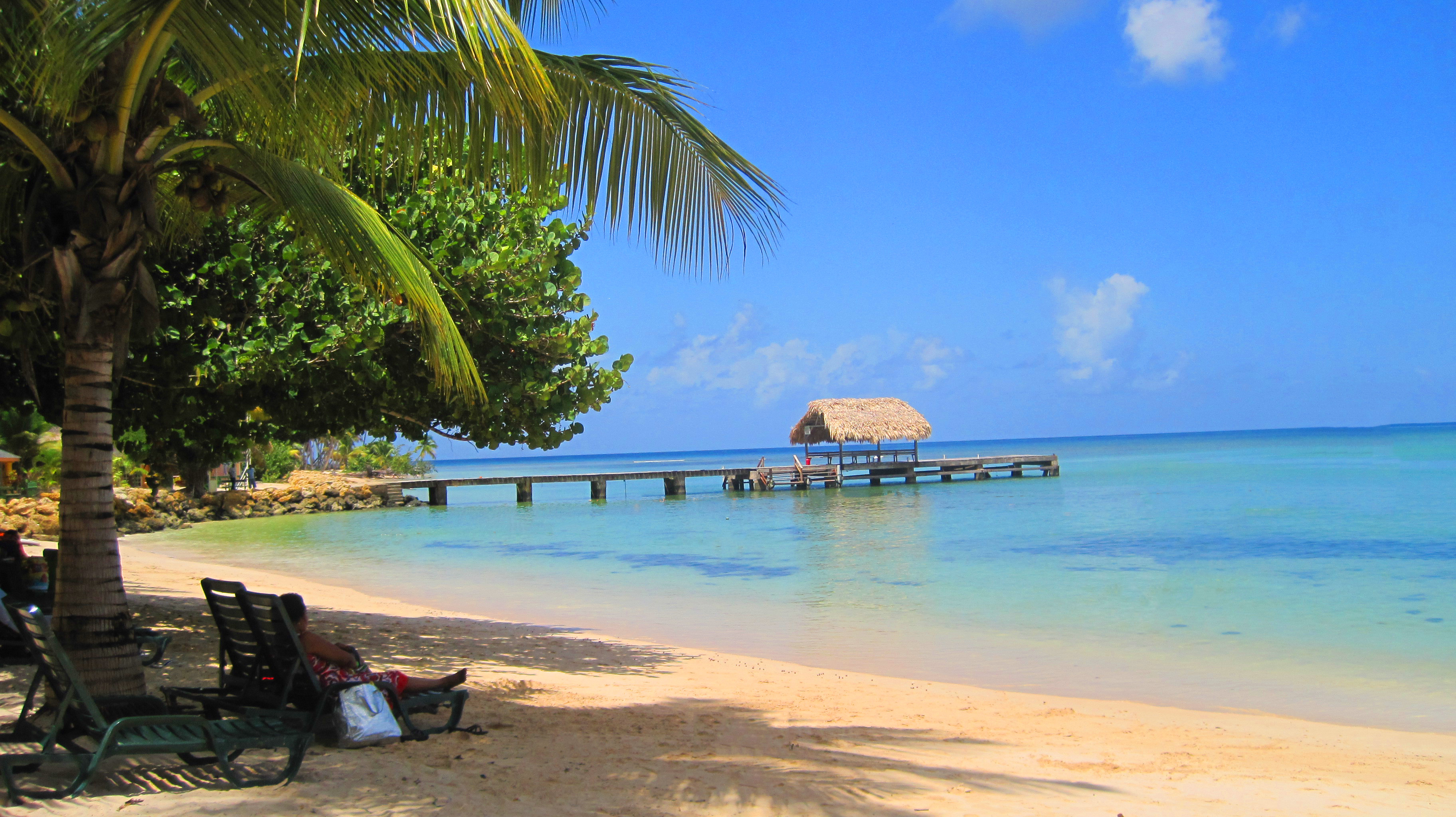
The beach at Pigeon Point, Tobago

Pigeon Point is also known as Pigeon Point Heritage Park (PPHP) and is often considered Tobago’s most beautiful beach and is home to the world famous thatch-roofed jetty which has become an internationally recognised signature of Tobago. The resort includes a long stretch of white sand beach with warm aquamarine waters. There are excellent beach facilities such as bathrooms, showers and beach-chair rentals as well as bars and a restaurant. Tourist amenities include souvenir and water-sports shops.

The peninsula has been the subject of major controversy over recent years after the property was bought by Dr. Anthony Sabga, founder and chairman of the Trinidad-based Ansa McAl conglomerate.

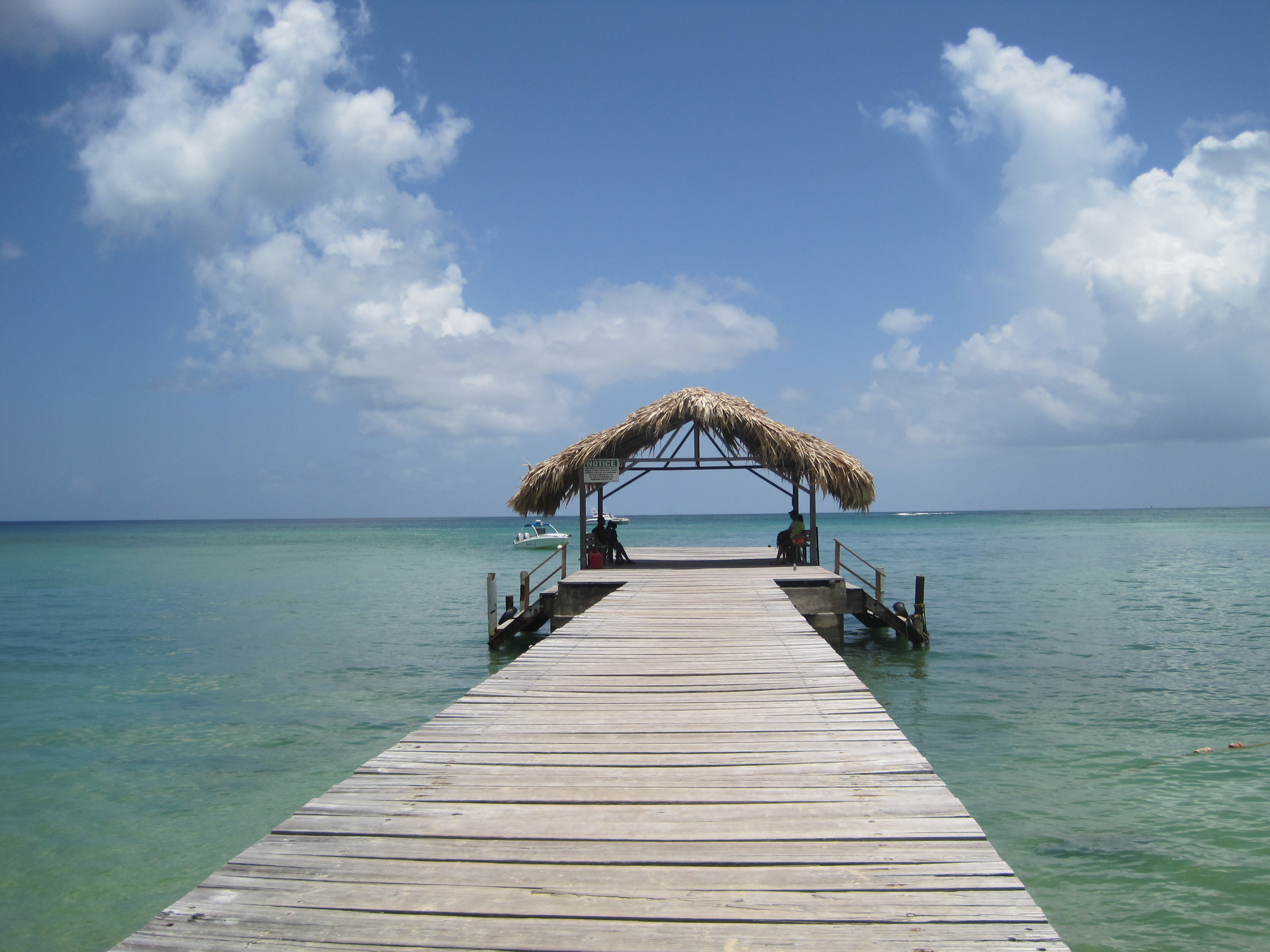
Popular jetty/pier at Pigeon Point

In early 2005 the government promised to purchase the property; by compulsory purchase order if necessary. A deal was struck and the peninsula became the property of the Tobago House of Assembly (THA) in late 2005 at a cost of $106 million TT dollars.

Dr. Sabga had spent a considerable amount of time and personal energy in developing the property into the Heritage Park and the systems and practices that he had established are still being practiced today by the THA who now maintain the property.

The controversy that surrounded PPHP was the establishment of an entry fee for usage of the facility.

This remains even after the considerable expense to purchase the property and return it to Government control.

The entry fee to PPHP is set at TT$20 (US$3.33/£2) per person (children aged 6–12 half-price and children under six free).

== See also ==
Nylon Pool
