= Teledisko =

teledisko
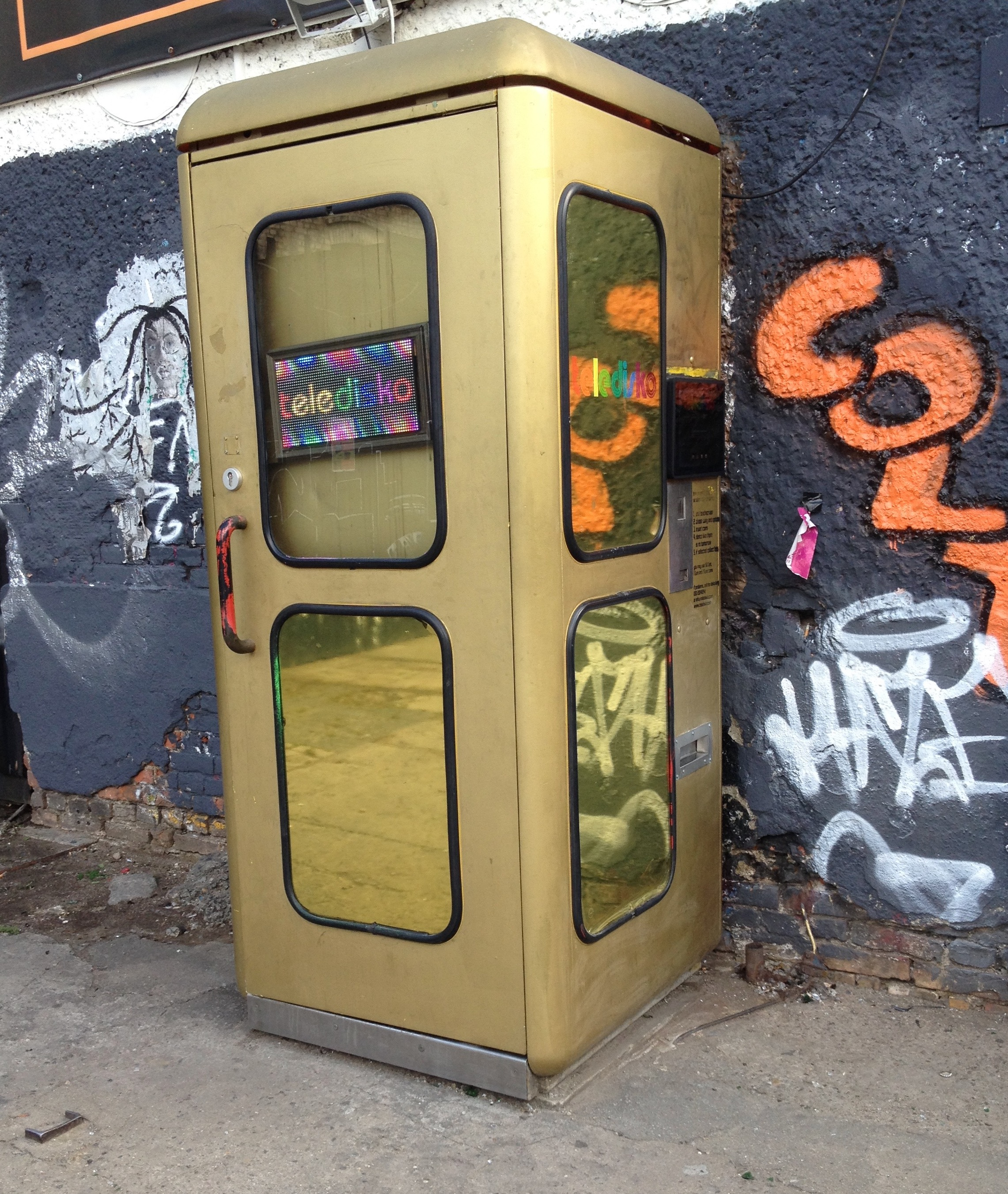
- Teledisko booth in Berlin
- Founded: 2014
- Founders: Nele Kolbe; Benjamin Uphues
- Headquarters: Berlin, Germany
- Area served: Germany, Spain
- Products: Automated mini disco booths
- Owner: teledisko DAO
- Website: teledisko.com

teledisko is an automated mini disco operated by teledisko DAO based in Berlin. It is considered the smallest disco in the world, measuring just one square metre.

== History ==
teledisko was founded in 2014 by Nele Kolbe and Benjamin Uphues. In 2022, teledisko was opened in Madrid.

== Machine ==
teledisko is built into an upcycled German phone booth and can accommodate up to five people at once. It is operated through a touch screen on the outside which lets users select the song. The song selection determines the duration of the session.

Despite its compact size, the disco has features such as strobe lights, a fog-machine and is controlled by buttons inside, It has the ability to take photos and a video. Patrons can opt to have their photos printed on-site or request a video to be sent to their email. Additionally, teledisko is portable and can be relocated to different locations for events.

== Locations ==
teledisko has five locations in Berlin, with the original, teledisko Pink, situated inside Kater Blau at Holzmarktstrasse 25. Other locations include one at the Club Sisyphos, teledisko white is located adjacent to the Mercedes-Benz Arena, further locations are at the RAW area on Revaler Strasse, and the Holzmarkt.
