= Nylon Pool =

Coral pool near Tobago

Coordinates: 11.17986°N 60.83381°W

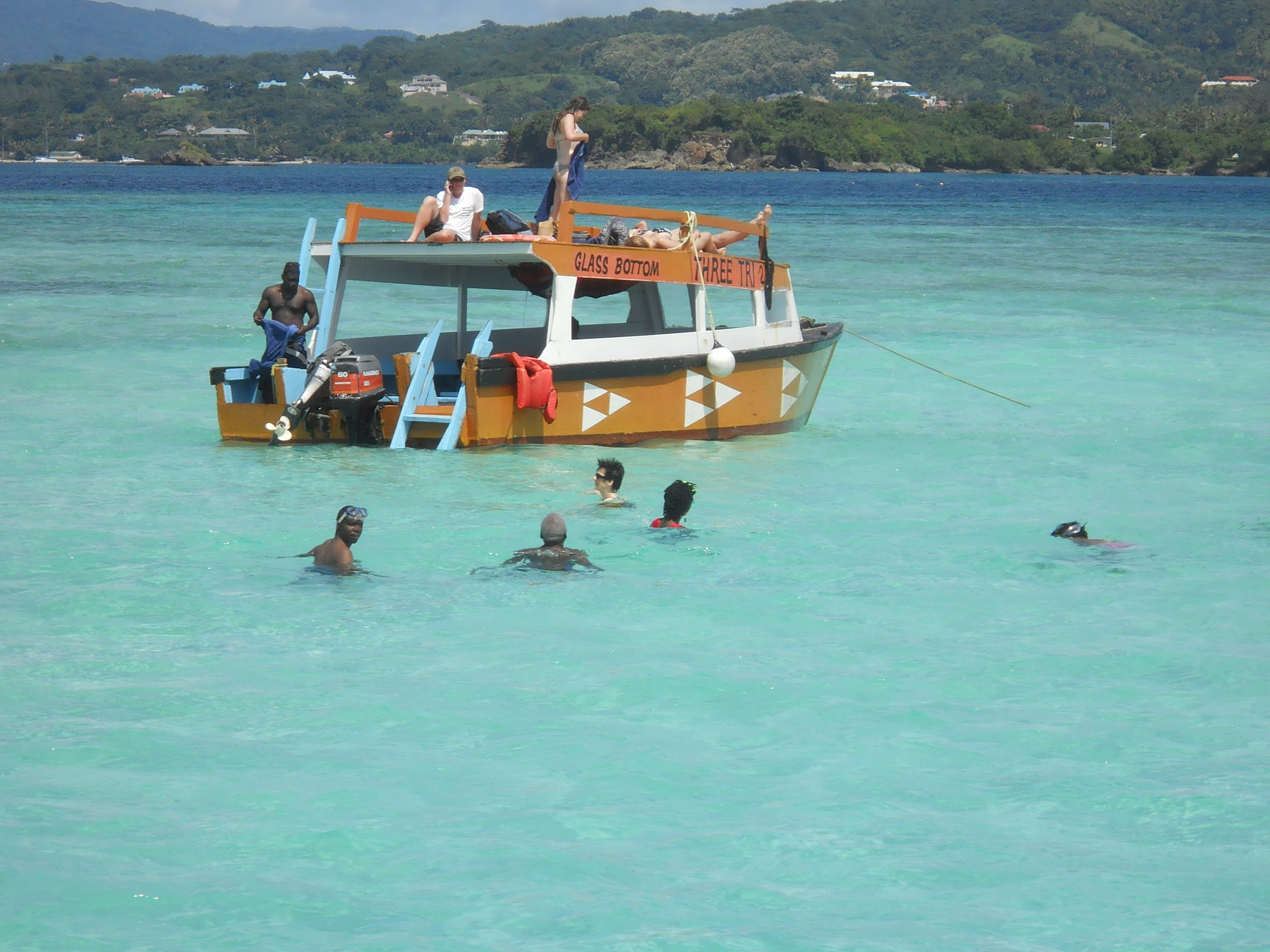
Boat and swimmers at nylon pool

Nylon Pool is an in-sea shallow white sand coral pool that is located off Pigeon Point, Tobago, and is accessible by boat. It is close to the Buccoo Reef, a protected area full of coral reefs. It was named by Princess Margaret in 1962, due to its extreme clarity which reminded her of nylon stockings. It is also one of Trinidad and Tobago's most visited attractions.
