= Tupé Sustainable Development Reserve =

- Reserva de Desenvolvimento Sustentável do Tupé
- IUCN category VI (protected area with sustainable use of natural resources)
- Location within Brazil
- Nearest city: Manaus, Amazonas
- Coordinates: 3.045614°S 60.252933°W
- Area: 11,930 hectares (29,500 acres)
- Designation: Sustainable development reserve
- Created: 2005
- Administrator: Secretaria Municipal de Meio Ambiente e Sustentabilidade

The Tupé Sustainable Development Reserve (Portuguese: Reserva de Desenvolvimento Sustentável do Tupé) is a sustainable development reserve (RDS) in the state of Amazonas, Brazil.

== Location ==
The Tupé Sustainable Development Reserve (RDS) is west of the city of Manaus, on the north bank of the Rio Negro about 25 kilometres (16 mi) from the urban area. It includes the communities of Livramento, Julião, Central, Tatu, São João do Lago do Tupé and Agrovida. It has an area of 11,930 hectares (29,500 acres).

Vegetation includes igapó and terra firma forest dominated by large trees. Tupé beach is a sand bar at the mouth of the Tupé stream where it enters the Rio Negro. The beach, which can only be accessed by boat, varies in width from 20 to 80 metres (66 to 262 ft) depending on the river's water level. It provides an excellent place for swimming, diving and boating, and receives many visitors on weekends and holidays.

As of 2016 the population was about 5,000. Residents say SEMMAS, the municipal environmental authority, prohibits planting crops or harvesting wood for construction. However, SEMMAS states that family-based agriculture and fishing are allowed. Efforts to develop ecotourism have not been encouraged. There are vacation homes in the reserve, mostly owned by wealthy entrepreneurs from Manaus, a source of friction with the residents.

== History ==
The location was once home to indigenous people such as the Manaós, now extinct, and the Tarumã. The present residents began to occupy the region in the 1970s. In 1990 municipality declared Tupé Beach an area of relevant ecological interest. In 1995 municipal law 321 created the Tupé Environmental Unit.

The Tupé Sustainable Development Reserve was created in 2005 by municipal decree 8.044 to preserve the site and develop the communities through ecotourism and sustainable agriculture. It is administered by SEMMAS (Secretaria Municipal de Meio Ambiente e Sustentabilidade), a department of the municipality of Manaus. The purpose was to mitigate the environmental impacts of real estate speculation and illegal exploitation of the natural resources, and support sustainable development of the traditional residents, with emphasis on combating poverty.

A draft management plan was completed in 2008, but was not approved under the administrations of successive mayors. The reserve became part of the Lower Rio Negro Mosaic, created in 2010. As of 2016 the management plan, which would define zoning and rules of use and management of natural resources, had still not been issued. This meant that the residents could not legally hunt, fish or grow crops for sale, but largely rely on government payments and occupations such as making handicrafts for sale to tourists.

== Sources ==
- Fabio Pontes (23 September 2016), "População tradicional da RDS do Tupé vive conflito ambiental no Amazonas", Amazônia Real (in Portuguese)
- "Reserva de Desenvolvimento Sustentável do Tupé", Portal Amazônia (in Portuguese)
- Unidades de Conservação - Mosaico do Baixo Rio Negro (in Portuguese), ICMBio: Chico Mendes Institute for Biodiversity Conservation
